= Slowly But Surely =

Slowly But Surely may refer to:

- "Slowly But Surely", a 1963 song by Elvis Presley included on Fun in Acapulco
- "Slowly But Surely", a 1973 song by Flower Travellin' Band included on Make Up
- "Slowly But Surely", a 1989 song by Marie Osmond included on Steppin' Stone
- Slowly but Surely, a 2003 album by Holly Golightly
