= Serial Girlfriend =

Studio album by Holly Golightly
- Released: 10 November 1998
- Genre: Indie rock, garage rock
- Length: 38:43
- Label: Damaged Goods
- Producer: Holly Golightly

Holly Golightly chronology
Up the Empire (1998)	Serial Girlfriend (1998)	In Blood (1999)

Professional ratings
Review scores
Source	Rating
Allmusic	4/5 stars

Serial Girlfriend is the sixth solo album by former Headcoatee Holly Golightly. It features a prominent garage rock sound and is composed of twelve original songs and one cover song.

== Track listing ==
All tracks written by Holly Golightly unless otherwise noted.

1. "I Can't Be Trusted" – 2:43
2. "You Shine" – 2:22
3. "Want No Other" (M. Delanian, Holly Golightly) – 2:56
4. "Your Love Is Mine" (Ike Turner) – 4:40
5. "Grandstand" – 2:03
6. "Clean in Two" – 3:08
7. "Down, Down, Down" – 2:28
8. "Come the Day" – 2:43
9. "Serial Girlfriend" – 2:12
10. "My Own Sake" – 2:15
11. "Where Can I Go" – 2:23
12. "'Til I Get" – 3:57
13. "Now" – 4:48

== Personnel ==
- Holly Golightly – double bass, guitar, piano, vocals
- Dan Melchior – guitar, harmonica, vocals
- Bruce Brand – drums, guitar, percussion, piano
- Ed Deegan – guitar
- Rick Appleby – electric bass
- Woodie Taylor – drums, percussion
- Matt Radford – double bass
- Brian Nevill – drums, piano
- George Sueref – guitar
- Michael Delanian – piano
- John Gibbs – electric bass
