= Witch girl =

The term witch girl or witch girls may refer to:

- The Witch Girl, a 1914 film starring Mary Fuller
- Witch-Girl, He Yueer (aka Yao nu He Yueer), a Mandarin language film featuring Peter Yang
- Majokko (魔女っ子, little witch), a subgenre of Japanese fantasy light novels, manga, anime, and video games
- Witch Girl, nickname of Lilka Eleniak, character from the video game Wild Arms 2
- "Witch Girl", song by Fire Dept, B-side to the 1988 "Girl, Girl, Girl, Girl" single
- Lifeforms, a 1994 album by the Future Sound of London

== See also ==
- Witch (disambiguation)
