= Everything You Touch =

Everything You Touch may refer to:

- "Everything You Touch", a song by Stephanie Mills from the album Personal Inspirations, 1994
- "Everything You Touch", a song by Smokey Robinson from the album Love, Smokey, 1990
- "Everything You Touch", a song by Holly Golightly and the Brokeoffs from the album You Can't Buy a Gun When You're Crying, 2007
