= Dirt Don't Hurt =

Studio album by Holly Golightly & The Brokeoffs
- Released: 14 October 2008
- Studio: Circo Perrotti Estudios, Gijón, Spain
- Genre: Folk rock, blues rock, country rock, americana, roots rock, rockabilly
- Length: 42:47
- Label: Transdreamer (US) Damaged Goods (UK/Europe)

Holly Golightly & The Brokeoffs chronology
You Can't Buy a Gun When You're Crying (2007)	Dirt Don't Hurt (2008)

Dirt Don't Hurt is the second official album by Holly Golightly and the Brokeoffs, former members of the band Thee Headcoatees. It is a collaboration with her long-time bandmate "Lawyer" Dave Drake.

== Track listing ==
1. "Bottom Below" (Holly Golightly and the Brokeoffs) – 3:24
2. "Up Off The Floor" (Holly Golightly and the Brokeoffs) – 3:42
3. "Burn Your Fun" (Holly Golightly and the Brokeoffs) – 3:36
4. "Slow Road" (Holly Golightly and the Brokeoffs) – 3:16
5. "My 45" (Holly Golightly and the Brokeoffs) – 2:22
6. "Cluck Old Hen" (Traditional, arranged by Holly Golightly and the Brokeoffs) – 2:20
7. "Indeed You Do" (Holly Golightly and the Brokeoffs) – 2:53
8. "Gettin' High For Jesus" (Holly Golightly and the Brokeoffs) – 2:31
9. "Three Times Under" (Holly Golightly and the Brokeoffs) – 3:06
10. "Accuse Me" (Holly Golightly and the Brokeoffs) – 2:34
11. "Boat's Up The River" (Traditional, arranged by Holly Golightly and the Brokeoffs) – 3:48
12. "For All This" (Holly Golightly and the Brokeoffs) – 3:48
13. "Cora" (Holly Golightly and the Brokeoffs) – 2:38
14. "I Wanna Hug Ya, Kiss Ya, Squeeze Ya" (Claudia Swann - Buddy Griffin) – 2:47

== Personnel ==
- Holly Golightly - guitar, banjo, vocals
- "Lawyer" Dave Drake - guitar, vocals, percussion, things with strings

Technical

- Jorge Muñoz-Cobo, Mike Mariconda - recording
- Bruce Brand - cover design

== Reception ==
Professional ratings
Review scores
Source	Rating
ChartAttack	4/5 stars
Allmusic	3.5/5 stars
Spin	3.5/5 stars
Pitchfork Media	(7.0/10)

=== Critical ===
Mojo magazine said the album is "not much different (from their first album), and that's no bad thing with Holly Golightly and Lawyer Dave's self-produced duets recalling Leadbelly and Jimmy Reed, as well as the gospel recordings of Loretta Lynn and Nancy & Lee." However, Uncut magazine said it "sounds alarmingly authentic." Pitchfork magazine found the album "a heartily ramshackle affair, with pots and pans for percussion, rudimentary banjo picking, and what sound like first take on every track. The album's clattery rawness is its chief appeal." Allmusic said "Dirt Don't Hurt isn't necessarily magical, but it is fun and breezy, as well as a nice addition to Golightly's impressive catalog."
