= My 45 =

My 45 may refer to:

== Television stations ==
- KUTP, Phoenix, Arizona (O&O)
- KSHV-TV, Shreveport, Louisiana
- WBFF-DT2, a subchannel of WBFF, Baltimore, Maryland

== Music ==
- "My 45", a song from the album Dirt Don't Hurt by Holly Golightly and the Brokeoffs
