= The Dentists =

British indie rock band

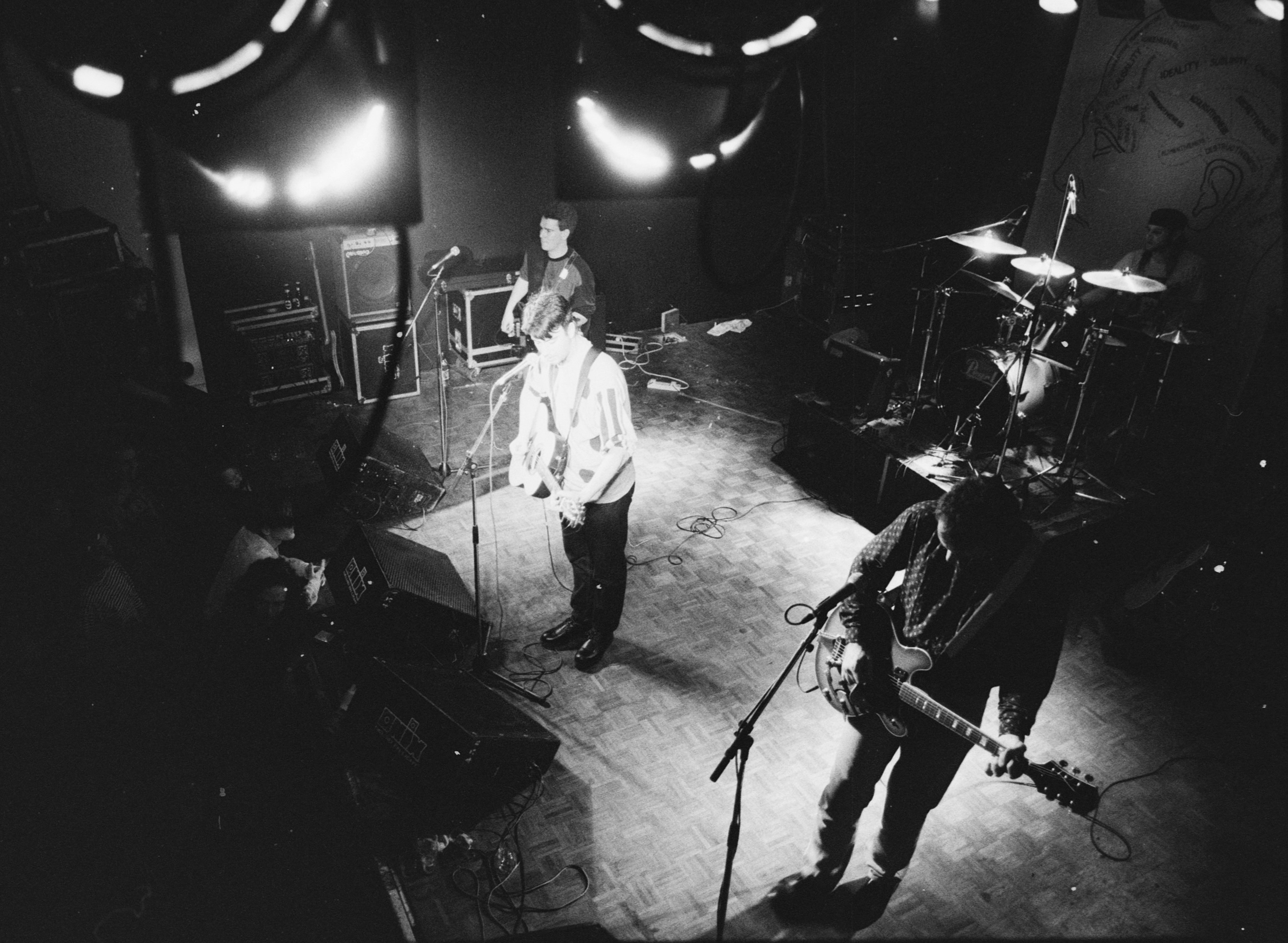
- The Dentists (Haarlem, 1991)

Background information
- Origin: Chatham, Kent, England
- Genres: Indie rock; Medway scene; jangle pop; power pop; neo-psychedelia
- Years active: 1984–1995, 2010
- Labels: Spruck, Eastwest, Homestead Records, Integrity Records
- Past members: Mick Murphy; Bob Collins; Mark Matthews; Ian Smith; Alun Jones; Rob Grigg
- Website: http://www.thedentistsweb.com/

This band is unrelated to the short-lived Nazi punk band of the same name. See Nazi punk for information on the latter.

The Dentists were an English indie rock band from the Medway towns (as part of the Medway scene) in England, who were active from 1984 to 1995. The band's permanent members were Mick Murphy (lead vocals), Bob Collins (guitar) and Mark Matthews (bass). The band also had three different drummers: Ian Smith (1984–1986), Alun Jones (1986–1991) and Rob Grigg (1991–1995). All members participated in writing songs. Mark ('Jock') Reid was Mick Murphy's predecessor as lead singer for the band in 1983 when they were known as The Ancient Gallery.

== History ==
The band met at school in the early 1980s and began playing gigs in their local area around Chatham and Rochester. Their first single, "Strawberries are Growing in My Garden (and It's Wintertime)", was quickly followed by the album Some People Are On The Pitch They Think It's All Over It Is Now (a reference to Kenneth Wolstenholme's commentary at the end of the 1966 World Cup). The record was produced by Allan Crockford of fellow Medway band The Prisoners and featured the track "I Had An Excellent Dream".

In December 1986, the band supported Del Amitri at the Marquee Club in London, and the Go-Betweens at the Astoria, London. In the same year, a reissue of "Strawberries ..." received radio play from John Peel and Andy Kershaw and was named 'runner-up Single of the Week' by Smash Hits magazine; it reached the Top 40 in the UK Indie Chart. The following year, the band recorded a radio session for Janice Long. Shortly afterwards, their Writhing On The Shagpile EP also made the indie charts.

In 1987, on their third visit to mainland Europe, the band were signed by the Belgian label Antler Records, who released a compilation album, Beer Bottle and Bannister Symphonies, and 12" single, "The Fun Has Arrived".

During the late 1980s the Dentists were the main attraction in the 'Medway Bands' Cooperative' (their closest rivals being The Claim). The cooperative was chiefly run by Andy Webber of The Hyacinth Girls, and would organise both small gigs and multi-act showcases (including the 'Blabber Club' at Churchill's in Chatham), featuring up-and-coming bands such as The Drunken Popes, The Strookas and Power in Motion. In June 1987, The Dentists headlined a show at the George Hotel in Chatham which featured all 23 acts.

After a relatively quiet period with no new releases for over two years, the band's second album, Heads and How to Read Them, was released on Antler in 1991. Third drummer, Rob Grigg replaced Alun Jones on the eve of the European Tour to promote the album.

Over the years, the band had attracted an underground following in the United States, and two American fans arranged for the band to play the 1991 College Music Journal festival. Shortly afterward, the Dentists were signed by the American label Homestead Records, which released the compilation Dressed (1992) and the album Powdered Lobster Fiasco (1993).

In 1992, the Dentists released three seven-inch singles - "See No Evil", "Hear No Evil", and "Speak No Evil" - simultaneously on three different record labels. Each single consisted of two songs by the band and an eponymous poem by John Hegley, read by the poet.

Powdered Lobster Fiasco finally attracted the attention of a major label, and the band signed to Eastwest Records in 1993. Their first album for Eastwest, Behind the Door I Keep the Universe, reached Number 8 on the CMJ College Radio charts and was followed by a six-week tour of the U.S. supporting Shonen Knife. A second album, Deep Six, was recorded in early 1995 and produced by Wharton Tiers, but it failed to sell, and the band parted company with Eastwest. A demo of new songs was recorded in France, produced by Mike Hedges but Collins left the band shortly afterwards, their final appearance coming at the 1995 CMJ Music Marathon in New York City. The other members went on to form a new band, Coax with Chris Flack on guitar.

Lida Husik covered "Strawberries Are Growing in My Garden (and It's Wintertime)" on her 1995 album Joyride.

Some People Are on the Pitch They Think It's All Over It Is Now was re-released on CD in 2005 by Rev-Ola Records, a subsidiary of Cherry Red.

In 2010, a new Dentists compilation of previously unreleased demos and rarities If All The Flies Were One Fly, was released and the band played two reunion gigs, one with fellow Medway band The Claim on Thursday 25 March 2010 at Dingwalls in Camden Town, London, and the following night, supported by The Love Family, at the Beacon Court, Gillingham.

One of the band's songs, We Thought We'd Got To Heaven, was for a time the subject of a lostwave mystery.

Some People Are on the Pitch They Think It's All Over It Is Now was reissued on vinyl LP in the United Kingdom and United States by Trouble in Mind Records in 2013.

Former drummer Alun Jones died in September 2013.

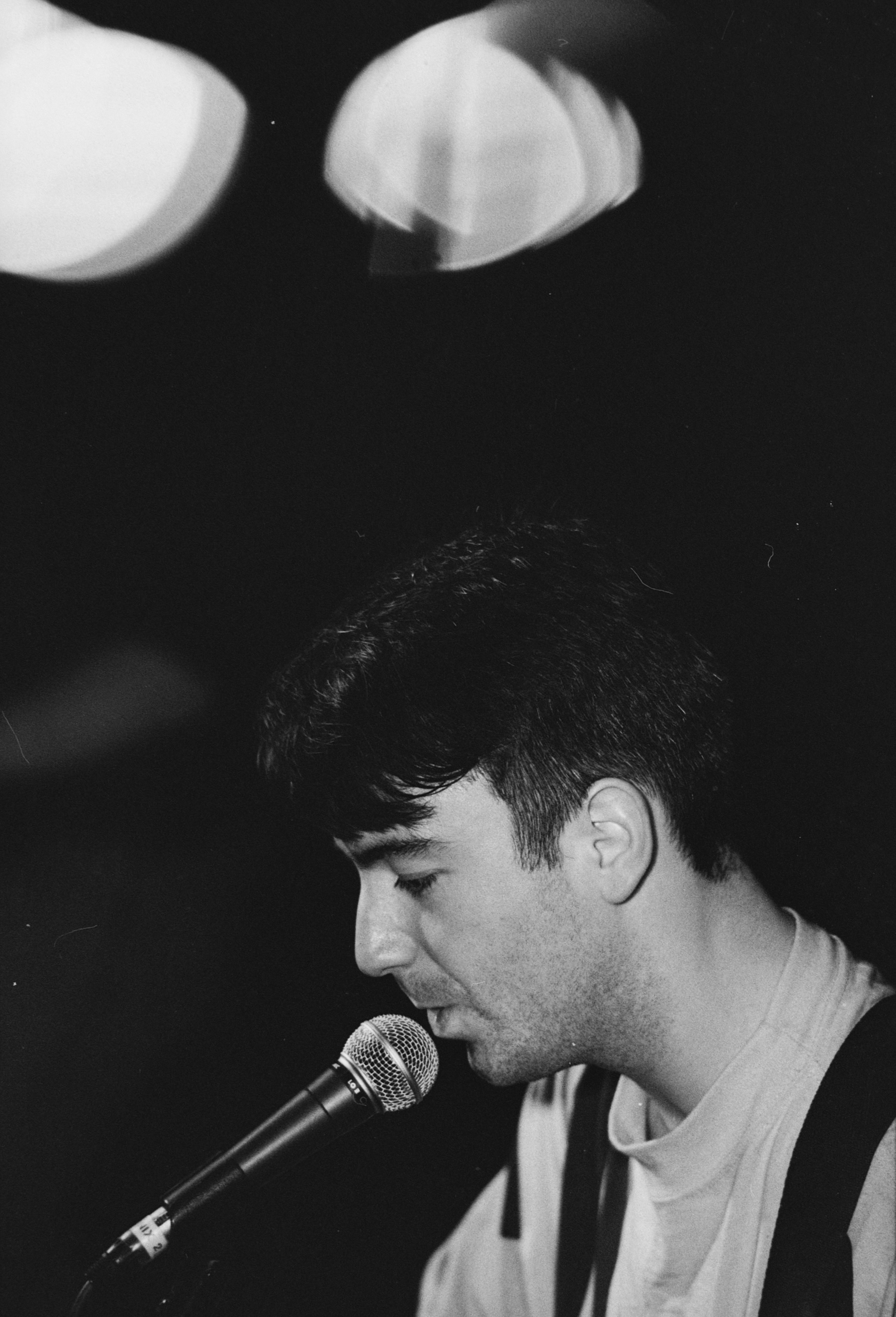
The Dentists (1991)

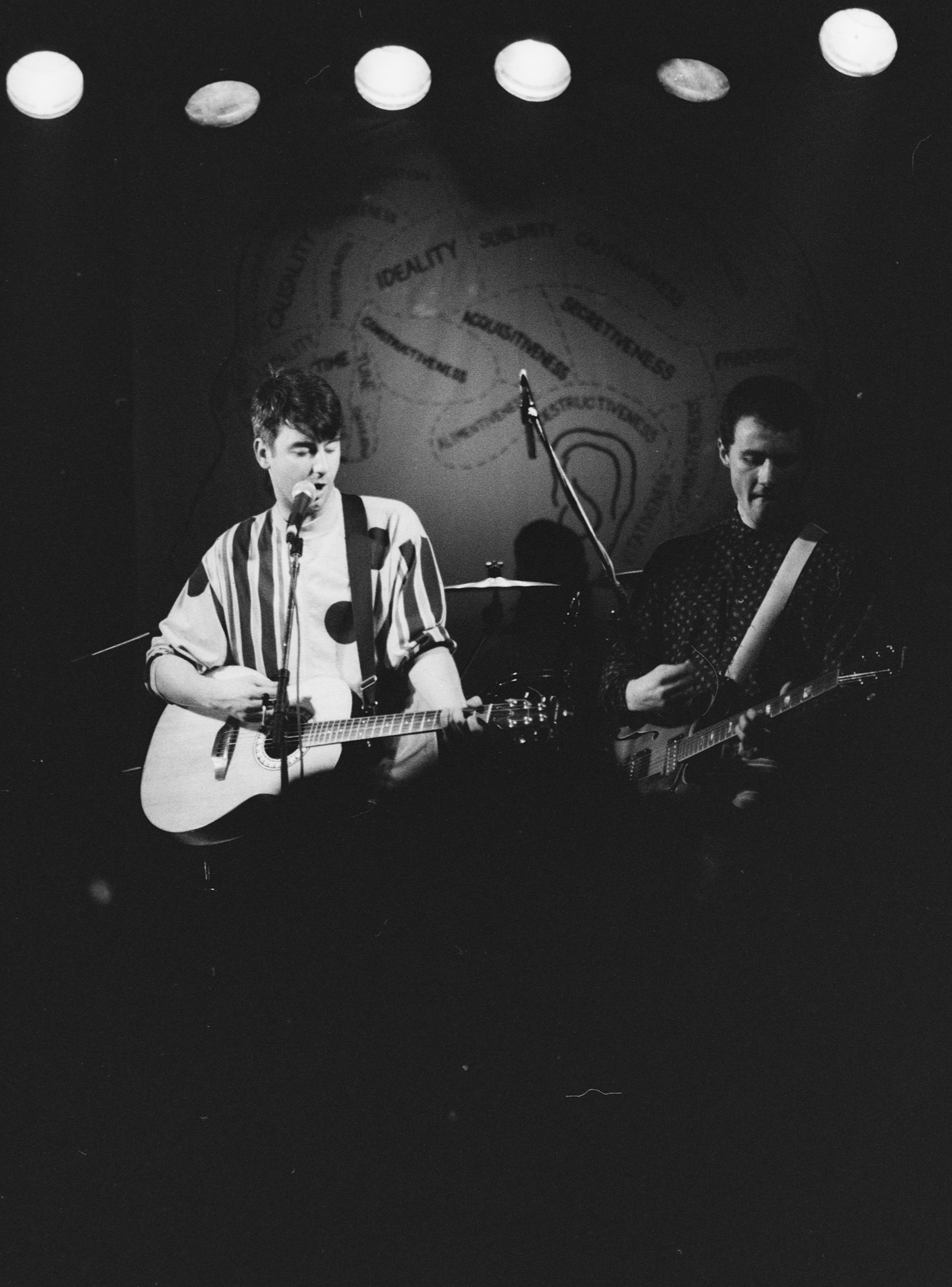
The Dentists (1991)

== Discography ==
=== Albums ===
- Some People Are on the Pitch They Think It's All Over It Is Now (Spruck Records, 1985; re-released on CD by Rev-Ola Records, 2005; reissued on vinyl by Trouble in Mind Records, 2013)
- Heads and How to Read Them (Integrity Records, 1991)
- Behind the Door I Keep the Universe (Eastwest Records, 1994)
- Deep Six (Eastwest Records, 1995)

=== Singles and EPs ===
- "Strawberries Are Growing in My Garden (And It's Wintertime)" (single, Spruck Records, 1985)
- You and Your Bloody Oranges (EP) (Spruck Records, 1985)
- Down and Out in Paris and Chatham (EP) (Tambourine Records, 1986)
- Writhing on the Shagpile (EP) (Tambourine Records, 1987)
- The Fun Has Arrived (EP) (Antler Records, 1988)
- "Beautiful Day" (single) (Antler Records, 1991)
- "House the Size of Mars" (single) (Antler Records, 1991)
- "See No Evil" (single) (Homestead Records, 1992)
- "Hear No Evil" (single) (Independent Project, 1992)
- "Speak No Evil" (single) (Bus Stop Label, 1992)
- "Bigbangredshiftblackholes" (boxed set of three seven-inch singles) (Eastwest Records, 1993)
- Janice Long Session 02.04.87 (Precious, 2023)

=== Compilations ===
- Beer Bottle and Bannister Symphonies: A Collection of Some of the Finer Moments of Dentistry (Antler Records, 1988)
- Naked (Independent Project Records, 1991
- Dressed (Homestead Records, 1992)
- Powdered Lobster Fiasco (Homestead Records, 1993)
- If All the Flies Were One Fly (Bedroom 14, 2010)
