= Ella Guru =

American painter and musician (born 1966)

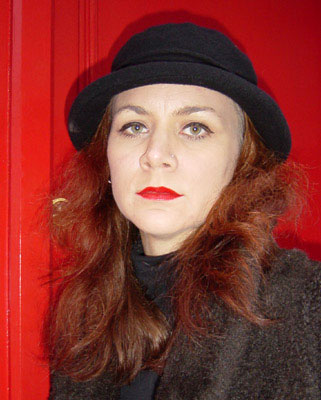
- Photo of Ella Guru by Charles Thomson
- Born: Ella Drauglis; May 24, 1966 (age 60); Ohio, U.S.
- Education: Ohio State University
- Known for: Painting
- Movement: Stuckism

Ella Guru
- Genres: Punk rock • riot grrrl • britpop • garage punk • indie rock
- Occupation: Singer-Songwriter
- Instruments: Guitar, vocals

Ella Guru (born Ella Drauglis; May 24, 1966) is an American painter and musician living in Hastings, East Sussex, England. She was a member of Mambo Taxi and the Voodoo Queens. In 1999, she became one of the founding members of the Stuckist art movement.

== Early life and education ==
Guru (birth name Ella Drauglis) was born in the U.S. state of Ohio. She did a commercial art course at Fort Hayes Career Center (1982–84) and attended Columbus College of Art and Design (1984–86), which she left because of "all the conceptual crap". She graduated in fine arts from Ohio State University (1988–89), where she received the Visual Arts Award.

== Career ==
From 1990 to 1991, Guru travelled to Africa and India, then for the next year lived an Islamic lifestyle in an Algerian household in Islington, London, where she was a waitress in a Mexican restaurant. She has lived in London since this time.

In 1996, she rode a bicycle to Lithuania, and met Sexton Ming in London, after borrowing his lipstick.

In 1997, she worked as a web site designer.

In 2001, she married Ming on a Dorset cliff top; they wore drag. Her daughter Lucy was born in 2004.

She had lunch in New York with Quentin Crisp, who said she was "weird". Guru's pseudonym is taken from a Captain Beefheart song on the album Trout Mask Replica.

=== Music ===
In the early 1990s, Guru was a guitarist in the London-based British band, Mambo Taxi, linked with Riot Grrrl. The inspiration for the band came from UK garage rock and US punk, and their sound was a mixture of garage, punk, and pop. The name was a reference to the Mambo Taxi used by the heroine of the film, Women on the Verge of a Nervous Breakdown. Guru in an interview with NME's Sam Stallard in 1992, said the name was "tacky", and "with all sorts of different things in it that sort of clash, but everything’s useful as well as fun."

In late 1992, drummer Anjali Bhatia left Mambo Taxi to start the Voodoo Queens, along with Guru and others. After their first concert, they were offered a Peel session by BBC DJ, John Peel. This was recorded in January 1993. Other radio and TV appearances followed, including a further two Peel Sessions, and a busking competition against Boyzone on Channel 4's music and arts programme Naked City. The group reached number one in the Indie chart in 1993. Guru was replaced on bass guitar in 1994.

She has played in The Deptford Beach Babes, and also with her partner, Sexton Ming, in his band, The Tasty Ones.

=== Stuckism ===
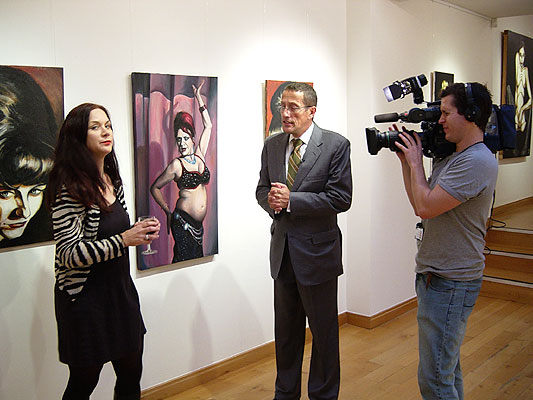
Ella Guru is interviewed by Richard Quest of CNN International during Go West at Spectrum London gallery, October 2006

Guru started painting seriously again in 1997. In 1999, she was one of the thirteen founder members of the pro-figurative painting Stuckists, an anti-conceptual art and pro-figurative painting art movement founded by Charles Thomson and Billy Childish. She started the Stuckist web site, stuckism.com:

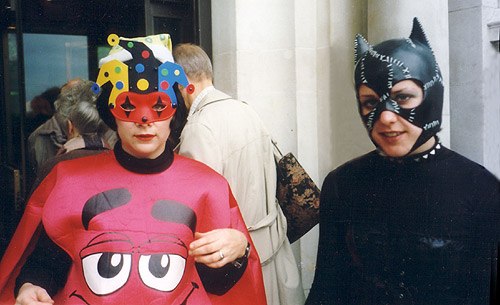
Ella Guru (left) demonstrates against the Turner Prize, 2000.

Thomson said that most of the Stuckist groups made their first contact through the site and that Stuckism was "the first significant art movement to spread via the Internet." In 2000, she took part in the first Stuckist demonstration against the Turner Prize at Tate Britain, and has done so in later years also.

In 2004, she was one of the fourteen artists in the "founder and featured" section of The Stuckists Punk Victorian show held at the Walker Art Gallery for the Liverpool Biennial. In 2006, she was one of the ten "leading Stuckists" in the Go West exhibition at Spectrum London gallery.

==== Painting ====
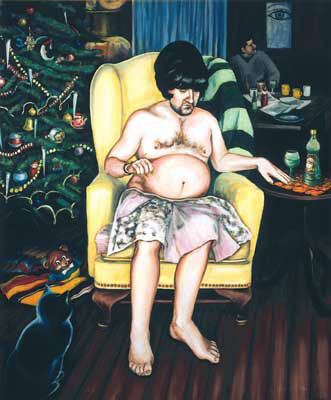
Ella Guru. The Queen's Speech.

Guru has stated her concern for ability and technique, and her admiration for the work of Old Masters, although they are not necessarily her model for painting: she also appreciates untrained artists who show invention in their work. She spent three years painting life models at art college, which gave her much of the grounding for her approach to art.

Her paintings take anywhere between two days and two years to complete, and usually start by her "going out and getting pissed with my friends", when she takes the photographs which provide the initial ideas, although the images she works from are often "very bad, dark, fuzzy photos", necessitating subsequent real life studies as well as imaginative interpretation. The initial layout is done with a line drawing, but the aim is to achieve a finished result where the subject appears three-dimensional. She has talked about an irrational obsession with shapes, such as those of wigs, which have always fascinated her.

Her painting The Queen's Speech had its origin in Pennsylvania in the house of a friend, with whom Guru has collaborated for a number of years in setting up suitable scenes for photographs by dressing people in costume. This particular scene, showing Guru's husband, Sexton Ming, was the friend's idea. A photograph was the starting point for the painting, which was not started until Guru's return to London, but it was augmented by life studies and also the addition of extra items, such as the bottle of absinthe.

== Honors ==
- Painter of the Year 2000, Amsterdam Gay News
- Real Turner Prize 2002, joint winner.
- "Album cover of the Year" Pure Rawk Awards 2015, for the Urban Voodoo Machine album cover "Love, Drink and Death."

== Gallery ==
Some paintings by Ella Guru.

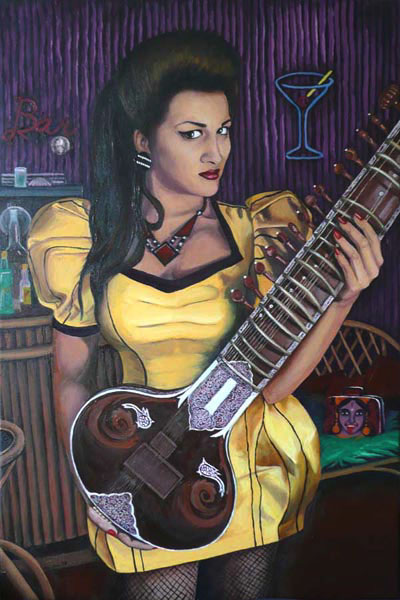
Bishi

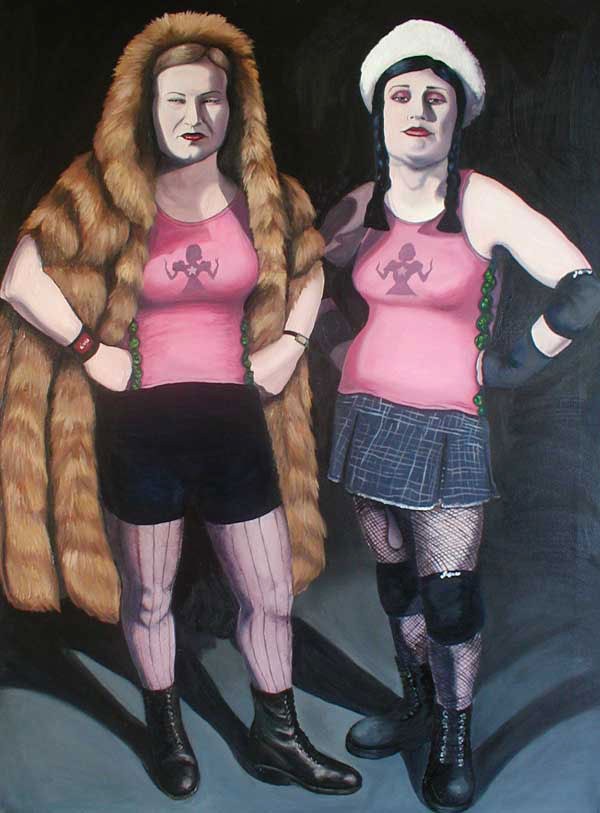
Female Wrestlers

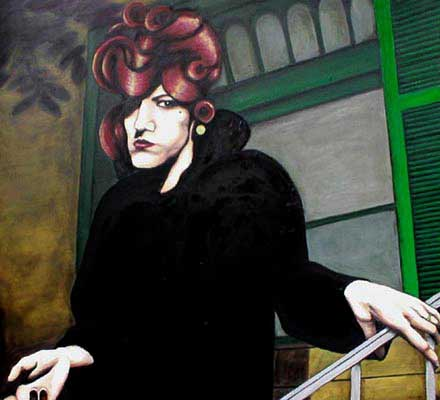
Goodbye Columbus

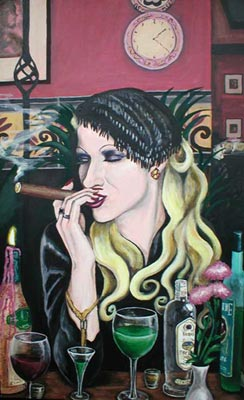
The Forcibly Bewitched

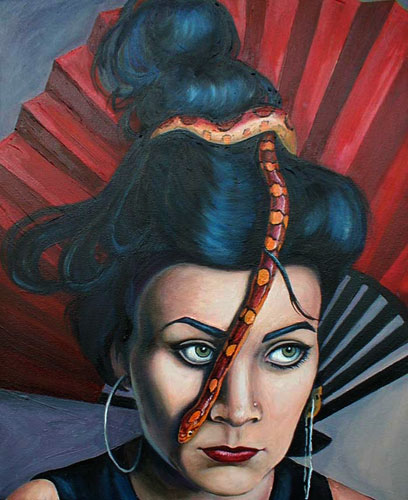
Fan and Snake

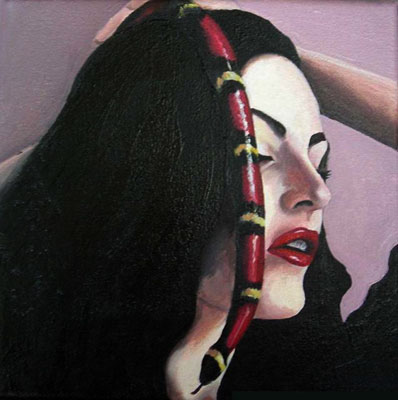
Snake 4

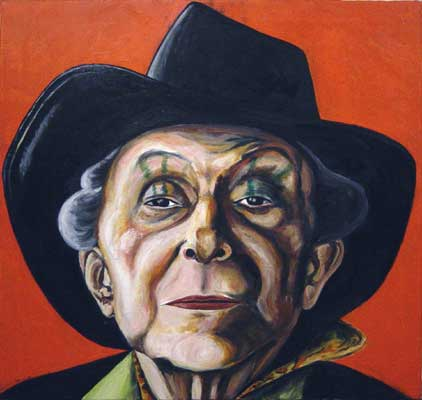
Quentin Crisp

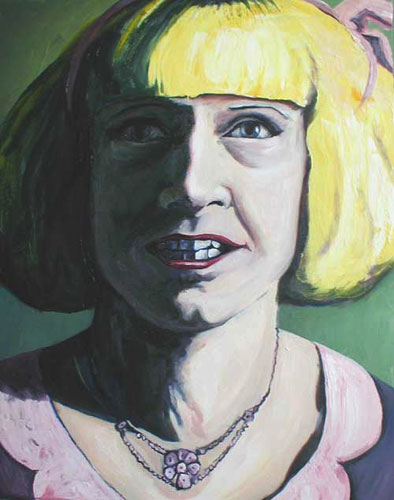
Grayson Perry

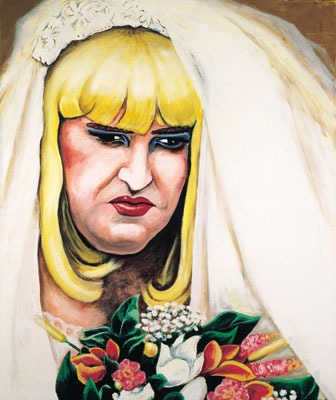
The Bride

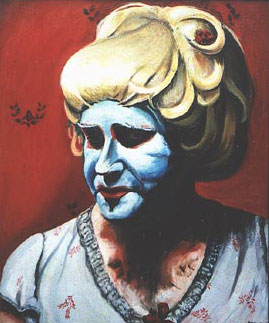
Sexton Ming with Face Pack
