= Truly She Is None Other =

Studio album by Holly Golightly
- Released: 4 August 2003
- Genre: Indie rock
- Length: 41:13
- Label: Damaged Goods
- Producers: Holly Golightly & Liam Watson

Holly Golightly chronology
Singles Round-Up (2003)	Truly She Is None Other (2003)	Slowly but Surely (2004)

Professional ratings
Review scores
Source	Rating
Allmusic	link
Rolling Stone	link

Truly She Is None Other is the eleventh solo album by Holly Golightly, former member of the band Thee Headcoatees, released on 4 August 2003 and is considered her most commercial album to date. It features nine original songs and four covers. The album's liner notes were written by Jack White.

== Track listing ==
1. "Walk a Mile" (Holly Golightly) – 2:44
2. "All Around the Houses" (Golightly) – 4:01
3. "Without You Here" (Golightly) – 2:57
4. "One Neck" (Golightly) – 2:55
5. "Time Will Tell" (Ray Davies) – 2:41
6. "Black Night" (Robinson) – 4:08
7. "It's All Me" (Golightly) – 2:18
8. "She Said" (Golightly) – 2:03
9. "Tell Me Now So I Know" (Davies) – 2:02
10. "You Have Yet to Win" (Golightly) – 3:25
11. "Sent" (Golightly) – 3:44
12. "This Ship" (Golightly) – 4:37
13. "There's an End" (C. Fox) – 3:33

== Personnel ==
- Holly Golightly primary artist, guitar, percussion, vocals
- Eric Stein bass guitar, guitar
- John Gibbs bass guitar, guitar, double bass
- Bruce Brand guitar, percussion, concertina, drums
- Ed "Everything Louder Than Everything Else" Deegan guitar, engineer
- Sir Bald Diddley guitar, double bass
