= The Claim (band) =

British rock band

- Origin: Cliffe, Kent, England
- Genres: Indie rock, indie pop
- Years active: 1985–1992, 2009, 2010
- Labels: Esurient Communications, Caff Records, Trick Bag, A Turntable Friend
- Members: David Read (vocals, guitar); David Arnold (guitar); Martin Bishop (drums); Stuart Ellis (bass)
- Past members: Adrian Hatcher; John Cleary

The Claim were a British band from Cliffe, Kent, England.

== Biography ==
They formed around 1980, as part of the independent Medway scene around the nearby towns of Rochester, Chatham and Gillingham and influenced by classic acts such as The Kinks, The Jam, The Clash and The Smiths. Stylistically, they shared much in common with fellow Kent band The Dentists and early Creation Records acts such as The Jasmine Minks.

Between 1985 and 1992, The Claim released two albums and various singles and EPs, first on their own record label, and then via Kevin Pearce's Esurient Communications imprint, Bob Stanley's Caff label and the German-based label A Turntable Friend. Their first outing, Armstrong’s Revenge & Eleven Other Short Stories (1985) was followed by the 12" EP This Pencil Was Obviously Sharpened By a Left-Handed Indian Knife Thrower (again on Trick Bag Records), all the tracks were recorded at Woolley Studios, Sheerness. By the time of 1988's Boomy Tella LP, the quality of their politically fused, bittersweet songs had matured considerably, and it is now regarded as their high-water mark. Meanwhile, their single "Wait And See" was recorded at ex-Jam drummer Rick Buckler's studio with ex-Jam producer Vic Coppersmith-Heaven.

The Claim also teamed up with the poet and ex-Dentists drummer Vic Templar (an alias for Ian Smith) for various evenings which combined a play, featuring members of The Claim, with a musical performance by the band. The drama, called "The Guest" was premiered in Covent Garden in June of 1988. As well as the author Smith/Templar, the cast included Dave Read and Dave Arnold of The Claim, fellow Medway musician Jane Wrangham (Millions of Brazillians), The Dentists' Bob Collins, and Andrea McNally of Andrew Webber's Next Experimental Theatre Group. The performance at The Medway Arts Centre on the 3rd August 1988 was accompanied by a poetry reading from Bill Lewis, Sexton Ming, and Billy Childish, of the Medway Poets. Templar also collaborated with The Claim for the song "Mike The Bike", issued as the B-side to perhaps The Claim's most impressive outing, "Birth Of A Teenager", issued as a limited edition single housed in a sleeve designed by the Medway scene's most multi-faceted talent, Billy Childish. For another gig, Welsh band The Manic Street Preachers played their debut London show supporting The Claim. The Claim played their final show in January 1993.

None of The Claim's music appeared on CD at the time. Recently, the band themselves compiled a retrospective, Black Path, which was released on Rev-Ola Records in September 2009. The band played a reunion gig in Rochester, Kent on 19 September 2009 to coincide with the project's release. On Thursday 25 March 2010, they played at a second reunion show with fellow Medway band The Dentists at Dingwalls in Camden Town, London. The track "Gullible's Travels" appeared on the expanded 3-CD deluxe reissue of the NME C86 box set, released on June 9th 2014.

== Discography ==
=== Singles ===
- "Wait And See" / "Business Boy" / "God, Cliffe And Me" (Esurient Comms PACE 04, January 1989)
- "Losers Corner" / "Picking Up The Bitter Little Pieces" (Esurient Comms PACE 07, January 1990)
- "Birth Of A Teenager" / "Mike The Bike" (limited edition, Caff CAFF 008, 1990)
- "Sunday" / "Sporting Life" (Esurient Comms PACE 10, 1991)
- "Say So" / "Plastic Grip" / "Waiting for Jesus" (A Turntable Friend TURN 08, 1992)

=== EPs ===
- This Pencil Was Obviously Sharpened By a Left-Handed Indian Knife Thrower (Trick Bag cu-0388, spring 1987)

=== Albums ===
- Armstrong’s Revenge & Eleven Other Short Stories (Trick Bag TBR001 [cu-0387], December 1985)
- Boomy Tella (Esurient Comms PACE 003, June 1988)
- The New Industrial Ballads (A Turntable Friend Records, May 2019)

=== Retrospective CD ===
- Black Path (Rev-Ola, September 2009)
