= The Claim =

The Claim may refer to:

- The Claim (band), a British band from Cliffe, Kent, England
- The Claim (1918 film), a 1918 American silent western film directed by Frank Reicher
- The Claim (2000 film), a 2000 British-Canadian Western romance film directed by Michael Winterbottom
