= The Aquarium L-13 =

Coordinates: 51.5205°N 0.1063°W

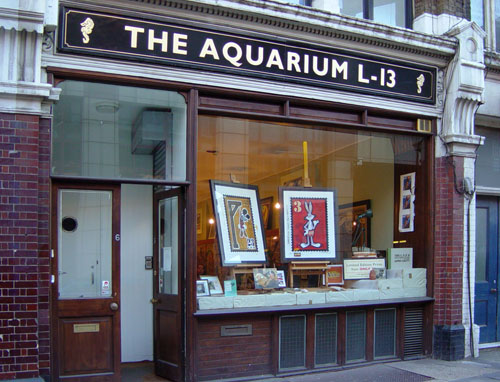
The Aquarium L-13 gallery in Farringdon Road, London

The Aquarium L-13 was a contemporary commercial art gallery run by Steve Lowe. It was originally based in a Georgian building in Bloomsbury, London, and then moved to Farringdon. It worked with artists, musicians and writers, and specialised in more unorthodox punk-based art work, including Jamie Reid, Jimmy Cauty, Billy Childish, Sexton Ming and artists associated with the indie label Stolen Recordings. It closed in December 2008, and re-opened as the L-13 Light Industrial Workshop in May 2009 in Clerkenwell.

== Name ==
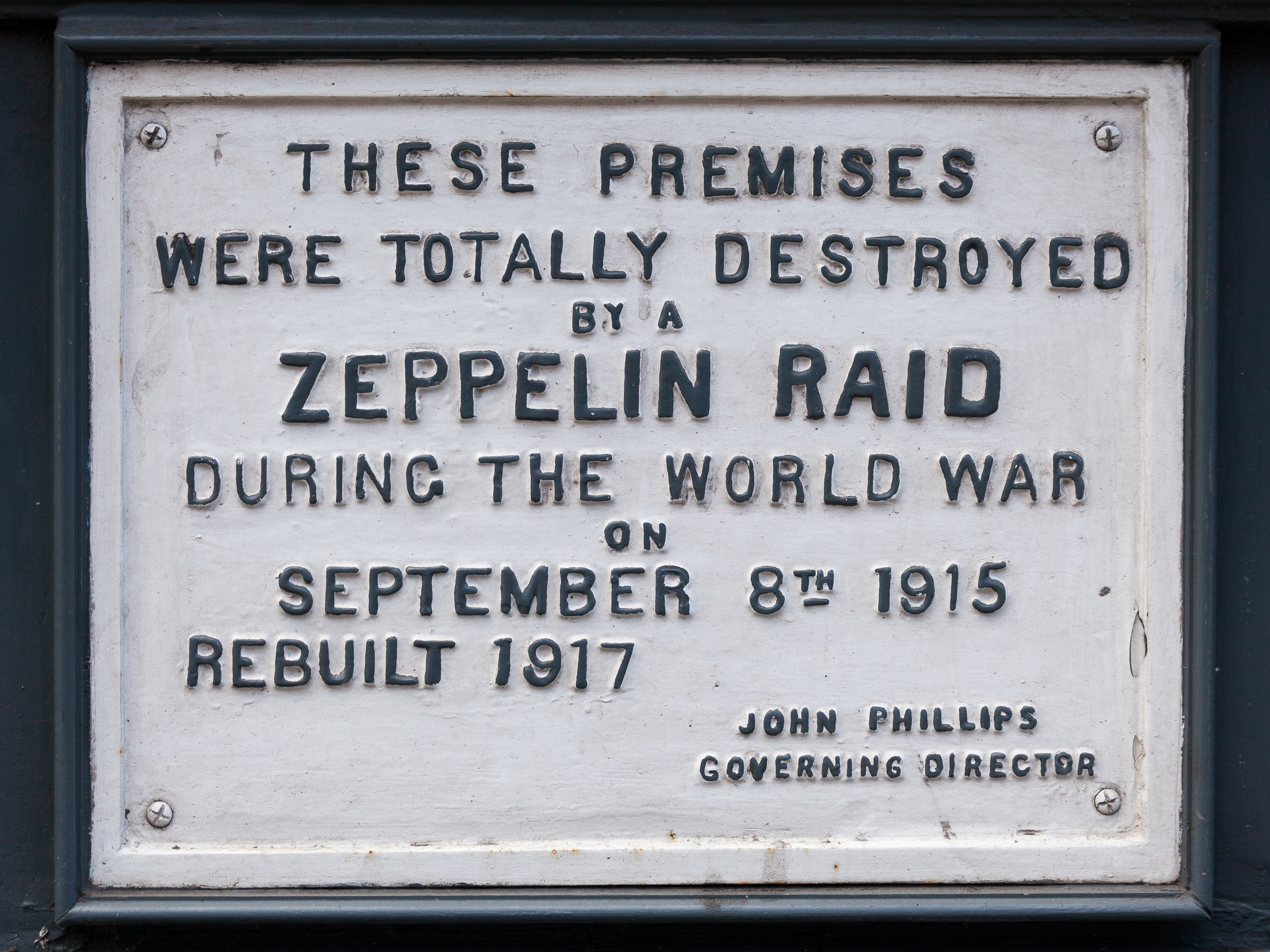

The "L-13" is the name of the zeppelin whose bomb destroyed the previous building at 63 Farringdon Road, during a zeppelin bombing raid during World War I, on 5 September 1915.

== Description ==
The gallery moved to Farringdon, but was originally in a quiet pedestrianised street near Euston Station, and called The Aquarium:

Your first job is to find it. No-one, even one hundred yards away, knows where the tiny street is. If you can find Upper Woburn Place, bang opposite Euston station, Woburn Walk is between two hotels, The Ambassadors in Bloomsbury and The County. Once inside, you may still be unsure you've found it. Unlike most venues, where space is everything, the tiny Aquarium is crammed with art. Stacks of novels and a cardboard box stuffed with rubber-stamp prints like afterthoughts, crowd a plinth. On the walls, woodcuttings jostle oils. Shelves carry poetry, mignon hand-painted hardbacks and seven-inch vinyl, little painted hessian squares and yet more rubber-stampings. It feels more like a grocer's shop than a gallery. I half-expected to be greeted by a stuttering Ronnie Barker. Instead, I was greeted by an enthusiastic young woman.

One of the first exhibitions at the Aquarium was of Concrete Poetry assembled by William English and including numerous pieces by Ian Hamilton Finlay loaned by Andrew Burgin who was one of the partners in the original Woburn Walk bookshop. Andrew was also instrumental in staging a Situationist exhibition at the gallery at which William English presented films by Maurice LeMaitre amongst others. Later exhibition: "Venus with Severed Leg", photographs of Vivienne Westwood taken in 1975 by William English in Sex; the shop on the King's Road owned by Vivienne and Malcolm McLaren. The Aquarium published a box of these pictures in an edition of 100 though only 40 were actually made.

As well as exhibiting work, the gallery was also involved in the production of it in collaboration with the artists. There was a steady output of novels, records, hand- made books, T-shirts, jewellery, limited edition prints, wallpaper, bed linen, internet sites, art multiples and even stamps.

It uses the promotional slogan "Purveyors of the finest and roughest in art and publishing". Part of a Billy Childish show was promoted on the gallery website:

Part 3: Insolence in the Face of Art - bad painting and refusing to "fulfill his fucking potential"

"Back in the 1990s when all the Brit Art rebels were sucking up to Saatchi and Thatcher, I decided to remain on the wrong end of the seasaw and paint like a monkey. Thus being brilliant whilst continuing to annoy the big boys" - Billy Childish
A selection of these great paintings will be exhibited and a limited edition catalogue will be produced as well as a series of prints.

In 2004 Jimmy Cauty installed a gift shop, Blackoff, based on the government's Preparing for Emergencies leaflet. The installation included "terror aware" items, such as "terror tea towels", "attack hankies" and "bunker-buster jigsaw puzzles" (missing one piece). Cautie commented, "The gift shop becomes the place we can explore our branding ideas, Cash for trash — it represents the futility and the glory of it all."

For the 2007 Islington Art Fair, the gallery produced a limited edition print of Jamie Reid's 1977 poster for God Save the Queen by the Sex Pistols. It was titled "Never Trust a Punk."

The gallery's artists include Jamie Reid, Billy Childish, Jimmy Cauty, Sexton Ming, and STOT21stCPlanB. There have also been exhibitions of work by Daniel Johnston, Frank Kozik and Anne Pigalle.

The Aquarium L-13 was at 63 Farringdon Road, London EC1.

== Dispute with the White Stripes ==
In March 2006 an argument took place in the press between Billy Childish and US musician Jack White of The White Stripes. Childish criticised White in the US GQ magazine, "They don't have a good sound ... Jack's half into the sound and music, but then he wants to be a pop star as well, so you've got a big problem." White responded on the Stripes' website, accusing Childish of plagiarism and of being "the bitter garage rocker." Childish then wrote an open letter to the NME saying White was jealous because he had "a bigger collection of hats, a better moustache ... and a fully developed sense of humour."

The Aquarium Gallery produced a spoof boxing poster advertising Jack "whingy" White v Billy "bitter" Childish, which was offered for sale on eBay. Lawyers acting for the White Stripes complained to eBay, claiming the poster violated their intellectual property rights, and eBay removed it from sale. According to news reports, lawyers have contacted the gallery. White's spokesperson said, ""This particular poster was a bootleg and that is why it was removed from sale." Lowe commented, ""It was just a bit of fun but these people don't seem to have a sense of humour. I did the poster to entertain Billy and our customers really, but then we go and get this letter. I've written to the White Stripes' management to see exactly what copyright we're infringing." Steve Lowe of the Aquarium also said "a lot of what was reported in the press is inaccurate. We're not an Eastend Gallery and we're not being sued. The White Stripes had the poster removed from eBay, that is all. Anyone can do that." Since then the Aquarium sold all the edition of 10 posters on eBay raising £1100 that is being split between both Billy Childish and Jack White. The money is being converted into gold and put in pots for the two pugilists to collect. There is also a cheap edition that can be bought from the gallery's web-site.
