= L-13 Light Industrial Workshop =

Art studio in London

Coordinates: 51.5205°N 0.1063°W

L-13 Light Industrial Workshop is a contemporary art studio and publisher that opened in May 2009 in Clerkenwell, London. Founded and operated by Steve Lowe, it is a revised incarnation of his previous galleries and small presses, ‘the aquarium’ and The Aquarium L-13, and works with a small group of artists known for their unorthodox stances, in developing, exhibiting and publishing their work.

== Name ==
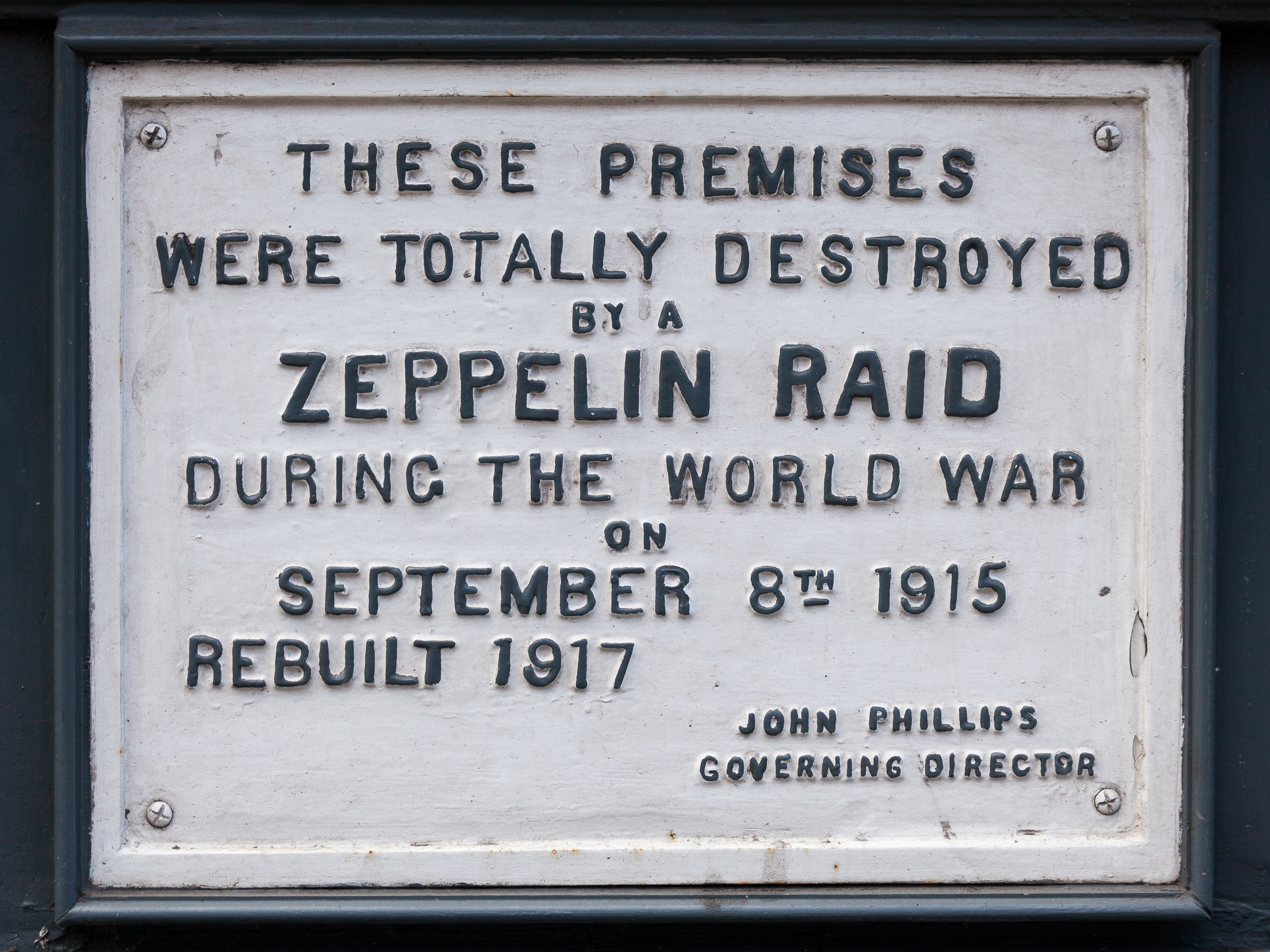

"L-13" is the name of the zeppelin that left a trail of bombs across Clerkenwell in 1915. One of which destroyed the building at L-13's previous site on Farringdon Road.

== Description ==
L-13 claims it "is a creative platform, spiritual home and technical epicentre for a small group of artists that Lowe has found himself working with - both in collaborative venture and by way of support for the individual artists ... We are also physical home to the Harry Adams / STOT21stCplanB / NOT Banksy studio, an 1825 Albion Press, The Patented Finger of God Painting Machine and a miniature poodle known as The Beast. We develop creative projects both ambitious and diminutive: publish books, make prints & other artwork editions; convert impractical artistic visions to reality; and promote a playful polemic spirit in all we do."

The L-13 HQ is an underground space off Clerkenwell Road where they used to stage exhibitions but is now used only as a studio space for the production of their artworks and publications, and the organisation of artist's projects.

When still operating as an exhibition space it was described as "Part swish contemporary gallery, part subversive socio-political vision, part artists' studio and part members' club" by the Urban Junkies website.

The L-13 artists are Jamie Reid, Billy Childish, Jimmy Cauty, Harry Adams and STOT21stCplanB.

== Projects ==
- Jimmy Cauty ADP World Riot Tour and MdZ ESTATE Tour + publications
- Merchants of Death Merchandise for K2 Plant Hire Ltd
- Billy Childish exhibitions and publications
- Jamie Reid publications
- Harry Adams studio, exhibitions and publications
- STOT21stCplanB studio, exhibitions and publications
- Not Banksy studio, publications and project management

== See also ==
- Billy Childish
- The Aquarium L-13
- Jimmy Cauty
- The KLF
- Jamie Reid
