= My First Holly Golightly Album =

Studio album by Holly Golightly
- Released: 2005
- Genre: Indie, rock, garage rock, rock and roll, country, blues rock

Holly Golightly chronology
Slowly but Surely (2004)	My First Holly Golightly Album (2005)	You Can't Buy a Gun When You're Crying (2007)

My First Holly Golightly Album is an album released by Holly Golightly in 2005.

== Track listing ==
1. "Wherever You Were"
2. "Directly From My Heart"
3. "You Ain't No Big Thing"
4. "Walk A Mile"
5. "Won't Go Out"
6. "Sally Go Round the Roses"
7. "Your Love Is Mine"
8. "Nothing You Can Say"
9. "Black Night"
10. "Mother Earth"
11. "An Eye For An Empty Heart"
12. "Further On Up The Road"
13. "Run Cold"
14. "Can't Stand To See Your Face"
15. "Slowly But Surely"
16. "My Love Is"
17. "I Can't Stand It"
