= Thee Mighty Caesars =

English garage rock/punk band

- Origin: Chatham, Kent, England
- Genres: Garage rock, punk rock, garage punk
- Years active: 1985-1989
- Labels: Hangman Records, Big Beat, Crypt, Damaged Goods
- Past members: Billy Childish; Graham Day; John Agnew; Bruce Brand

Thee Mighty Caesars were a Medway scene garage/punk group, formed by Billy Childish (vocals/guitar) in 1985 after the demise of The Milkshakes, alongside John Agnew (bass) and Graham Day (drums), who initially was still also in fellow Medway band The Prisoners.

Bruce Brand (ex-Pop Rivets/Milkshakes) was replaced after the first album by Day, who later formed his own band The Prime Movers with fellow Prisoner Allan Crockford and Wolf Howard (ex-Daggermen). Childish/Brand then formed new band Thee Headcoats.

== Discography ==
=== Albums ===
- Thee Mighty Caesars (1985)
- Beware the Ides of the March (Big Beat, 1985)
- Thee Caesars of Trash (1986)
- Acropolis Now (1986)
- Wiseblood (Ambassador, 1987)
- John Lennon’s Corpse Revisited (Crypt, 1989)

=== Compilations ===
- Live in Rome (Big Beat, 1987) [studio recordings with overdubbed 'live' effects]
- Don't Give Any Dinner to Henry Chinaski (1987) [demos]
- Punk Rock Showcase (Hangman, 1987)
- Thusly, thee Mighty Caesars (English Punk Rock Explosion) (Crypt, 1989) (U.S.)
- Surely They Were the Sons of God (Crypt, 1989) (U.S.)
- Caesars Remains (1992)
- Caesars Pleasure (1994)
