= The Strookas =

- Origin: Maidstone, England
- Genres: Alternative rock, punk rock, pop punk, power pop
- Years active: 1986–present
- Labels: Fixing a Hole Records, Engineer Records, Moving Change Records
- Members: David Bloomfield; Tony O'Rourke; John Edwards
- Past members: Cliff Bailey

The Strookas are an English alternative rock band hailing from Maidstone, Kent. The band's line up consists of David Bloomfield (guitar, backing vocals), Tony O'Rourke (bass guitar) and John Edwards (drums, lead vocals). They are part of the Medway scene, a collection of bands who come from in and around the Medway towns in Kent. To date, they have released two albums, two EPs and two compilations. They have toured with Green Day.

== Musical style ==
The Strookas play a mix of alternative rock and punk, combining distorted guitars, fast tempos, and catchy choruses. They have been likened to Hüsker Dü, Radio Birdman, Dinosaur Jr, Bob Mould and Descendents.

== Members ==
- David Bloomfield, guitars and backing vocals (1986–present)
- John Edwards, drums and lead vocals (1986–present)
- Tony O'Rourke, bass (1991–present)

=== Past members ===
- Cliff Bailey, bass (1986–1990)

=== Other ===
- Graham Senmark, producer and studio engineer (1986–present)

== Discography ==
=== Albums ===
- Deaf by Dawn! (1991, Fixing a Hole)
- Cumagutza (2000, Fixing a Hole)

=== EPs ===
- The Strookas EP (1987, Unknown)
- Summer to Fall EP (1990, Moving Change)

=== Demos ===
- First 4-Track Demo (1986)
- Bathe in Plankton (1987)

=== Compilations ===
- What You Want to Hear, collection of unreleased and album tracks from 1991–2000. (2006, Engineer/Moving Change)
- Summer to Fall, collection of songs from EPs and demos. (2008, Fixing a Hole)
