= Fire Dept =

British punk rock group

The Fire Dept at Toe-Rag Studios, Shoreditch, c.1993. Left to right: Neil Palmer, Neale Richardson, Robin Taylor

The Fire Dept (1987–2004) were a British punk rock group. The main core of the band over the years comprised Neil Palmer on guitar and vocals, Neale Richardson on bass and Robin Taylor on drums. Johnny Johnson of Thee Headcoats (and also of The Cannibals) played bass on stage from 1995 to 1997, and on the Fire Dept's Elpee for Another Time (1996).

== History ==
The Fire Dept were a punk rock group started in 1987 in Cambridge, England, that played in the same garage rock or garage punk genre (also known at that time as 60s punk) as many other bands in the British Isles during the late 1980s and early 1990s, most notably Thee Headcoats and The Thanes.

In 1988, the Fire Dept moved to Brighton and mainly performed locally and in London, where they played most often at the Wild Western Rooms, in the back room of the St John's Tavern, Archway, which was the monthly home of Thee Headcoats throughout the 1990s. It was there that they supported many 1960s beat groups rediscovered and encouraged to reform by the promoter, Slim Chance.

Billy Childish released the Fire Dept's second single, "Last One There" b/w "She Saw Me", on his Hangman's Daughter label in 1995. Later that year, Childish produced the Fire Dept's first album, L'Oeuf d'Or, all the material on which was recorded by Liam Watson during various sessions at Toe Rag Studios, in its original location in Shoreditch, from 1991 to 1995. This first album was cited as an ancestor of The White Stripes' Elephant album by the analogue recording neo-pioneer and Black Keys producer, Mark Neill, who helped set up Toe Rag Studios in Hackney, after its move from Shoreditch.

Their second long-player, a punk rock concept album, Elpee for Another Time, was released through Yep! Records of Hove in 1996. This LP was accompanied by an explanatory booklet including a foreword by writer, subcultural pamphleteer, underground art historian, and activist, Stewart Home, and an essay by underground novelist, Simon Strong. Liam Watson included the Fire Dept's version of "Mental Block" (originally written by Sean Thomas and performed by the early-1980s Bristol mod band, The Reaction) as one of his favourite tracks on The Sympathetic Sounds Of Toe-Rag Studios, London, issued in 2002 by Sympathy for the Record Industry. A retrospective album of previously unreleased material, The History of Fen Punk, Vol. III, was issued by Cormorant Recordings of Brighton in 2003.

In 2004, the Fire Dept played for the last time with the Buff Medways at the Dirty Water Club in Tufnell Park, London. Neil Palmer formed The Vermin Poets with Billy Childish and Julie Hamper in early 2007.

== Discography ==
=== Singles ===
- "Girl, Girl, Girl, Girl" b/w "Witch Girl", "Girl and a Hotrod" and "7" by Kave-In, KI-0001 in 1988
- "Where D'You Keep Your Heart?" b/w "Baby I Got News For You", "7", Yep!, YEP01 in 1993
- "Last One There" b/w "She Saw Me", "7" by Hangman's Daughter, KETCH 1 UP in 1994

=== Albums ===
- L'Oeuf d'Or, LP, Hangman's Daughter, SCRAG 6 LP, 1995
- Elpee for Another Time, CD/LP, YEP 3, 1996
- The History of Fen Punk, Vol. III, CD, Cormorant Recordings, Cormorant LP 1, 2003
- A Flame from the Fen, CD, Damaged Goods, 2010

=== Compilation albums ===
- "Girl, Girl, Girl, Girl" on Strange Fish: The Cambridge Album, LP, Raven Records, SRT8KL 1550, 1988
- "Witch Girl" on Graveyard Stomp, LP, Anagram Records, GRAM 39, 1988
- "Your Touch On Me" on Hey Mom, the Garage Is on My Foot, CD/LP, Damaged Goods, 1996
- "The Group Templar" on The Thing From Another World: Supernerdmobile!, Free CD with the 18th issue of The Thing magazine (Greece), THR 006, 1997
- "Mental Block" on The Sympathetic Sounds Of Toe-Rag Vol. 1, LP/CD, Sympathy for the Record Industry, SFTRI 695, 2002

=== Songs recorded by others ===
- "She Saw Me", by 7 & 7 Is on Cheat Death, CD, 2003
- "Last One There", by The A-Lines on You Can Touch, CD/LP, Sympathy for the Record Industry, 2005

=== Recordings played on by Fire Dept members ===
- Vibrasonic, "Vibrasonic", CD/LP, Yep! Records, 1995 (Neil Palmer, bass on one track)
- Vibrasonic, "Instrumental Vibrations", CD/LP, Yep! Records, 1997 (Neil Palmer, bass on a couple of tracks)
- Stewart Home Comes In Your Face (on a split CD with Dolphins, PUNKROCKDRUNK LIVE), Sabotage Editions, 1998, HNTSAB 001 (Rob Taylor, drums, and Neil Palmer, bass — credited under pseudonyms)
- Long Bone Trio, "Oscar flies in the face of reason/Fat Head", 7" Vinyl, Productus, 2008] (Rob Taylor, guitar)
- Long Bone Trio, "Chainey Pieces", CD Album, Lap Records, 2009 (Rob Taylor, guitar)
