= Jamie Reid =

English visual artist (1947–2023)

- Born: Jamie Macgregor Reid; 16 January 1947; London, England
- Died: 8 August 2023 (aged 76); Liverpool, England
- Known for: Décollage
- Notable work: "God Save the Queen" "Never Mind the Bollocks, Here's the Sex Pistols"
- Partners: Margi Clarke (former); Maria Hughes
- Children: 1

The Sex Pistols logo designed by Jamie Reid in 1977

Jamie Macgregor Reid (16 January 1947 – 8 August 2023) was an English visual artist. His best known works include the record cover for the Sex Pistols single "God Save the Queen", which was lauded as "the single most iconic image of the punk era."

== Early life and education ==
Jamie Macgregor Reid was born in London on 16 January 1947 and grew up in Croydon. He was educated at John Ruskin Grammar School. In 1962, he began to study at Wimbledon Art School, then enrolled in Croydon Art School in 1964. With Malcolm McLaren, he took part in a sit-in at Croydon Art School.

== Career ==
Reid's work often featured letters cut from newspaper headlines in the style of a ransom note, particularly in the UK; he created the ransom-note style while he was designing for Suburban Press, a radical political magazine he founded in 1970. His best known works include the Sex Pistols album Never Mind the Bollocks, Here's the Sex Pistols, and the singles "Anarchy in the U.K.", "God Save the Queen" (based on a Cecil Beaton photograph of Queen Elizabeth II, with an added safety pin through her nose and swastikas in her eyes, described by Sean O'Hagan of The Observer as "the single most iconic image of the punk era"), "Pretty Vacant", and "Holidays in the Sun". The image from "God Save the Queen" was named "the greatest record cover of all time" by Q magazine in 2011 and later became part of the collection in the National Portrait Gallery.

Reid produced a series of screen prints in 1997, the twentieth anniversary of the birth of punk rock. Ten years later, on the thirtieth anniversary of the release of "God Save the Queen", Reid produced a new print entitled "Never Trust a Punk", based on his original design which was exhibited at London Art Fair in the Islington area of the city. He also produced artwork for the world music fusion band Afro Celt Sound System.

Reid's exhibitions included Peace is Tough at The Arches in Glasgow, and at the Microzine Gallery in Liverpool, where he lived. From 2004, he exhibited and published prints with the Aquarium Gallery, where a career retrospective, May Day, May Day, was held in May 2007. Starting in 2004, he exhibited and published work at Steve Lowe's new project space the L-13 Light Industrial Workshop in Clerkenwell, London.

In 2009, following allegations Damien Hirst was to sue a student for copyright infringement, Reid called him a "hypocritical and greedy art bully" and, in collaboration with Jimmy Cauty, produced his For the Love of Disruptive Strategies and Utopian Visions in Contemporary Art and Culture image as a pastiche, replacing the God Save The Queen with God Save Damien Hirst.

In October 2010, U.S. activist David Jacobs, founder of the early 1970s Situationist group Point-Blank!, challenged claims that Reid created the "Nowhere Buses" graphic which appeared on the sleeve to the Sex Pistols' 1977 single "Pretty Vacant" and has subsequently been used many times for limited edition prints. Jacobs said he created the design, which first appeared in a pamphlet as part of a protest about mass transit in San Francisco in 1973.

Reid was also involved in direct action campaigns on issues including the poll tax, Clause 28, and the Criminal Justice Bill.

== Personal life ==
His former partner was actress Margi Clarke, with whom he had a daughter.

Reid's great-uncle was George Watson MacGregor Reid, a modern Druid who established and led the Church of the Universal Bond. Reid was an honorary bard in the Order of Bards, Ovates and Druids and worked with Philip Carr-Gomm, the order's former Chosen Chief, to produce a book on the eight festivals of the Druidic calendar.

Reid died on 8 August 2023, at the age of 76, at home in Liverpool.
