= The Prisoners (band) =

British garage rock band

- Origin: Rochester, Kent, England
- Genres: Garage rock; Neo-psychedelia; Mod revival
- Years active: 1980–1986, 1997
- Labels: Big Beat, Stiff
- Past members: Graham Day; James Taylor; Allan Crockford; Johnny Symons

The Prisoners are a British garage rock band formed in 1980 in Rochester, Kent, England. Their 1960s garage sound made them a regular live fixture in London's underground "psychedelic revival" and "mod revival" scene of the early 1980s, as well as a linchpin of the Medway scene.

== History ==
The Prisoners line-up was: Graham Day (vocal and guitar), James Taylor (Vox Continental and Hammond Organ), Allan Crockford (bass) and Johnny Symons (drums). Fans speculated about the origin of the band's name, with many believing it was derived from the 1960s TV series The Prisoner; however, Graham Day later stated that it came from the title of the first single, released in 1979, by The Vapors (who later scored a hit with "Turning Japanese"). The band's sound combined catchy, retro-flavoured melodies, punky guitar riffs, a distinctive vocal style and a lead instrument of the then-unfashionable Vox Continental organ. Part of the Medway scene, often referred to as the 'Medway Delta', they often toured with Thee Milkshakes, with whom they appeared in an edition of Channel 4's The Tube dressed in Star Trek outfits. The band were adopted by the Mod revival, despite never considering themselves a mod band, and are widely considered to be one of the best bands from the 1980s mod scene. The Prisoners did not have much commercial success during their active years, but were later hailed as an influence on the Madchester sound of bands such as The Charlatans.

The band released their first album, A Taste of Pink, in 1982. Most of the songs were written by Graham Day. After releasing several self-financed records and spending a year with Big Beat Records, they made a final album, In From The Cold in 1986 for Stiff Records on their subsidiary label "Countdown", run by Eddie Piller. After failing to find commercial success, the band split later in 1986. They have reformed for several live shows since then, and released a final one-off single in 1997.

Bassist Allan Crockford produced the single "Strawberries are Growing in My Garden (and It's Wintertime)" by fellow Medway band, The Dentists. He joined James Taylor in the James Taylor Quartet. Graham Day continues to perform in a number of different beat combos, such as the Solar Flares, and MBEs alongside Billy Childish and Wolf Howard.

== Post break-up activities ==
Since splitting up the members of The Prisoners have featured in a wide range of bands. James Taylor and Allan Crockford formed mainstream jazz funk band the James Taylor Quartet in 1986, although Allan Crockford is no longer part of their line-up. The Solarflares, who released four albums before splitting up in 2004, were Graham Day and Allan Crockford basically reprising The Prisoners sound along with drummer Wolf Howard and Mr Parsley on organ. Other bands who have featured former members of The Prisoners are Planet, The Buff Medways, The Prime Movers, Thee Mighty Caesars, The Stabilisers and The Galileo 7. Day fronted Graham Day & the Gaolers, who released their first album, Soundtrack to the Daily Grind, in November 2007. Their second album Triple Distilled was released on the Damaged Goods label in 2008.

In 2014 A Taste of Pink was re-released again by Ace Records.

== Discography ==
=== Studio albums ===
- A Taste of Pink! [Own-Up – 1982]
- The Wisermiserdemelza [Big Beat – 1983]
- The Last Fourfathers [Own-Up – 1985]
- In From the Cold [Countdown – 1986]
- Morning Star [Own-Up - 2024]

=== Compilation albums ===
- The Revenge of The Prisoners [Pink Dust – 1984] (U.S Compilation)
- Rare and Unissued [Hangman – 1988]
- Hurricane: The Best of The Prisoners CD [Big Beat – 2004]

=== Live albums ===
- Thee Milkshakes vs. The Prisoners [Media Burn Records −1984]

Melanie/Reaching My Head/Hurricane/American Jingle/96 Tears/A Taste of Pink//Love My Lies

- The Last Night at the MIC [Empire Records – 1985]

Coming Home/Revenge of the Cybermen/There's A Time/Runaway/Little Shadows/Sitting on My Sofa/Don't Call My Name.

=== Extended plays ===
- Electric Fit [Big Beat – 1984]

Melanie/What I Want/The Last Thing on Your Mind/Revenge of the Cybermen

- There's A Time – 10 Inch Single [Munster Records – 1999] Spanish Release

There's a Time/Revenge of the Cybermen/I'm Looking For You/96 Tears

=== Singles ===
- "Hurricane"/"Tomorrow She Said" [Big Beat – 1983]
- "There's A Time"/"Revenge of the Cybermen" [Sky Dog – 1983] French Release
- "Whenever I'm Gone"/"Promised Land" [Countdown – 1986]
- "Whenever I'm Gone" / "Promised Land", "Gravedigger" – 12 Inch Single [Countdown – 1986]
- "Shine on Me"/"Judgement Song" [Deceptive – 1997]
- "Shine on Me" / "Judgement Song" / "Small" CD single [Deceptive – 1997]

=== Compilation EPs ===
- Four on 4 [Big Beat – 1984] Included the track Reaching My Head, along with Thee Milkshakes Out of Control, The Sing-Rays Come on Kid, and Tall Boys Ride This Torpedo.
