= Mambo Taxi =

British indie band

- Origin: London, England
- Genres: Garage punk, riot grrrl, indie pop
- Years active: 1991–1995
- Label: Clawfist
- Past members: Lenie Mets; Delia Sparrow; Andrea Stallard; Karin Rapp; Ella Guru; Anjali Bhatia

Mambo Taxi were an English, London-based British indie band, linked with riot grrrl, who formed in 1991 and split up in 1995.

== History ==
Mambo Taxi were inspired by the UK garage rock scene and US punk. They formed after Lenie was invited to join Anjali, Ella, Andrea and Delia - who were all living together (bar Delia) in a squat in Islington - to form a band. They became part of a vibrant music scene in the early 1990s which centered around three indie labels in London at the time, namely Clawfist, Too Pure and Wiiija. Their sound was a mixture of garage, punk, and pop and they had links to British riot grrrl bands such as Huggy Bear. Drummer Anjali Bhatia left in 1992 in order to form the Voodoo Queens and guitarist Ella Guru joined her in 1993. The other members of the 1992 line-up appearing on the first single - a double 'A' side of "Prom Queen" written by Anjali and "Insecure" written by Lenie - were: Lenie (lead vocal/bass), Delia (guitar/vocals) and Andrea (organ/vocals). Karin Rapp (drums/vocals) joined the band from the second single onwards.

After the departure of Anjali and Ella the band went on to record one album In Love With, featuring songs composed by all band members, but with lyrics mostly written by Lenie, covering topics as diverse as sexual abuse ("Velvet Youth" written by Lenie), religion ("Evangelical" written by Andrea) and women's issues such as single motherhood ("Push that Pram" written by Lenie), depression and self-harm ("Happy Claire" written by Karin Rapp); all other tracks were written by Lenie including the 'hit' single "Poems on the Underground" and the non-album single "Do you Always Dress Like That..." Mambo Taxi videos were early works by Nicholas Abrahams.

The band's name was taken from the film Women on the Verge of a Nervous Breakdown by Pedro Almodovar and was a reference to the taxi used by the film's heroine. Ella Guru, in an interview with NME's Sam Stallard in 1992, described it as "tacky" but "with all sorts of different things in it that sort of clash, but everything’s useful as well as fun." thus describing the band. Lenie is from Belgium; Delia, Andrea and Anjali are British, Karin comes from Germany and Ella from Ohio.

== Post break-up ==
Following the band's dissolution, Lenie formed Jolt with former Senseless Things frontman Mark Keds, they formed their own label 'Scared of Girls' and were signed by Warner Chappell. They released an EP Punk Jungle Rules and several singles. She briefly played in Square Mile Group and has been writing music ever since whilst bringing up a family. She has contributed songs to plays and the Libertines song, "Can't Stand Me Now", which features lyrics taken from a song written by Lenie and Mark Keds recorded in Brittania Row Studios called "Walking in LA".

Delia went on to be in the Phantom Pregnancies along with members of Huggy Bear and Wat Tyler. She later appeared in the line-up of Baby Birkin, the Family Way and the A-Lines, as well as Manic Coughh, the Schla La Las, the Action Time, the Werewandas, and others.

Delia and Karin were also in short-lived band Punjab Rovers, a collaboration with Cornershop which produced one 7" single.

Delia and Andrea are currently in Ye Nuns (previously The Nuns), a cover band which plays songs by The Monks, alongside Debbie Smith, formerly of Echobelly and Curve, Charley Stone, formerly of Salad/Gay Dad, and Debbie from thee Headcoatees.

== Discography ==
=== Singles ===
- "Prom Queen" / "Insecure" (Clawfist, HUNKA 13, 1993)
- "Poems On The Underground" / "A&E" (Clawfist, HUNKA 19, 1993)
- "Do You Always Dress Like That In Front Of Other Peoples Boyfriends?" / "I Want To Marry A Serial Killer" (Clawfist, HUNKA 20, 1993)
- "Tom" (Echostate, Echo 5-6, 1995) - split single with Breed

=== Album ===
In Love With… (Clawfist, HUNKALP7, 1994)

Track listing:
Pink Side

- "Tom"
- "Kiss Kiss Kiss"
- "Belgian Blues"
- "2 Nice Boys"
- "Happy Claire"
- "(Push That) Pram (Under The Train)"
- "Evangelical"

Green Side

- "Screaming In Public"
- "Poems On The Underground"
- "Reasons To Live"
- "Insecure"
- "My Room"
- "Velvet Youth"

=== Compilations ===
- V/A – Seek Refuge From Your Intolerable Situation, Say No To Male Violence (Garden Of Delights, 1994) Features the track "Foolish Little Girl"
- V/A – Gay Pride (You Don’t Know What You’re Missing) (Rugger Bugger, 1994) Features the track "Brett From Suede (It's About Time You Got Laid) By A Man"
