= Thee Headcoats =

English rock/punk band

- Origin: Chatham, Kent, England
- Genres: Garage rock, punk rock, garage punk
- Years active: 1989–2000, 2023–present
- Labels: Hangman Records, Get Hip, Crypt Records, Shakin' Street, Sub Pop, Damaged Goods, Birdman Records, Vinyl Japan
- Past members: Billy Childish; Bruce Brand; Johnny 'Tub' Johnson; Ollie Dolot; Allan Crockford; John Agnew

Thee Headcoats is a band formed in Chatham, Kent, England in 1989, that was notable for its garage rock sound. The band has been on multiple labels including Billy Childish's own Hangman Records, Damaged Goods and Sub Pop.

The band played their final concert on 12 May 2000 at the Dirty Water Club. Childish went on to play with other bands including The Buff Medways (1999 to 2006) and The Musicians of The British Empire (2007 to 2011).

== Lineup ==
The band was composed of Billy Childish (guitar and vocals), Bruce Brand (drums and backing vocals), and Johnny 'Tub' Johnson (bass). The band is the most prolific of Childish's many musical projects so far, releasing fourteen full-length albums.

The group originally featured Allan Crockford (ex-The Prisoners) (credited as Crojack on the first LP, Headcoats Down), followed by John Agnew (ex-Thee Mighty Caesars) then Ollie Dolat (co-founder of The Squares and founder of Mr Zero) on bass before Johnson joined.

Thee Headcoatees, an all-female vocal group consisting of Holly Golightly, Kyra LaRubia, Ludella Black, and (until leaving in 1999) Bongo Debbie, would often perform live with Thee Headcoats, and recorded several LPs with them as backing band. The band also recorded two albums as Thee Headcoats Sect, with members of The Downliners Sect.

== Career ==
Thee Headcoats had their roots in the British punk scene of the 1970s (both Billy and Bruce playing in The Pop Rivets and The Milkshakes). The band recorded songs by The Clash under the pseudonym Thee Stash. The band also recorded tribute albums to Bo Diddley and Jimmy Reed. Their debut album featured new versions of songs recorded by Son House including "John the Revelator" and "Child's Death Letter", both of which were later covered by The White Stripes.

== Reputation ==
The New York Times described Thee Headcoats as 'the king of garage rock'. Among the band's devotees is Jack White.

== Discography ==
=== Studio albums ===
- Headcoats Down! (1989) [mini LP]
- The Earls of Suavedom (1990)
- The Kids Are All Square- This Is Hip! (1990)
- Beach Bums Must Die (1990)
- Heavens to Murgatroyd, Even! It’s Thee Headcoats! (Already) (1990)
- W.O.AH! Bo in Thee Garage (1991) [Bo Diddley tribute album]
- Headcoatitude (1991)
- The Good Times Are Killing Me (1993)
- Thee Headcoats Conundrum (1994)
- In Tweed We Trust (1996)
- Deerstalking Men (1996) [as Thee Headcoats Sect]
- Knights of the Baskervilles (1996)
- The Jimmy Reed Experience (1997) [10" mini LP; Jimmy Reed tribute]
- The Messerschmitt Pilot's Severed Hand (1998)
- Brother is Dead… But Fly is Gone! (1998)
- 17% - Hendrix Was Not the Only Musician (1998)
- Ready Sect Go! (1999) [as Thee Headcoats Sect]
- I Am the Object of Your Desire (2000)
- Irregularis (The Great Hiatus) (2023)
- The Sherlock Holmes Rhythm 'n' Beat Vernacular (2025)
- Children of the Sect (2026)

=== Compilations and live ===
- The Wurst is Yet to Come (1993) [Live]
- Live at the Wild Western Room (1994) [featuring Thee Headcoatees]
- The Sounds of the Baskervilles (1995) [featuring Thee Headcoatees]
- Thee Headcoats Best: Sherlock Holmes Meets the Punkenstein Monster (1998) [Japanese Compilation]
- Thee English Gentlemen of Rock & Roll: Thee Headcoats Best Vol. II (1999) [Japanese Compilation]
- Elementary Headcoats – Thee Singles 1990-1999 (2001)
- Live at the Dirty Water Club (2001)

== See also ==
- Billy Childish
- Medway scene
