= Voodoo Queens =

English indie punk/riot grrrl band

- Origin: London, England
- Genres: Riot grrrl, punk rock, indie rock
- Years active: 1992–1999
- Labels: Too Pure, Voodoo Records, Strange Fruit
- Past members: Anjali Bhatia, Ella Guru, Stefania Lucchesini, Rajni Bhatia, Anjula Bhasker, Mary Deigan

The Voodoo Queens were an English, North London-based indie punk/riot grrrl band, who reached number one in the UK Indie Chart in 1993.

== History ==
The band was composed of Anjali Bhatia (guitar, vocals), Ella Guru (guitar, backing vocals), Stefania 'Steffi' Lucchesini (drums), Rajni Bhatia (keyboards) and Anjula Bhaskar (bass). Rebecca Lunn later stepped in for Anjula who had to leave to visit family in India. and Mary Deigan replaced her on bass in 1994.

In late 1992, Anjali left the group Mambo Taxi, in which she was the drummer, to start the Voodoo Queens, along with her sister Rajni and cousin Anjula, Ella Guru (also of Mambo Taxi), and drummer Sunny. After only one concert, they were offered a Peel session by BBC DJ John Peel. This was recorded in January 1993, whilst Anjali was still working at Virgin Megastore in Oxford Street. Other radio and TV appearances followed, including a further two Peel Sessions, and a busking competition against Boyzone on Channel 4's music and arts programme Naked City.

The music press, in addition to associating the band with the riot grrrl scene, also grouped them with other Asian-fronted bands such as Cornershop; Anjali felt that the press focused more on the music scene instead of the musical content.

Following the dissolution of the band, Ella Guru joined the Stuckist artists in 1999. Anjali went on to become a solo artist, releasing several albums of dance-orientated material on Wiiija Records. Deigan joined The Hangovers, and later, along with Ella Guru, the Deptford Beach Babes. Steffi briefly played with long-running all-female post-punk band Gertrude.

== Discography ==
=== Singles/EPs ===
- "Supermodel Superficial"/"Chocolate (Melt in Your Mouth)" (1993) Too Pure
- "Kenuwee Head"/"My Little Guitar Baby" (1993) Too Pure
- "F Is For Fame"/"I'm Not Bitter (I Just Want To Kill You) [Radio Nasty version]" (1994) Too Pure
- "Eat The Germs"/"Hairy"" (1995) Voodoo Records
- "Neptune"/"I'm Not Bitter (I Just Want To Kill You)" (1995) Dirt Records [US release]

=== Albums ===
- Chocolate Revenge (1994) Too Pure ("You're Dumped", "Princess of the Voodoo Beat", "Neptune", "Summer Sun", "I'm Not Bitter (I Just Want to Kill You)", "Faceache", "Indian Film Star", "Cactus Trees", "Shopping Girl Maniac", "Chocolate Eyes", "My Favourite Handbag")
- Peel Sessions (1994) Strange Fruit
