= Holly Golightly (singer) =

British musician (born 1966)

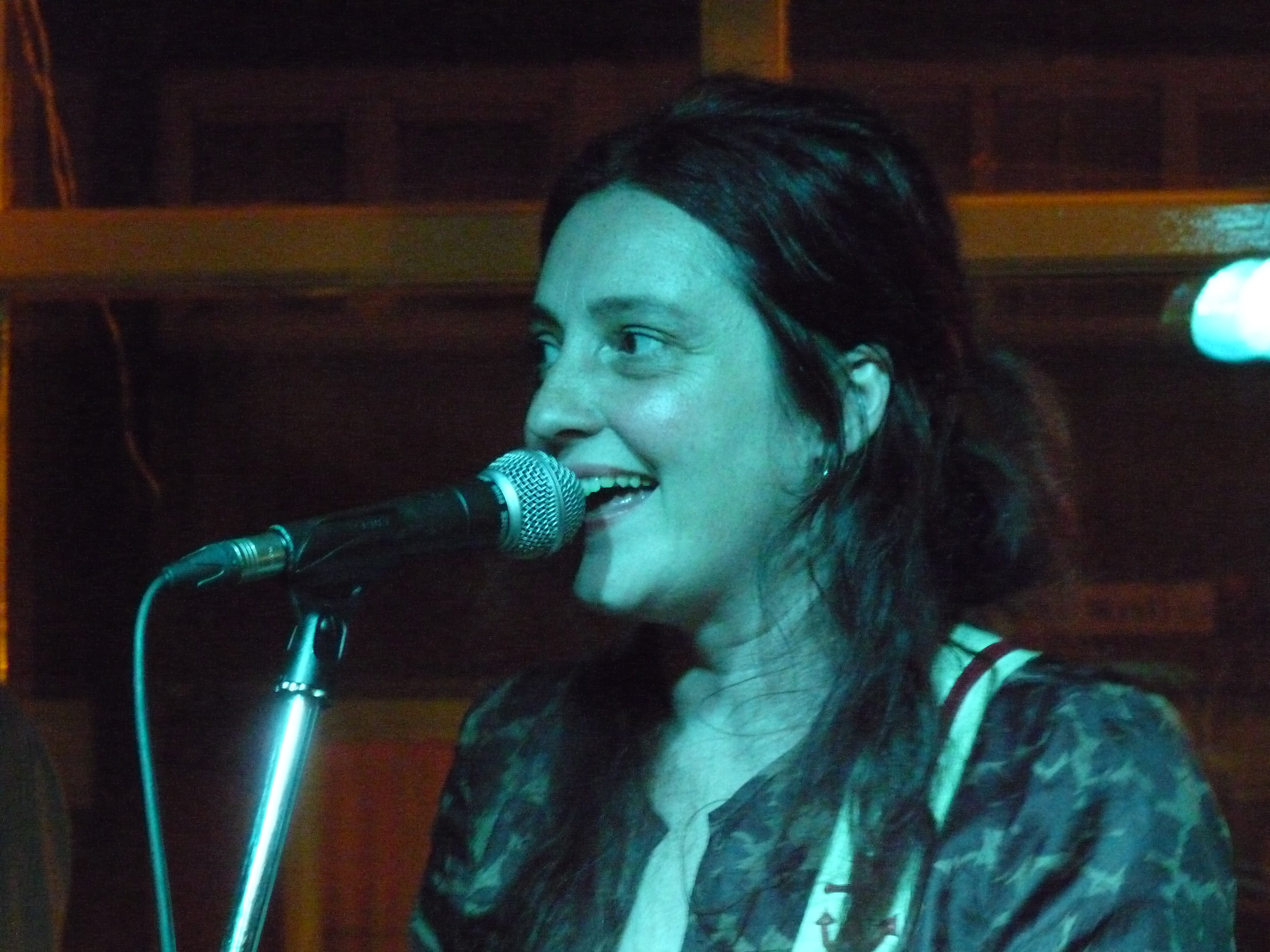
- Holly Golightly performing in London in 2009

Background information
- Also known as: Holly Golightly
- Born: Holly Golightly Smith; 7 September 1966 (age 59)
- Origin: London, United Kingdom
- Occupations: Singer, songwriter
- Instruments: Voice, guitar
- Labels: Damaged Goods; Sympathy for the Record Industry
- Website: www.hollygolightly.com (defunct)

Holly Golightly (born Holly Golightly Smith on 7 September 1966) is a British singer-songwriter. Her mother christened her after the main character of Truman Capote's Breakfast at Tiffany's. Her musical style ranges from garage rock to R&B.

== Musical career ==
While she was dating Thee Headcoats' drummer Bruce Brand, Holly appeared in an impromptu singing performance with his band. Thee Headcoats founder Billy Childish subsequently added her to the lineup of The Delmonas and changed their name to Thee Headcoatees. The group was primarily a garage band that backed up Thee Headcoats. Golightly started her solo career in 1995 but continued as an active member of Thee Headcoatees until they disbanded in 1999. In her solo career, she has drawn from rhythm and blues, rockabilly, and sounds of the 1960s and earlier. She is a collector of rare old songs which she often covers.

She has released 13 albums of her own and has collaborated with other acts, including Billy Childish, Rocket from the Crypt and the White Stripes. She has two songs on the soundtrack of the Jim Jarmusch film Broken Flowers: "There Is an End (featuring Holly Golightly)" by the Greenhornes (which also appears on the Greenhornes album Dual Mono), and "Tell Me Now So I Know" (found on her album Truly She Is None Other), a song written by Ray Davies.

=== 2000s ===
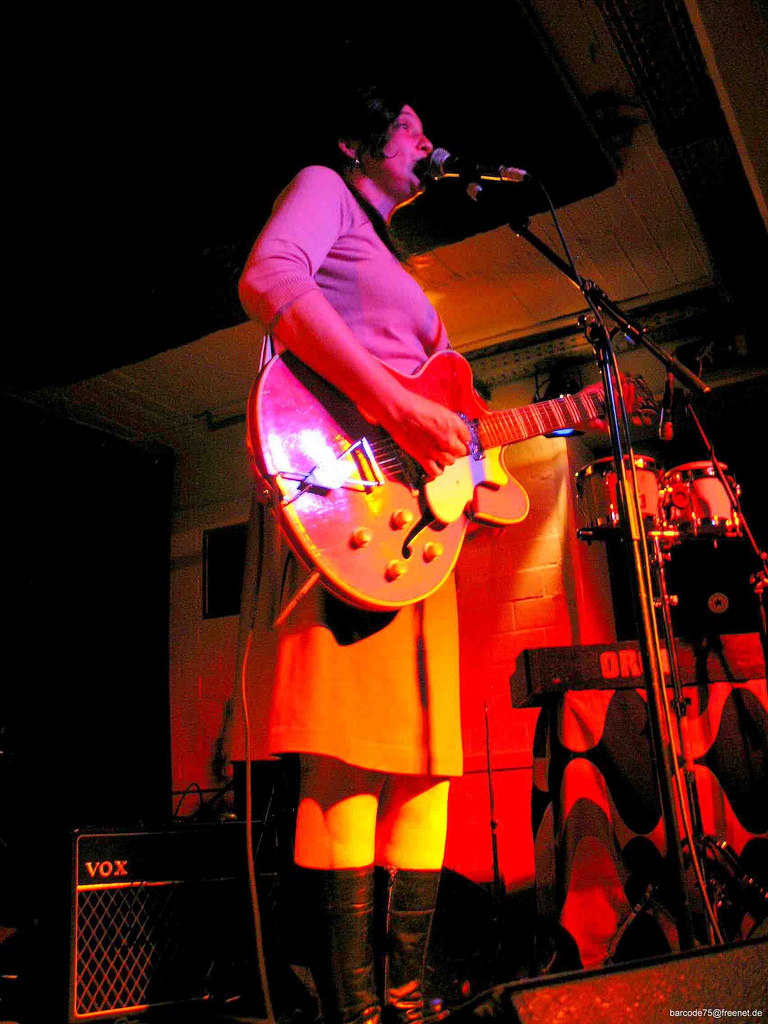
Performing in Munster, 2005

Golightly formed a duo in the mid-2000s, recording and touring extensively with longtime bandmate Lawyer Dave. Based in the United States, the duo, known as Holly Golightly and the Brokeoffs, released five albums and one EP between 2007 and 2012. Their first album, You Can't Buy a Gun When You're Crying, is a reference to comedian Lord Carrett's joke "I learned a lot from my second marriage... I learned they won't sell you a handgun if you're crying..." Holly Golightly & the Brokeoffs were winners at the ninth annual Independent Music Awards for Best Americana Album, with Dirt Don't Hurt. In 2003, she sang with the White Stripes on the track "It's True That We Love One Another" on their fourth album, Elephant. Time Out New York described her as an "English garage rock doyenne." In 2012, they released Sunday Run Me Over, their first album recorded entirely at their home in rural Georgia.

== Discography ==
=== LPs ===
- The Good Things (1995, Damaged Goods)
- The Main Attraction (1996, Damaged Goods)
- Laugh It Up (1996, Vinyl Japan)
- Painted On (1997, Sympathy for the Record Industry)
- Serial Girlfriend (1998, Damaged Goods)
- In Blood (1999, with Billy Childish, Damaged Goods)
- God Don't Like It (2000, Damaged Goods)
- Live in America (2000, Majestic Twelve Records)
- Desperate Little Town (2001, with Dan Melchior, Sympathy for the Record Industry)
- Truly She Is None Other (2003)
- Slowly but Surely (2004, Damaged Goods)
- Slowtown Now! (2015, Damaged Goods)
- Do the Get Along (2018, Damaged Goods)
- Look Like Trouble (2025, Damaged Goods)

Holly Golightly & the Brokeoffs

- You Can't Buy a Gun When You're Crying (2007)
- Nobody Will Be There (2007)
- Dirt Don't Hurt (2008)
- Medicine County (2010, Transdreamer Records)
- No Help Coming (2011, Transdreamer Records)
- Long Distance (2012, Damaged Goods)
- Sunday Run Me Over (2012, Transdreamer Records)
- All Her Fault (2014, Transdreamer Records)
- Coulda Shoulda Woulda (2015, Transdreamer Records)
- Clippety Clop (2018, Transdreamer Records)

=== Live albums and compilations ===
- Up the Empire (Live, 1998, Sympathy for the Record Industry)
- Live in America (2000)
- Singles Round-Up (2000, Damaged Goods)
- Down Gina's at 3 (Live, 2004)
- Live at Maxwell's 24 November 2004 (2004)
- My First Holly Golightly Album (2005, compilation with eight new songs)
- Down the Line (Compilation, 2006, Damaged Goods)
- nobody will be there (Holly Golightly & the Brokeoffs) (Live, 2011, Damaged Goods)

=== Singles, EPs ===
- Jiggy Jiggy with Holly Golightly EP (1994), Vinyl Japan
- "Virtually Happy" (1995), Damaged Goods
- Mary-Ann EP (1996), Vinyl Japan
- "No Big Thing" (1996), Hangman's Daughter
- "Girl in the Shower" (1996), Super Electro
- "Pinky Please Come Back" (1996), Super Electro
- "Come the Day" (1996), Damaged Goods
- "Believe Me" (1997), Sympathy for the Record Industry
- "Listen/Rain Down Rain" (1999), KRS
- "Walk a Mile" (2003), Damaged Goods
- "On the Fire" (2005), Damaged Goods
- "Christmas Tree on Fire" (2006), Damaged Goods
- "My 45" (2008), Damaged Goods (Holly Golightly & the Brokeoffs)
- "Devil Do" EP (2009), Transdreamer Records (Holly Golightly & the Brokeoffs)
- "Seven Wonders" (2015), Damaged Goods
