= Dan Melchior =

British musician

Dan Melchior is an English singer, songwriter and guitarist, often labeled a garage rock musician. He has formed the named groups of musicians Broke Revue and Dan Melchior und Das Menace.

== Background ==
Melchior grew up in Shepperton, Surrey, just outside London, England.

== Career ==
=== Broke Revue period ===
Melchior featured in 30 recordings as a solo performer, as a collaborator with Billy Childish and Holly Golightly and as a member of Dan Melchior's Broke Revue.

The Broke Revue released three albums, the first being on Sympathy for the Record Industry, the next two on In the Red Records. Their other works comprise singles and EPs for other labels. During their six touring years as a band they supported The White Stripes, The Fall, Mudhoney, The Jon Spencer Blues Explosion and Interpol, in shows in the United States before splitting up in 2004.

=== Post 2004 ===
After the split Melchior went on to produce further albums and appeared on the Jandek tribute album Down in a Mirror. His music has evolved significantly, to become a distant entity from some of his earlier blues-based work, showing a definite influence of more experimental bands such as The Homosexuals and The Fall, and some absurdist elements which have led to comparisons to compatriot exponents of that genre, Vivian Stanshall and Syd Barrett.

Melchior became a permanent resident in the United States in 1998 — first in Manhattan, New York with his wife Letha Rodman, followed by Durham, North Carolina.

Melchior continues to write and record prolifically in 2010 by which time he had established a project/band Dan Melchior und Das Menace. He has released six singles, a 12-inch ep and three LP albums.

== Album discography ==
as Dan Melchior unless stated

- Devil in the Flesh (SFTRI 1998) with Billy Childish
- This Love is Real (SFTRI 1999) Dan Melchior's Broke Revue
- Oldtime-Futureshock (Milou 2000) Dan Melchior's Broke Revue
- Heavy Dirt (In The Red 2001) Dan Melchior's Broke Revue
- Desperate Little Town (SFTRI 2001) with Holly Golightly
- Bitterness, Spite, Rage & Scorn (In The Red 2002) Dan Melchior's Broke Revue
- This is Not the Medway Sound (Smartguy 2003)
- The Covert Stomp 1993-2002 (Hate 2004) Dan Melchior Featuring Bruno Merrick Jones
- O, Clouds Unfold! (2004/released 2009 by Hook Or Crook) Dan Melchior's Broke Revue
- Hello, I'm Dan Melchior (Shake It 2005)
- Fire Breathing Clones on Cellular Phones (Plastic 2006)
- Christmas for the Crows (Daggerman 2008) Dan Melchior und das Menace
- Thankyou Very Much (SS 2009) Dan Melchior und das Menace
- Obscured by Fuzz (Topplers 2009) Dan Melchior und das Menace
- Visionary Pangs (SS 2010) Dan Melchior und das Menace
- Dan Melchior Und Das Menace (s/t tape, released by night people 2010)
- King of Sheep (Scotch Tapes 2011)
- Assemblage Blues (Siltbreeze 2011)
- Catbirds & Cardinals (Northern Spy 2011)
- Excerpts (and half speeds) (Kye 2012)
- The Backward Path (Northern Spy 2012)
- C.C.D.E Music (Little Big Chief 2013)
- The Heron (Limited Appeal 2013)
- K-85 (Homeless 2013)
- At Home With The Lloyd Pack (L'Espirit D'lescalier 2013) The Lloyd Pack
- A Squirrel Could Never Be A Disappointment To Me (CDR on Chocolate Monk) (2013)
- A Reverse Laurie Metcalf (cs, Bummer Tapes 2013)
- Rodman Melchior Melchior Rodman (S/T Cassette, Fabrica 2014)
- Slow Down Tiger (Starlight Furniture Company 2014)
- Rock And Roll (cdr, Chocolate Monk 2014)
- Live at Philadelphia Record Exchange (cs, Stale Heat Tapes 2014)
- Hunger (2014) Dan Melchior und das Menace
- All At Sea (NO=FI Records 2014)
- Happiness is Over Rated (Ultra Eczema, 2015)
- Australia's Big Things (Comfort 45, 2016)

== Discography of singles/extended play records ==
- Your love is mine/Laughing to keep from crying (1997) with Holly Golightly and Bruce Brand
- Wrong inside/Crow Jane (1999)
- Instant love/That's no way to get along (Robert Wilkins) (2000)
- Bad for my soul/Art Machine (2000)
- Andover, Duluth, London EP (2002)
- Garage Obituary 45- Remote control/Like a Fox (2003)
- Gudbye ta Sluggo EP (CD only) (2005)
- Span of Attention/To the River (2006)
- Your Lousy Floor EP (2006)
- Elev to Mezz/Gravy Train and Ice Cream Truck/Hippy! (2007)
- The Pink Scream ep (2007)
- Back in the village/Dog love (2007)
- Madame nhu/So real (2007)
- Stacked Sally Plummer - appears on The World's Lousy With Ideas 5 - Almost Ready Records (2008)
- She's so Blank/Certainly 14th st - Almost Ready Records (2008)
- Mr Oblivion/Piledriver Nitemare No. 2 (2009)
- The Post Office Line/Tourists - Columbus Discount Records (2009)
- Terrible shame/Ghost of a flea pt 2(2009)
- Dim are the lights/I don't wanna be nice - Convulsive Records (2009)
- Daylight robbery/A delicate genius backstage (split single with the Fresh and Onlys) (2009)
- Horrorshow (split single with The Spits) (2009)
- Counting calories at the last supper (split single with the Pheromoans) (2010)
- Red Nylon Valance/Dogbite Meltdown No. 2 (2011)
- YACHTS/Barry Mundane has plans/Stig and the Queefs (2012)
