= Slowly but Surely =

Studio album by Holly Golightly
- Released: October 11, 2004
- Recorded: Toe Rag Studios
- Genre: Indie rock
- Label: Damaged Goods
- Producer: Liam Watson

Holly Golightly chronology
Truly She Is None Other (2003)	Slowly but Surely (2004)	My First Holly Golightly Album (2005)

Professional ratings
Review scores
Source	Rating
Uncut	2/5 stars

Slowly but Surely is a studio album by singer-songwriter Holly Golightly, released in 2004.

== Track listing ==
Songs are by Holly Golightly unless otherwise indicated.

1. "On the Fire"
2. "The Luckiest Girl"
3. "My Love Is" (Billy Myles)
4. "Keeping On"
5. "Always and Forever"
6. "Dear John"
7. "In Your Head"
8. "Slowly but Surely" (Ollie Jones, Randy Hobbs)
9. "Through the Sun and Wine"
10. "All Grown Up"
11. "Won't Come Between"
12. "Mother Earth" (Peter Chatman, Louis Simpkins)

== Credits ==
- Holly Golightly – vocals and rhythm guitar
- Ed Deegan – Lead guitar and bottleneck
- Matt Radford – Double bass
- Bruce Brand – drums and percussion
- The Bongolian – Organ, piano and percussion
- Little Ed – Guitar and sitar
- Baine Watson – 6-string bass
