= Sexton Ming =

British artist, poet and musician (born 1961)

Sexton Ming (born 1961) is a British artist, poet and musician who was a founding member of The Medway Poets (1979) and Stuckism art movement (1999).

== Life and career ==
Ming was born in Gravesend, Kent, England. In 1979 he was one of the founder members of The Medway Poets group. He is an old associate of Billy Childish and collaborated with him on albums and films up until 2008 when Ming severed contact with Childish. Ming and Childish began recording again in 2011 and released a new collaborative release in 2012.

He performed in various Medway scene bands including Auntie Vegetable with Allan Crockford aka Rock Action (bass), Ian Smith aka Kid Aphrodite (drums), Sexton Ming aka Jive Phaser (vocals), James Taylor aka Dan Stardust (organ). The Gruffmen with Martin Waller (sax), Sexton Ming (drums), Allan Crockford (bass) and Russ Wilkins (guitar). The Mindreaders with Sexton Ming (guitar), Russ Wilkins (guitar), and "Rocking" Richard Inman (drums).

In 1999, Ming was one of the 13 original members of the Stuckists, a pro-figurative painting, anti-conceptual art, group, which was co-founded by fellow Medway Poets, Billy Childish and Charles Thomson. He exhibited in the group's shows, most notably being one of the "featured artists" in their first national museum exhibition, The Stuckists Punk Victorian, at the Walker Art Gallery during the 2004 Liverpool Biennial. He left the Stuckists in 2005 to pursue a solo career. He exhibits at the L-13 Gallery, London. In 2012, Ming contributed artwork to "The King of The Shale" single by Ex-Hefner guitarist Jack Hayter on Audio Antihero records.

He is married to Stuckist artist Ella Guru.

== Discography ==
=== Solo albums, unless stated otherwise ===
- Old Horse of the Nation (1987) [Billy Childish appears on most tracks]
- Ban the Mindreader (1987) [The Mindreaders]
- Six More Miles to the Graveyard (1988)
- Birds With Teeth (1991)
- Master of Gibberish (1993)
- Endless Discipline (1993) [Sexton Ming and The Diamond Gussets]
- Rogue Male (1997) [Sexton Ming and Steady]
- Marshan Love Secrets (1998)
- A Lifetime of Nervous Gutaches #1: Rare Recordings 1979–2002 (2003)
- Crumb Girl (2003)
- Funk Child (2004)
- Out to Stud (2005)
- A Lifetime of Nervous Gutaches Volume 2: Rare Recordings 1979–2005 (2005)
- A Taste of Wood (2006) [Sexton Ming and Stout]
- Punks are sad, Hippies are cool (2007)
- A Lifetime of Nervous Gut Aches Vol. 3 Rare recordings 1979–2010 (2010)
- Live at the 12 Bar (2010) [The Talented Losers (Sexton Ming and Colin Shaddick)]
- We Steal your Girlfriend (2010) [The Talented Losers (Sexton Ming and Colin Shaddick)]
- Hotchicu Blues (2010) [The Talented Losers (Sexton Ming and Colin Shaddick)]
- For the Love of Scrap (2011) [The Talented Losers (Sexton Ming and Colin Shaddick)]
- Beer Mat Chronicles (2011) [The Talented Losers (Sexton Ming and Colin Shaddick)]
- Coming Face to Face (2012)

=== With Billy Childish ===
- Which Dead Donkey Daddy? (1987)
- Plump Prizes & Little Gems (1987)
- Ypres 1917 Overture (Verdun Ossuary) (1988)
- The Cheeky Cheese (1999)
- Here Comes the Fleece Geese (2002)
- Dung Beetle Rolls Again (2012)

== See also ==
- The Medway Poets
- Stuckism
- The Stuckists Punk Victorian
- Ella Guru
- Billy Childish
- Ivor Cutler
- Outsider music

== Sources ==
- Ed. Katherine Evans (2000), "The Stuckists" Victoria Press, ISBN 0-907165-27-3
- Ed. Frank Milner (2004), "The Stuckists Punk Victorian" National Museums Liverpool, ISBN 1-902700-27-9
