= You Can't Buy a Gun When You're Crying =

Studio album by Holly Golightly
- Released: 2007
- Recorded: December 2007
- Studio: Ramshackle Studios, London
- Genre: Rock and roll, roots rock, rockabilly, blues rock, folk rock
- Label: Damaged Goods

Holly Golightly chronology
My First Holly Golightly Album (2005)	You Can't Buy a Gun When You're Crying (2007)	Nobody Will Be There (2007)

You Can't Buy a Gun When You're Crying is the first album recorded by Holly Golightly and the Brokeoffs, a project involving Golightly's established United States band member Lawyer Dave.

== Track listing ==
All tracks composed by Dave Drake and Holly Golightly; except where noted.

1. "Devil Do" - 3:31
2. "Just Around the Bend" - 3:01
3. "Everything You Touch" - 2:27
4. "Medicine Water" - 3:31
5. "You Can't Buy a Gun" - 2:22
6. "Crow Jane" (Traditional; arranged by Dave Drake and Holly Golightly) - 2:34
7. "So Long" - 3:09
8. "Time to Go" - 2:11
9. "Black Heart" - 3:03
10. "Clean in Two" - 2:12
11. "Jesus Don't Love Me"
12. "I Let My Daddy Do That" (Clarence Williams, W.R. Calaway) - 2:37
13. "Whoopie Ti Yi Yo" (Traditional; arranged by Dave Drake and Holly Golightly) - 3:30
14. "Devil Don't" - 2:34
