= Medway scene =

Music from north Kent

The Medway scene consists of the bands and related cultural activities of the Medway Towns, north Kent, England. Main towns involved (from West to East) are Strood, Rochester, Chatham, Gillingham, and Rainham. The Medway scene is typically dated from the punk era of the late 1970s, when the presence of the Medway College of Design (later Kent Institute of Art & Design and now UCA Rochester) influenced a "vibrant art, poetry and music scene."

== History ==
Of Medway musicians, the best known is Billy Childish (from Chatham) who formed punk band the Pop Rivets in the late 1970s, and later formed the Milkshakes, Thee Mighty Caesars, Thee Headcoats, the Buff Medways, the Musicians of the British Empire and the Chatham Singers, among others. His inspiration has led to many other bands forming who now have a worldwide cult following. Other notable bands include the Prisoners, the Dentists, the Claim and Thee Headcoatees. The music often draws heavily on the tradition of garage/punk/rock'n roll/raw-blues music from the 1950s and 1960s, hence references to the "Medway Delta". Records have been released on Big Beat, Media Burn and other small indie labels, as well as Childish's own Hangman Records and Hangman's Daughter, and latterly Damaged Goods Records.
