= Thee Headcoatees =

English garage band

- Origin: Kent, England
- Genres: Garage rock revival, garage punk
- Years active: 1991–1999; 2025–present
- Labels: Vinyl Japan, Damaged Goods, Get Hip, Sympathy for the Record Industry
- Past members: Holly Golightly; Kyra LaRubia; Ludella Black; Debbie Green
- Website: Thee Headcoatees' Myspace page

Thee Headcoatees are an English all-female garage band formed in Chatham, Kent, England in 1991. They were part of the Medway scene. The members were Holly Golightly, Kyra LaRubia, Ludella Black and "Bongo" Debbie Green. After disbanding in 1999, the band reformed in 2025 and released the album Man-Trap.

== Formation ==
Thee Headcoatees were formed by Billy Childish as a backing group for his band Thee Headcoats. Ludella Black's previous band The Delmonas had performed the same function for Childish's earlier bands, starting with The Milkshakes. Their songs were principally written by Billy Childish and were songs that did not suit his own acts. After Holly Golightly did a cameo appearance with Thee Headcoats, Childish added her to The Delmonas lineup; soon thereafter the band was renamed Thee Headcoatees.

== History ==
As a backing band Thee Headcoatees initially would just do a few songs to warm up for Thee Headcoats. Their song "Headcoat Girl" on The Sisters of Suave even states "I wanna be a headcoat girl". In 1991 the band cut their first album Girlsville for Hangman Records. It consisted of songs written by Billy Childish and covers of songs by The Kinks (Last Plane Home), The Beatles (Run For Your Life), The Tamrons (Wild Man) and more. In 1998 Debbie Green left the band, which was reduced to a three piece for their final album, Here Comes Cessation. Thee Headcoatees continued to tour with Thee Headcoats until the group folded in 1999.

== Post break-up ==
Holly Golightly has gone on to pursue a solo career, recording more than ten LPs, and has worked with the bands The Greenhornes and The White Stripes and in her latter career has formed the band Holly Golightly & The Brokeoffs. Kyra LaRubia and Debbie Green went on to sing for The A Lines (featuring Delia from Mambo Taxi and Julie Hamper of Billy Childish's Musicians of the British Empire); Green and Black currently play in Ye Nuns. LaRubia and Black later appeared in The Shall I Say Quois alongside Julie Hamper, while Green also went on to play with Dutronc, Baby Birkin and The Speed of Sound; she also drummed and sang with Would-Be-Goods, and recorded in The Buffets, alongside Hamper.

== Reformation ==
The band reformed in 2025 and released Man-Trap that same year. Their cover of Fang's "The Money Will Roll Right In" peaked at 90 on the UK physical single charts in November 2025.

== Album discography ==
- Girlsville (1991)
- Have Love Will Travel (1992)
- Ballad of the Insolent Pup (1994)
- Bozstik Haze (1997)
- Punk Girls (1997)
- Here Comes Cessation (1999)
- The Sisters of Suave (1999) [singles compilation]
- Man-Trap (2025)
- Ev'rybody’s Gonna Be Happy (2026)
