= Billy Childish =

English artist (born 1959)

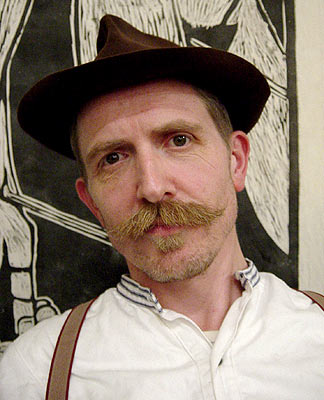
- Childish at The Aquarium L-13 in 2007

Background information
- Also known as: William Charlie Hamper; Bill Hamper; Bill Hamper-Childish; Guy Hamper; Jack Ketch; Gus Claudius; Danger Bill Henderson
- Born: Steven John Hamper; 1 December 1959 (age 66); Chatham, Kent, England
- Genres: Garage punk; garage rock; indie rock; punk blues; punk rock; ska; calypso
- Occupations: Singer; guitarist; record producer; artist; painter; author; poet; photographer; filmmaker
- Instruments: Vocals; guitar
- Years active: 1977–present
- Labels: Hangman; Damaged Goods; Sub Pop; Transcopic; Sympathy For The Record Industry; Big Beat; Get Hip; K; Amphetamine Reptile
- Member of: Wild Billy Childish & CTMF
- Formerly of: Pop Rivets; Thee Milkshakes; Thee Mighty Caesars; Thee Headcoats; The Buff Medways; Wild Billy Childish & the Musicians of the British Empire; The Vermin Poets; The Medway Poets
- Spouse: Julie Hamper

Billy Childish (born Steven John Hamper; 1 December 1959) is an English painter, author, poet, photographer, film maker, singer, and guitarist. Since the late 1970s, Childish has been prolific in creating music, writing, and visual art. He has led and played in bands including Thee Milkshakes, Thee Headcoats, and the Musicians of the British Empire, primarily working in the genres of garage rock, punk, and surf, and releasing more than 100 albums.

He is a consistent advocate for amateurism and free emotional expression. Childish co-founded the Stuckism art movement with Charles Thomson in 1999, which he left in 2001. Since then, a new evaluation of Childish's standing in the art world has been under way, culminating with the publication of a critical study of Childish's working practice by artist and writer Neal Brown, with an introduction by Peter Doig, which describes Childish as "one of the most outstanding, and often misunderstood, figures on the British art scene". He is a visiting lecturer at Rochester Independent College. In July 2014 Childish was awarded an honorary Doctor of Arts Degree from the University of Kent.

He is known for his explicit and prolific work – he has detailed his love life and childhood sexual abuse, notably in his early poetry and the novels My Fault (1996), Notebooks of a Naked Youth (1997), and Sex Crimes of the Futcher (2004) – The Idiocy of Idears (2007), and in several of his songs, notably in the instrumental "Paedophile" (1992) (featuring a photograph of the man who sexually abused him on the front cover) and "Every Bit of Me" (1993). From 1981 until 1987, Childish had a relationship with artist Tracey Emin.

== Background ==
Billy Childish, The Drinker, oil painting, 1996

Billy Childish was born, lives, and works in Chatham, Kent. He has described his father, John Hamper, as a "complex, sociopathic narcissist": Hamper was jailed during Childish's teenage years for drug smuggling. Although he had an early and close association with many of the artists who became known as "YBA" artists, he has resolutely asserted his independent status. He was sexually abused when he was aged nine by a male family friend: "We were on holiday. I had to share a bed with him. It happened for several nights, then I refused to go near him. I didn't tell anyone".

He left secondary school at 16, an undiagnosed dyslexic. Refused an interview at the local art college, he entered Chatham Dockyard, Kent, as an apprentice stonemason. During the next six months (the artist’s only prolonged period of conventional employment), he produced some 600 drawings in "the tea huts of hell". On the basis of this work, he was accepted into Saint Martin's School of Art, where he was friends with the artist Peter Doig, to study painting. However, his acceptance was short-lived and he was expelled in 1982 before completing the course. He then lived on the dole for 15 years. In 2006, Childish turned down the offer to appear on Channel 4's Celebrity Big Brother. Childish has practised yoga and meditation since the early 1990s.

== Painting ==
As a prospective student lacking the necessary entry qualifications, Childish was accepted into art school four times on the strength of his paintings and drawings. He did a foundation year at Medway College of Design (now the University for the Creative Arts) in 1977–78, and was then accepted onto the painting department of Saint Martin's School of Art in 1978, before quitting a month later. He was re-accepted at St Martin's in 1980, but was expelled in 1982 for refusing to paint in the art school and other unruly behaviour. At Saint Martin's, Childish became friends with Peter Doig, with whom he shared an appreciation of Munch, Van Gogh, and blues music. Doig later co-curated Childish's first London show at the Cubit Street Gallery. In the early/mid 1980s Childish was a "major influence" on the artist Tracey Emin, whom he met after his expulsion from Saint Martin's when she was a fashion student at Medway College of Design. Childish has been cited as the influence for Emin's later confessional art. Childish has exhibited extensively since the 1980s, and was featured in the British Art Show in 2000. In 2010, a major exhibition of Childish's paintings, writing, and music was held at The ICA London, with a concurrent painting show running at White Columns Gallery in New York City. In October 2012, alongside Art Below, Childish presented his work at the exhibition Art Below Regents Park in Regent's Park Tube station to coincide with Frieze Art Fair, one of the most important international contemporary art fairs that takes place each October in London.

In 2013, Childish began a painting collaboration with Edgeworth Johnstone, later titled Heckel's Horse. Since 2013, after Charles Thomson (who co-founded Stuckism with Childish in 1999) introduced Childish to Johnstone's work, Heckel's Horse have made over 150 oil paintings, mostly on six foot Belgian linen canvases in Childish's studio at Chatham Dockyard in Kent. In 2024, Childish referred to Heckel's Horse as his "favourite work".

walking in gods buti, Oil and charcoal on linen (274.5 x 183 cm), 2013

clamming on maud, Oil and charcoal on linen (183 x 305 cm), 2013

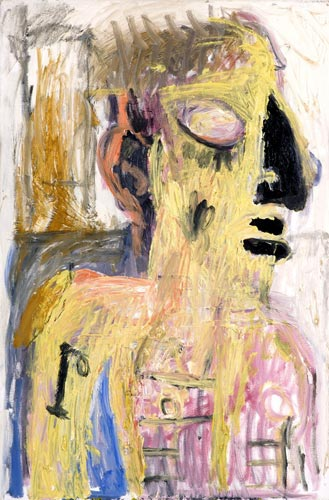
In 5 Minits You'll Know Me (sic), oil on canvas, 1997

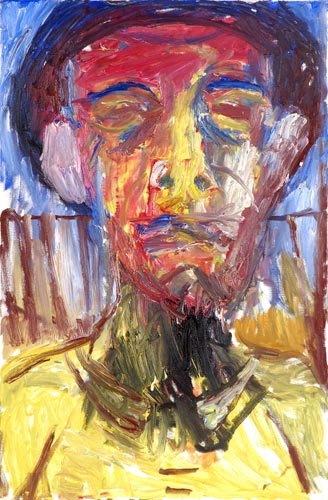
Thumbprint, oil on canvas, 1997

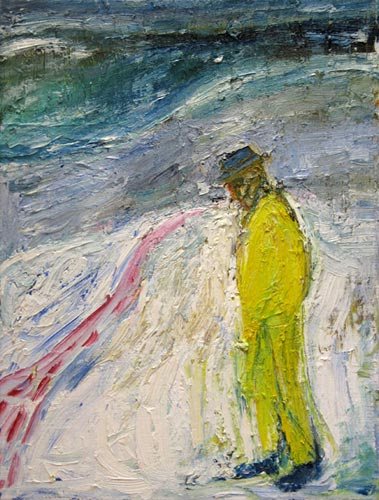
Man Walking in Snow, oil on canvas, 1999

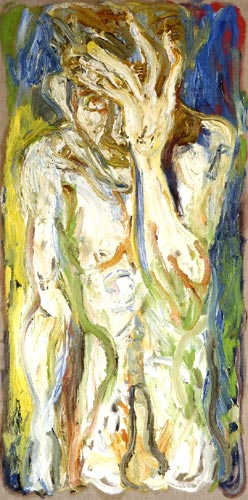
Hand on Face, oil on canvas, 2000

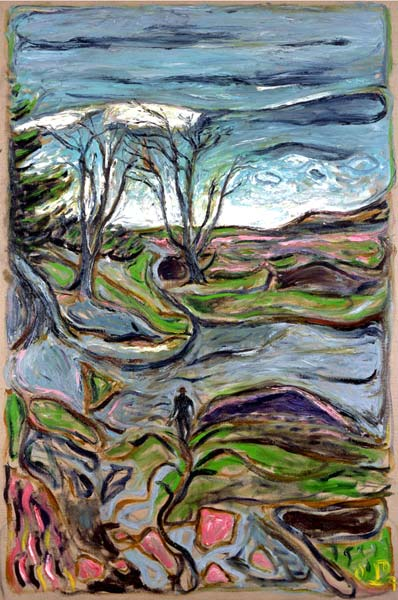
North Beach, San Francisco, oil on canvas, 2000

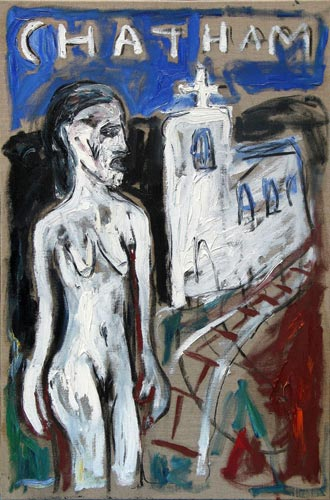
St. John's Church, Chatham, oil on canvas, 2000

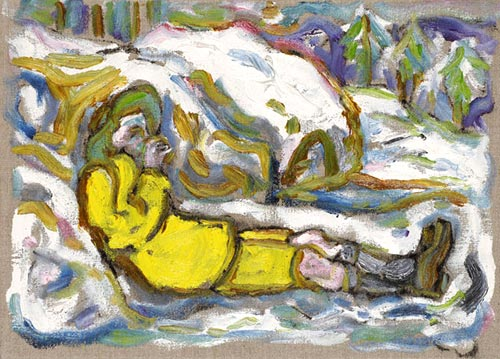
Tea Drinker, High Atlas, oil on canvas, 2007

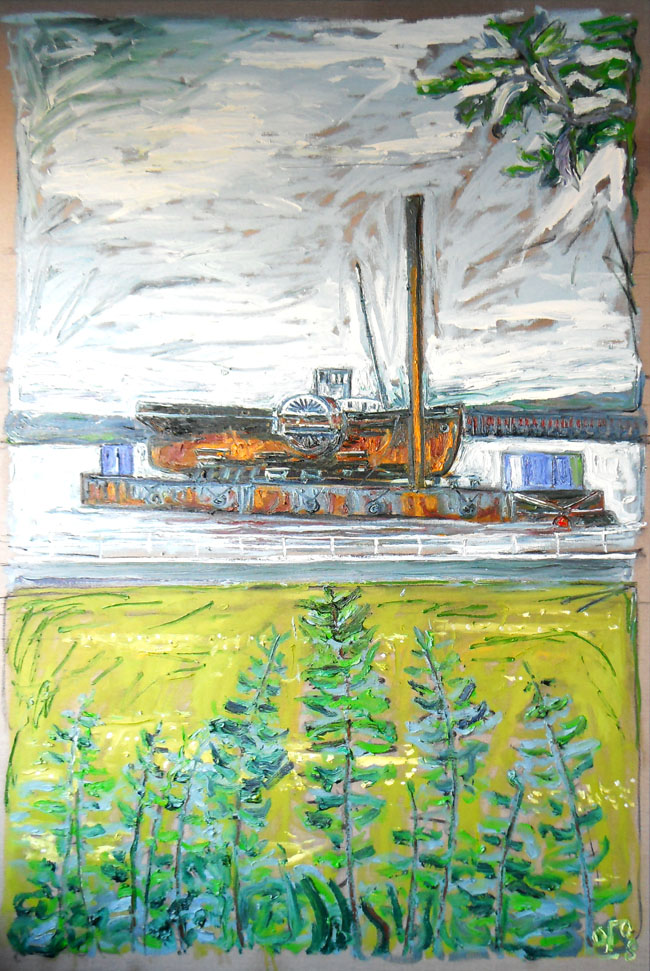
John H Amos 2, oil on canvas, 2008

== The British Art Resistance ==
In 2008, Childish formed the "non organisation" the British Art Resistance, and held an exhibition under the title Hero of the British Art Resistance at The Aquarium L-13 gallery in London: A collection of paintings, books, records, pamphlets, poems, prints, letters, film, photographs made in 2008.

== Music ==
Childish made records of punk, garage, rock and roll, blues, folk, classical/experimental, spoken word and nursery rhymes. In a letter to Childish, the musician Ivor Cutler said of Childish: "You are perhaps too subtle and sophisticated for the mass market." Childish's groups include TV21, later known as the Pop Rivets (1977–1980), sometimes spelled the Pop Rivits, with Bruce Brand, Romas Foord (replaced by Russell 'Big Russ' Wilkins) and Russell 'Little Russ' Lax.

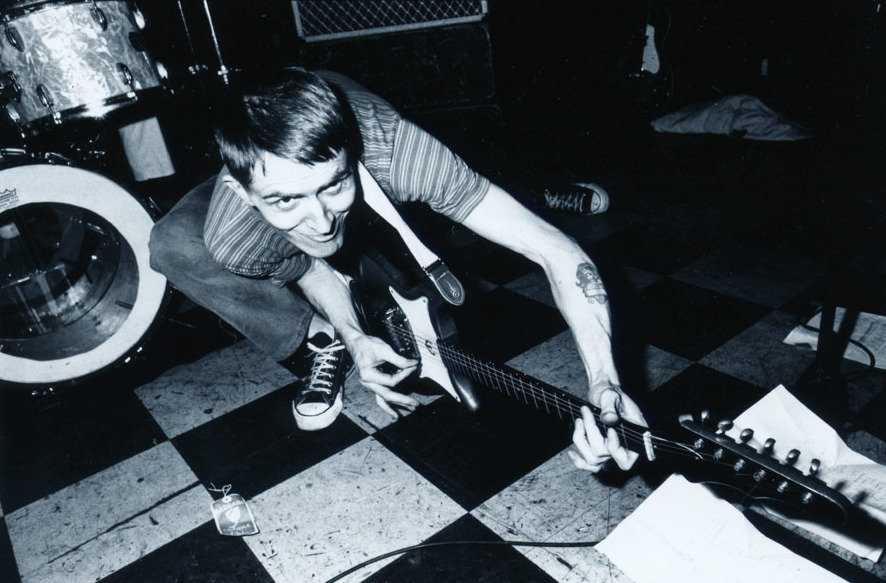
Childish at the Shinjuku loft, Japan (early 1990s)

He later formed a garage rock-inspired band called Thee Milkshakes (1980–1984) with Micky Hampshire, Thee Mighty Caesars (1985–1989), The Delmonas then Thee Headcoats (1989–1999). In 2000, he formed Wild Billy Childish and the Friends of the Buff Medways Fanciers Association (2000–2006), named after a type of poultry bred in his hometown. The Buff Medways, or the Buffs, as they were sometimes affectionately known, split in 2006, and Wild Billy Childish and the Musicians of the British Empire (MBEs) were born, recording a song about one of Childish's heroes, George Mallory, titled "Bottomless Pit". In early 2007, Childish formed The Vermin Poets with former Fire Dept singer and guitarist Neil Palmer and A-Lines guitarist and singer Julie Hamper, his wife. Thee Headcoats began their monthly residency at the Wild Western Room in the St John's Tavern, north London, in the early 1990s, and continued after moving to the Dirty Water Club in 1996. The MBEs played at the venue more or less once a month until February 2011.

On 11 September 2009, Damaged Goods Records – Childish's current label – issued a message to subscribers stating that Childish's wife Julie (Nurse Julie, bassist in the MBEs) was pregnant. Childish has since been recording as bass player with The Spartan Dreggs, with Neil Palmer on vocals and guitar and Wolf Howard on drums. From 2013, the MBEs reunited under the name Wild Billy Childish [or 'Chyldish'] and CTMF and as of the end of 2014 have released three albums.

In 2014, Childish produced, played on and co-wrote (with Dave Tattersall) most of the songs on The Wave Pictures album Great Big Flamingo Burning Moon.

Childish has been namechecked by a number of famous musicians, including Kurt Cobain, Graham Coxon, The White Stripes (Jack White had Childish's name written in large letters on his arm for an early Top of the Pops appearance), and Kylie Minogue, who named the LP Impossible Princess after his book Poems to Break the Harts of Impossible Princesses [sic].

== Poetry ==
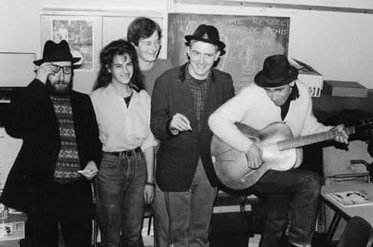
Sexton Ming, Tracey Emin, Charles Thomson, Billy Childish and musician Russell Wilkins at the Rochester Adult Education Centre 11 December 1987 to record The Medway Poets LP

Childish is a confessional poet and has published over 40 collections of his work. In 1979, Childish was a founder member of The Medway Poets, a poetry performance group, who read at the Kent Literature Festival and the 1981 international Cambridge Poetry Festival. There were, however, personality clashes in the group, particularly between Childish and Charles Thomson, who said: "There was friction between us, especially when he started heckling my poetry reading and I threatened to ban him from a forthcoming TV documentary."

However, a Television South documentary on the group in 1982 brought them to a wider regional audience, though Childish's poetry was "deemed unbroadcastable". According to Childish: "Me & Charles [sic] were at war from 1979 until 1999. He even threatened having bouncers on the doors of Medway Poets' readings to keep me out". Childish has twice won commendations in the National Poetry Prize.

== Tracey Emin ==
During the 1980s, Childish was an influence on the artist Tracey Emin, whom he met in 1982, after his expulsion from the painting department at Saint Martin's School of Art. Emin was a fashion student at Medway College of Design. Emin and Childish were a couple until 1987, Emin selling his poetry books for his small press Hangman Books. In 1995 she was interviewed in the Minky Manky show catalogue by Carl Freedman, who asked her, "Which person do you think has had the greatest influence on your life?" She replied:

Uhmm... It's not a person really. It was more a time, going to Maidstone College of Art, hanging around with Billy Childish, living by the River Medway.

Emin's work Everyone I Have Ever Slept With 1963–1995 (1995) was first exhibited in the show, and Childish's name was displayed prominently in it. (Note: "Everyone I Have Ever Slept With 1963–1995 by Tracey Emin (1995) (interior view).". Picture, 1995. , .)

== The Stuckists ==
In 1999 Childish and Thomson co-founded the Stuckist art movement. Thomson coined the group name from Childish's "Poem for a Pissed Off Wife" (Big Hart and Balls 1994), where he had recorded Emin's remark to him:

"Your paintings are stuck, you are stuck! – Stuck! Stuck! Stuck!"

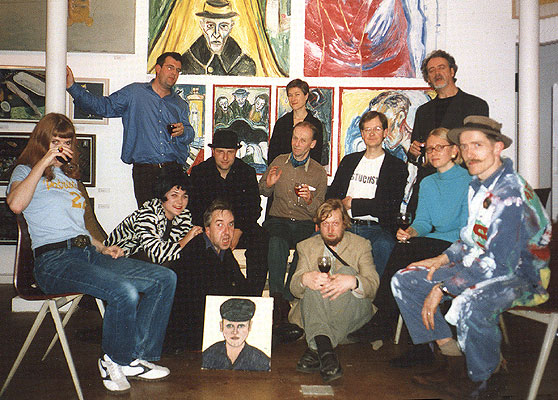
Billy Childish (far right) with the first Stuckists group at the Real Turner Prize Show, Pure Gallery, Shoreditch, London, in October 2000

The group was strongly pro-figurative painting and anti-conceptual art. Childish wrote a number of manifestos with Thomson, the first of which contained the statement:

"Artists who don't paint aren't artists."

The Stuckists soon achieved considerable press coverage, fuelled by Emin's nomination for the Turner Prize. They then announced the inauguration of a cultural period of Remodernism to bring back spiritual values into art, culture and society. The formation of The Stuckists directly led to Emin severing her 14-year friendship with Childish in 1999. Childish has said: "The Stuckist art group was formed in 1999 at the instigation of Charles Thomson, the title of the group being taken from a poem of mine written and published in 1994. I disagreed with the way Charles presented the group, particularly in the media. For these reasons I left the Stuckists in 2001. I never attended any Stuckist demonstrations and my work was not shown in the large Stuckist exhibition held in the Walker Art Gallery in 2004."

British artist Stella Vine, who was a member of the Stuckists for a short time in 2001, first joined the group having developed a "crush" on Childish while attending his music events. In June 2000, Vine went to a talk given by Childish and fellow Stuckist co-founder Charles Thomson on Stuckism and Remodernism, promoted by the Institute of Ideas at the Salon des Arts, Kensington. Vine formed The Unstuckists one month after joining, and has since said she did not agree with Stuckism's principles, and described them as bullies.

== Kurt Schwitters ==
As a young man, Childish was highly influenced by Dada, and the work of Kurt Schwitters in particular. Childish has a Kurt Schwitters poem tattooed on his left buttock and made a short film on Schwitters's life, titled The Man with Wheels, (1980, directed by Eugean Doyan).

== The Chatham Super 8 Cinema ==
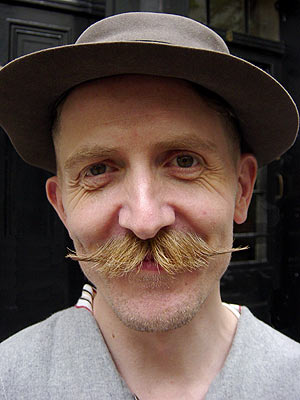
Childish in 2004

In 2002, along with Wolf Howard, Simon Williams and Julie Hamper, Childish formed The Chatham Super 8 Cinema. The group makes super 8 films on a second-hand camera Wolf Howard bought at a local flea market. In 2004, Childish released a 30-minute documentary titled Brass Monkey, about a march undertaken in Great War uniform commemorating the 90th anniversary of the British retreat from Mons in 1914.

== Discography ==
=== Solo LPs ===
- I've Got Everything Indeed (1987)
- The 1982 Cassettes (1988)
- "i remember..." (1988)
- 50 Albums Great (1991)
- Torments Nest (1993)
- Made With a Passion – Kitchen Demo's (1996)

Compilations

- I Am the Billy Childish (1991)
- Der Henkermann – Kitchen Recordings (1992)
- Native American Sampler – A History 1983–1993 (1993)
- Crimes Against Music-Blues Recordings 1986–1999 (1999)
- 25 Years of Being Childish (2002)
- My First Billy Childish Album (2006)
- Archive From 1959 – The Billy Childish Story (2009)
- Punk Rock Ist Nicht Tot – 1977–2018 (2019)

Spoken word albums

- Poems of Laughter and Violence (1988)
- The Sudden Fart of Laughter (1992)
- Trembling of Life (1993)
- Hunger at the Moon (1993)
- Poems of a Backwater Visionary (2007)

=== Collaborations ===
- Laughing Gravy (1987) Wild Billy Childish & Big Russ Wilkins
- Long Legged Baby (1989) Wild Billy Childish & the Natural Born Lovers
- At the Bridge (1993) Billy Childish with The Singing Loins
- Devil in the Flesh (1998) Billy Childish/Dan Melchior
- In Blood (1999) Billy Childish & Holly Golightly

=== with Sexton Ming ===
- Which Dead Donkey Daddy? (1987)
- Plump Prizes & Little Gems (1987)
- YPRES 1917 Overture (Verdun Ossuary) (1988)
- The Cheeky Cheese (1999)
- Here Come the Fleece Geese (2002)
- Muscle Horse Was in the War (2002)
- Dung Beetle Rolls Again (2012)

=== with The Pop Rivets ===
- (1979) Greatest Hits
- (1979) Empty Sounds From Anarchy Ranch
- (1985) Fun In The U.K (Compilation)
- (1990) Live In Germany ’79 (Live)
- (1997) Chatham's Burning – Live 77 & 78 Demos (Compilation)

=== with The Milkshakes ===
LPs

- (1981) Talking ’Bout... Milkshakes
- (1982) Fourteen Rhythm & Beat Greats
- (1983) After School Session
- (1983) The Milkshakes IV – The Men With The Golden Guitars
- (1984) 20 Rock & Roll Hits Of The 50s & 60s
- (1984) In Germany
- (1984) Nothing Can Stop These Men
- (1984) They Came, They Saw, They Conquered
- (1984) Thee Milkshakes vs. The Prisoners
- (1987) The Milkshakes' Revenge – The Legendary Missing 9th Album

Compilations

- (1984) Showcase
- (1990) 19th Nervous Shakedown

=== with Thee Milkshakes ===
LPs

- (1984) Thee Knights of Trashe
- (1992) Still Talking ’Bout... Milkshakes!

=== with Thee Mighty Caesars ===
LPs

- (1985) Thee Mighty Caesars
- (1985) Beware the Ides of the March
- (1986) Thee Caesars of Trash
- (1987) Acropolis Now
- (1987) Wiseblood
- (1987) Live in Rome [studio recordings with overdubbed 'live' effects]
- (1987) Don’t Give Any Dinner to Henry Chinaski (1987) [demos]
- (1989) John Lennon’s Corpse Revisited
- (1992) Caesars Remains (demos etc)

Compilations

- (1987) Punk Rock Showcase
- (1989) Thusly, thee Mighty Caesars (English Punk Rock Explosion) (LP Comp U.S.)
- (1989) Surely They Were the Sons of God (C.D. Comp U.S.)
- (1994)Caesars Pleasure (CD Comp)

=== with The Delmonas ===
- Dangerous Charms (1985)
- The Delmonas 5 (1986)
- Do the Uncle Willy (1988)
- The Delmonas (1989)

=== as Wild Billy Childish & the Blackhands ===
- Play: Capt'n Calypso's Hoodoo Party (1988)
- The Original Chatham Jack (1992)
- Live in the Netherlands (1993)

=== as Jack Ketch & the Crowmen ===
- Brimful of Hate (1988) as Jack Ketch & the Crowmen

=== as Thee Headcoats ===
- Headcoats Down! (1989)
- The Earls of Suavedom (1990)
- Beach Bums Must Die (1990)
- The Kids Are All Square – This Is Hip! (1990)
- Heavens To Murgatroyd, Even! It's Thee Headcoats! (Already) (1990)
- W.O.A.H! Bo in Thee Garage (1991)
- Headcoatitude (1991)
- The Wurst Is Yet To Come (1993)
- The Good Times Are Killing Me (1993)
- Cavern By The Sea (1993)
- Conundrum (1994)
- The Sound Of The Baskervilles (1995 – Thee Headcoats featuring Thee Headcoatees)
- In Tweed We Trust (1996)
- Knights Of The Baskervilles (1996)
- The Jimmy Reid Experience (1997)
- The Messerschmit Pilot's Severed Hand (1998)
- Sherlock Holmes Meets The Punkenstien Monster (1998 Japanese Compilation)
- Brother Is Dead… But Fly Is Gone! (1998)
- 17% Hendrix Was Not The Only Musician (1998) Billy Childish & His Famous Headcoats
- The English Gentlemen Of Rock ’n’ Roll/The Best Vol.2 (1999) (Japanese Compilation)
- I Am The Object Of Your Desire (2000)
- Elementary Headcoats – Thee Singles 1990–1999 (2000 – compilation)
- Live At The Dirty Water Club (2021)
- Irregularis (The Great Hiatus) (2023)
- The Sherlock Holmes Rhythm ’n’ Beat Vernacular (2025)

=== as Thee Headcoats Sect (with The Downliners Sect) ===
- Deerstalking Men (1996)
- Ready Sect Go! (2000)

=== as The Buff Medways ===
- This is This (2001)
- Steady the Buffs (2002)
- The XFM Sessions (2003)
- 1914 (2003)
- Medway Wheelers (2005)

=== as The Chatham Singers ===
- Heavens Journey (2005)
- Juju Claudius (2009)
- Kings of the Medway Delta (2020)

=== as The Musicians of the British Empire ===
- Punk Rock at the British Legion Hall (2007)
- Christmas 1979 (2007)
- Thatcher's Children (2008)

=== as The Vermin Poets ===
- Poets of England (2010)

=== as The Spartan Dreggs ===
- Forensic R & B (2011)
- Dreggredation (2012)
- Coastal Command (2012)
- Tablets of Linear B (2012)
- Archeopteryx vs. Coelacanth (2014)
- A Tribute To A. E. Housman (2013 – CTMF & The Spartan Dreggs)

=== with CTMF ===
- All Our Forts Are With You (2013)
- Die Hinterstoisser Traverse (2013)
- Acorn Man (2014)
- SQ1 (2016)
- Brand New Cage (2017)
- In The Devil's Focus (10" BBC 6 Music Sessions) (2017)
- Brand New Cage (2017)
- Last Punk Standing... (2019)
- Brave Protector (ltd ed) (2019)
- Where The Wild Purple Iris Grows (2021)
- Failure Not Success (2023)

=== as The William Loveday Intention ===
- People Think they Know Me But They Don't Know Me (2020)
- Will There Ever Be A Day That You're Hung Like A Thief? (2020)
- The New Improved Bob Dylan (2020)
- Set of 8 lathe cut 7″ singles released by L-13 and Hangman Records (2020)
- The Bearded Lady Also Sells the Candy Floss (2021)
- Blud Under The Bridge (2021)
- The New Improved Bob Dylan, Vol 2 (2022)
- Where The Black Water Slid (2022)
- Cowboys Are SQ (2022)
- The New Improved Bob Dylan, Vol 3 (2022)
- They Wanted The Devil But I Sang Of God (2022)
- The Baptiser (2022)
- Paralysed By The Mountains (2022)

== Various artist compilations ==
- Time's Up Live (2001)
- The Smoking Dog Presents An Evening of Medway Blues (2005) (contributes three a cappella tracks "The Bitter Cup", "Black Girl" and "Out on the Western Plains")
- Children of Nuggets (2005) (two songs included by Mickey and the Milkshakes – "It's You" and "Please Don't Tell My Baby")

== Books ==
=== Selected fanzines and early written works ===
- Chathams Burning (1977)
- Bostik Haze (1978)
- Fab 69 (1978)
- The Kray Twins Summer Special (1978)
- The Arts and General Interest (1978)
- Hack Hack (1978)
- Goat Gruff (1979)
- Book of Nursary Rhimes (1979)
- Kinda Garten (1980)
- The Cuckoo's Cukoo (1980)
- Mertz in Chatham (1980)
- Shed Country (1980)
- The Cheesy Bug Gazet – with Sexton Ming (1980)
- Bo-Pug – The Six Tails – with Sexton Ming (1980)
- Mussel Horse in Holland – with Sexton Ming (1980)
- Dog Jaw Woman(1981)

=== Poetry ===
- Back on Red Lite Rd (1981)
- 2 Minits walk from 10am (1981)
- The First Creacher is Jellosey (1981)
- Black Things Hidden in Dust (1982)
- You Me Blud N Knuckle (1982)
- Big Cunt (1982)
- Prity Thing (1982)
- 7 by Childish (1982)
- Will the Circle be Unbroken (1983)
- 10 No Good Poems of Slavery, Buggery, Boredom and Disrespect (1983)
- Noting Can Stop This Man (1983)
- The Unknown Stuff (1983)
- Poems from the Barrier Block (1984)
- Tear Life to Pieces (1985)
- Poems Without Rhyme, Without Reason, Without Spelling, Without Words, Without Nothing (1985)
- Monks Without God (1986)
- Companions in a Death Boat (1987)
- To the Quick (1988)
- The Girl in the Tree (1988)
- Maverick Verse (1988)
- Admissions to Strangers (1989)
- En Carne Viva (1989) Spanish/English
- Death of a Wood (1989)
- The Deathly Flight of Angels (1990)
- Like a God i Love all Things (1991)
- The Hart Rises (1992)
- Trembling of Life (1993)
- Poems of Laughter and Violence -Selected Poems 1981–1986 (1993)
- Hunger at the Moon (1993)
- Days with a Hart Like a Dog (1994)
- Poems to Break the Harts of Impossible Princesses (1994)
- Big Hart and Balls (1995)
- This Puerile Thing (1996)
- In 5 Minits You'll Know Me -Selected Poems 1985–1995 (1996)
- A Terrible Hunger for Love (1997) Unpublished poems 1982–84
- "I'd Rather You Lied" Selected Poems 1980–1998 (1999)
- Chatham Town Welcomes Desperate Men (2000)
- Evidence Against Myself (2003)
- The Boss of All English Riters (2003)
- Calling Things by Their Proper Names (2003)
- Knite of the Sad Face (2004) Chap Book
- The 1st Green Horse God has Ever Made (2004)
- The Man with Gallows Eyes – Selected Poetry 1980–2005 (2005)
- The River be My Blud: Medway Poems (1980-05)
- This is My Shit and it Smells Good to Me (2008)
- Old 4 Legs (2008)
- Where the Tiger Prowls Stripped and Unseen (2008)
- Gods Fantasic Colours (2008) – Hand stamped covers. Note: some copies appear with different titles and
  different author and publisher: 'Art War, Man Taken from Guts' and 'Insolunce in the Face of Art' being examples.
- Unknowable but Certain (2009)
- Paraffin Van (2011) (Also published under the title "I Fuckt Frida Kahlo" as a Faber and Faber lookalike.)
- the sudden wren or painting lessons for poets and other mediochur cunts (2013)
- In the Teeth of Deamons (2015)
- 1 of the rist (2016)
- The Uncorrected (2018
- If you fly with the crows... Selected Poetry 2015 – 2019 (2019)
- Vipers Tongue Press Poetry Pamphlets (2020) – includes '100 yds of crash barrier' (Pamphlet 001), 'Cancer of the gallows' (Pamphlet 002), 'Poems nobody wants' (Pamphlet 003)

=== Fiction ===
- Conversations with Dr X (1987)
- Cannon-fodder, by Louis-Ferdinand Céline. Trans. K. De Coninck and Billy Childish (1988)
- The Silence of Words (1989)
- 9 Stories of the River Medway Recounted in the Language of Idiots for People of Little Discernment (2005)

=== Novels ===
- My Fault (1996)
- Notebooks of a Naked Youth (1997)
- Sex Crimes of the Futcher (2004)
- the idiocy of idears (2007)
- Bombs, Buggery and Buddhism or Diaries of a Mock Human (Part one) (2010)
- The Stonemason (2011)
- The Ward Porter (2015)
- The Student - a novella in 13 parts (2021-2022)

=== Lyrics ===
- Child's Death Letter (1990)
- Gun in My Fathers Hand: Selected Lyrics 1977–2006 (2006)

=== Art ===
- Hendrix was Not the Only Musician (1998)
- Paintings of a Backwater Visionary (2005)
- Thoughts of a Hangman – Woodcuts (2006)
- Field Trip Kraków/Auschwitz (2008) – under Guy Hamper
- Field Trip High Atlas/Marrakech (2008) – under Guy Hamper
- i am their damaged megaphone (2010) – neugerriemschneider, Berlin
- Field Trip Dockyard/Estuary Dreck (2010) – under Guy Hamper
- Love the Art Hate (2010) – L-13 London
- The soft ashes of Berlin snowing on Hans Falladas nose (2010) – neugerriemschneider, Berlin
- Frozen Estuary and Other Paintings of the Divine Ordinary (2012) – No.1 Smithery, The Historic Dockyard Chatham
- Billy Childish (3 Volume Catalogue Set in Slipcase – details 3 exhibitions at International Art Objects Galleries, Los Angeles, Lehmann Maupin, New York and neugerriemschneider, Berlin) – co-published & distributed by all 3 galleries and Koenig Books
- walking in god's buti: selected paintings 2013–2014
- unbegreiflich aber gewiss – Complete Catalogue of Paintings 2014–2017 (2017)
- skulls wolfs nudes rope pullers and a nervous breakdown – neugerriemschneider, Berlin (2020)

=== Critical ===
- Billy Childish: A Short Study; By Neal Brown (2008)
- Levity and Mystery: an introduction to the films of Billy Childish by Neil Palmer in No Focus: Punk on Film (Headpress, 2006)

=== Photography ===
- Photo Booth (2003)
- Dark Chamber- Pinhole Photography from the IGPP – contributor - (2007)
- Dark Chamber 2 – Pinhole Photography from the IGPP- contributor - (2008)
- Billy Childish Photography 1974 – 2020 (2020)

=== Selected films ===
- The Man With Wheels (1980)
- Quiet Lives (1983)
- Cheated (1993)
- The Flying Mustache (2002)
- Shooting at the Moon (2003)
- Brass Monkey (2004)
- Billy Childish Is Dead (2005)
- Wild Billy Childish & CTMF Live in Margate DVD Box Set (L-13, 2019)

== See also ==
- Medway groups
- Punk literature
- Collective, a BBC website Childish contributes to
- Billy Childish has been a regular contributor to Mineshaft magazine from 2003 to the present with his work appearing in issues 10, 13, 14, 18, 20 (front cover art), 28, 31, 33, 34, and 35.
