= Peter Smith =

Peter Smith may refer to:

== Arts and entertainment ==
- Peter Smith (oboist), American oboist with the Philadelphia Orchestra
- Peter Smith (painter) (born 1967), British painter
- Peter C. Smith (born 1940), British author of aeronautical, naval and military history books
- Peter Moore Smith (born 1965), American writer
- Peter Purves Smith (1912–1949), Australian artist
- Peter Smith (born c. 1978), member of the British boyband Phixx

== Politicians ==
- Peter Smith (Canadian politician) (1877–1934), Canadian politician involved in the Ontario Bond Scandal
- Peter Smith (South African politician) (born 1954), member of the National Assembly of South Africa
- Peter Smith (diplomat) (born 1942), governor of the Cayman Islands, 1999–2002
- Peter Smith, Baron Smith of Leigh (1945–2021), leader of Wigan council and member of the House of Lords
- Peter J. Smith (politician) (1867–1947), Wisconsin state senator
- Peter Plympton Smith (born 1945), lieutenant-governor and congressman from Vermont, president of California State University, Monterey Bay

== Sports ==
=== Association football (soccer) ===
- Peter Smith (English footballer, born 1935) (1935–2019), English footballer (Gillingham)
- Peter Smith (English footballer, born 1969), English footballer (Brighton & Hove Albion)
- Peter Smith (English footballer, born 1980), English footballer (Exeter City)
- Peter Smith (English footballer, born 1985), English footballer (Hong Kong Football Club)
- Peter Smith (Scottish footballer) (born 1937), Scottish footballer
- Peter Smith (Welsh footballer) (born 1978), retired Welsh professional footballer

=== Cricket ===
- Peter Smith (Australian cricketer) (born 1968), Australian cricketer
- Peter Smith (English cricketer, born 1908) (1908–1967), English cricketer
- Peter Smith (English cricketer, born 1934), English cricketer
- Peter Smith (English cricketer, born 1944) (1944–2024), English cricketer
- Peter Smith (New Zealand cricketer) (1935–2013), New Zealand cricketer

=== Other sports ===
- Peter Smith (curler) (born 1964), Scottish curler
- Peter Smith (Australian footballer, born 1960), Australian rules footballer at North Melbourne and Brisbane
- Peter Smith (ice hockey) (born 1953), head coach of the Canadian national women's hockey team
- Peter Smith (rugby league, born 1955), rugby league international for Great Britain and England
- Peter Smith (rugby league, born 1958), Australian rugby league player
- Peter Smith (rugby union) (1924–1954), New Zealand rugby player
- Peter V. Smith (born 1947), Australian rules footballer and son of Norm Smith
- Peter Smith (hurler) (born 1972), Irish hurling manager and former player
- Peter Smith (field hockey) (1926–2022), British field hockey player

== Scientists and engineers ==
- Peter Smith (biologist), professor at the University of Aberdeen
- Peter Smith (epidemiologist) (born 1942), professor of tropical epidemiology
- Peter Smith (computer scientist) (1956–2025), emeritus professor at the University of Sunderland
- Peter Smith (physicist) (born 1947), American physicist, principal investigator for the Phoenix spacecraft Mars mission
- Peter K. Smith (born 1943), British professor of psychology

== Other ==
- Peter Smith (bishop) (1943–2020), Roman Catholic Archbishop of Southwark (formerly the Archbishop of Cardiff)
- Peter Smith (American businessman) (born c. 1989), American businessman, co-founder of Blockchain.com
- Peter Smith (British businessman) (born 1946), English businessman, currently chairman of estate agents Savills
- Peter Smith (historian), British historian specializing in Bahá'í studies
- Peter Smith (judge) (born 1952), judge of the High Court of England and Wales
- Peter Smith (trade unionist) (1940–2006), general secretary of the British trade union, the Association of Teachers and Lecturers
- Peter H. Smith (born 1940), former president of the Latin American Studies Association
- Peter J. Smith, United States Attorney for the United States District Court for the Middle District of Pennsylvania, 2010–2016
- Peter Leslie Smith (born 1958), South African–born American Catholic bishop
- Peter W. Smith (1936–2017), American investment banker and Republican activist
- Peter J. Smith (attorney) (born 1940), American attorney
- Peter Smith (architectural historian) (1926–2013)

== See also ==
- Pete Smith (disambiguation)
- Peter Smyth (disambiguation)
- Peter Smythe (disambiguation)
