= The Users =

The Users may refer to:

- The Users (band), a punk rock band from the 1970s
- The Users (film), a 1978 television film starring Jaclyn Smith and Tony Curtis
