= Wat Tyler (band) =

English punk/novelty band

- Origin: England
- Genres: Punk
- Years active: 1986 - 2002
- Labels: Lookout! Records; Meantime Records; Rugger Bugger; Allied recordings; Damaged Goods
- Past members: Sean; Smithy; Tuck

Wat Tyler were an English punk/novelty band of the late 1980s and 1990s, fronted by Sean Forbes alongside Simon Tucker and Smithy. The band were known for their eclectic style, political commentary, surreal humour, and inside jokes, and produced a number of EPs and albums on different labels, including their own Rugger Bugger imprint and Lookout! Records.

Wat Tyler evolved from early 1980s anarcho-punk band 4 Minute Warning, and were performing gigs by 1986. Debut EP Contemporary Farming Issues was released in 1989 and included "Hops and Barley", later covered by and a live favourite for Leatherface. In 1993 their Madonna-parodying EP "Sexless" was made single of the week in NME and Kerrang! as well as giving the band national press exposure and a top ten UK Indie Chart hit.

1995's Tummy compilation was also released on Lookout! Records (US) and Gap Recordings (Netherlands). Its title and cover parodied Portishead's Dummy. Final album proper The Fat of the Band did the same for The Prodigy's 1997 album. Wat Tyler released their last record in 2002.

Forbes had earlier formed The Phantom Pregnancies with Karen Hill (Huggy Bear) and Delia Sparrow (Mambo Taxi); they released several singles and an album between 1994 and 1996. Forbes also formed mock Oi! band Hard Skin around this time, along with Ben Corrigan of Thatcher on Acid, and (initially) Chris Acland of Lush, and their debut 1996 album was followed by a second in 2004 and an acclaimed two-album release in 2013. Forbes curated compilation albums for Rough Trade Records, including Post Punk 01 (2003) and Indiepop (2004) and found internet fame as Record Shop Dude in 2012 with a series of videos for Vice magazine's Noisey.com YouTube channel.

== Selected discography ==
- I'm Forever Blowing Bubbles (1992), CD [compilation of early releases]
- Tummy (1995), CD [compilation]
- The Fat of the Band (1999), CD
- Ability Stinks (2000), 5xLP [Limited edition career-spanning compilation inc. 4 Minute Warning material]
