= Mission Accomplished ... But the Beat Goes On =

Live album by the Rezillos
- Released: 1979
- Recorded: 23 December 1978
- Venues: The Apollo, Glasgow
- Label: Sire

The Rezillos chronology
| Can't Stand the Rezillos (1978) | Mission Accomplished ... But the Beat Goes On (1979) | Can't Stand The Rezillos: The (Almost) Complete Rezillos (1993) |

Mission Accomplished ... But the Beat Goes On is a live album by the Scottish band the Rezillos, released in 1979. It peaked at No. 30 in the UK Albums Chart. "Cold Wars" was released as a single. The band toured in support of the 45th anniversary of the album.

== Production ==
The album was recorded on 23 December 1978, at The Apollo, in Glasgow. The Rezillos were contractually obligated to deliver it to Sire Records. Alastair Donaldson had already quit the band, but returned for the live date to play saxophone. The album contains six songs not found on the Rezillos' studio album. Bandmembers Fay Fife and Eugene Reynolds were unhappy with the band's performance. "Somebody's Gonna Get Their Head Kicked In Tonight" is a version of the Jeremy Spencer song. "Ballroom Blitz" is a cover of the Sweet song. "I Need You" is a cover of the Kinks song.

== Critical reception ==
Professional ratings
Review scores
| Source | Rating |
|---|---|
| All Music Guide to Rock | 3/5 stars |
| The Encyclopedia of Popular Music | 2/5 stars |
| The Great Indie Discography | 5/10 |
| Smash Hits | 8/10 |

The Telegraph and Argus called "Cold Wars" "a really good power pop single". The Cambridge Evening News labeled the album "lively", but noted that the band "needed to be seen to be fully appreciated." The Harrow Observer said that Mission Accomplished "conveys all the frantic energy, the colour and the exuberance of the live act." The Scunthorpe Evening Telegraph praised the "high energy" and "classy, polished" performance. The Evening Post opined that the album "tends to get boring after five or six tracks".

== Track listing ==
Reel one

1. "Introduction: Thunderbirds Theme / Top of the Pops"
2. "Mystery Action"
3. "Somebody's Gonna Get Their Head Kicked In Tonight"
4. "Thunderbirds Are Go / Thunderbirds Theme"
5. "Cold Wars"
6. "Teenbeat"
7. "No"

Reel two

1. "Land of a Thousand Dances"
2. "I Need You"
3. "Getting Me Down"
4. "Culture Shocked"
5. "Ballroom Blitz"
6. "(My Baby Does) Good Sculptures"
7. "Destination Venus"
