= CALinnovates =

California Innovates
- Type: Non-Profit
- Founded: 2010
- Founder: Lane Kasselman
- Headquarters: San Francisco, California, United States
- Area served: California, United States
- Website: www.calinnovates.org

CALinnovates is a membership-based organization, including AT&T and Uber, that advances pro-telecom and pro-contractor-work positions at the federal and state level, including social media campaigns opposing net neutrality. While the group does not disclose its funding sources, AT&T paid the group $100,000 for lobbying in California while the legislature debated a net neutrality bill, which CalInnovates and AT&T oppose.

It was founded in 2010 and is based in San Francisco, California. The organization's founder Lane Kasselman left shortly after founding the group to take a public relations job at AT&T.
