= 1937 in the United Kingdom =

Events from the year 1937 in the United Kingdom.

The coronation of King George VI took place on 12 May, after he had ascended to the throne at the end of the previous year.

== Incumbents ==
- Monarch – George VI
- Prime Minister - Stanley Baldwin (Coalition) (until 28 May), Neville Chamberlain (Coalition) (starting 28 May)

== Events ==
- 1 January – safety glass in vehicle windscreens becomes mandatory in the United Kingdom.
- 25 February – UK première of the historical film Fire Over England, providing the first pairing of Laurence Olivier and Vivien Leigh.
- 8 March – Prince Edward, the former King Edward VIII, is created Duke of Windsor.
- 19 March – Regency Act 1937 provides for the minority, incapacity or absence abroad of any future monarch.
- 12 April – Frank Whittle ground-tests the world's first jet engine designed to power an aircraft, at Rugby.
- 27 April – National Maritime Museum opened at Greenwich in former Royal Hospital School premises.
- April – the Royal Mint introduces the twelve-sided nickel-brass threepence coin, superseding the earlier round silver coin.
- May – the Georgian Group is set up as part of the Society for the Protection of Ancient Buildings in England.
- 1–27 May – London's bus drivers and conductors go on strike.
- 12 May – Coronation of George VI and Elizabeth takes place at Westminster Abbey, London. The BBC makes its first television outside broadcast covering the event. The newly formed social research organisation Mass Observation makes its first survey of social attitudes on this day.
- 23 May – nearly 4000 Basque (and other) child refugees of the Spanish Civil War arrive at Southampton.
- 27 May – George VI passes letters patent denying the style of Royal Highness to the wife and descendants of the Duke of Windsor.
- 28 May – Neville Chamberlain becomes Prime Minister after Baldwin's retirement.
- 3 June – the Duke of Windsor marries Wallis Simpson in the Château de Candé.
- 1 July
  - Ministers of the Crown Act 1937 for the first time formally recognises the offices of Prime Minister, the Cabinet and the Leader of the Opposition and provides them with official salaries (in addition to their stipends as MPs).
  - The 999 emergency telephone number is introduced.
- 2 July – Holditch Colliery Disaster, a coal mining accident in Chesterton, Staffordshire, in which thirty men die following a fire and explosions.
- 6 July – Littlewoods, the pools company formed fourteen years ago by Liverpool businessman John Moores, expands to create a department store in Blackpool, Lancashire.
- 7 July – Peel Commission proposes partition of the British Mandate of Palestine into separate Arab and Jewish states.
- 23 July – Matrimonial Causes Act adds insanity and desertion to infidelity as legitimate grounds for divorce.
- 28 July – assassination attempt on King George VI in Belfast by the Irish Republican Army.
- 4 August – return of the British Graham Land Expedition from Antarctica.
- 27 August – Benjamin Britten's string orchestral work Variations on a Theme of Frank Bridge, Op. 10, receives its concert première at the Salzburg Festival, bringing the composer to international attention.
- 7 September – Witley Court in Worcestershire is gutted by fire.
- 30 September – last issue of The Morning Post newspaper before it is absorbed by The Daily Telegraph.
- October–December – Croydon typhoid outbreak of 1937: 341 cases of typhoid fever (43 fatal) result from a polluted well.
- 6 October – the fictional character 'Mrs. Miniver' first appears in the column on domestic life written by 'Jan Struther' for The Times.
- 16 October – Jimmy McGrory plays his last match with Celtic F.C., achieving a United Kingdom record of 550 goals scored during his senior career.
- 4 December – the first issue of children's comic The Dandy, including the character Desperate Dan, is published.
- 10 December
  - Nobel Prizes announced:
    - Lord Robert Cecil wins the Nobel Peace Prize.
    - George Thomson wins the Nobel Prize in Physics jointly with Clinton Davisson "for their experimental discovery of the diffraction of electrons by crystals".
    - Walter Haworth wins half of the Nobel Prize in Chemistry "for his investigations on carbohydrates and vitamin C".
  - Castlecary rail crash: an express on the Edinburgh to Glasgow line collides into the rear of a local train standing at Castlecary in the snow, due primarily to a signalman's error; 35 are killed.
- 16 December – the musical Me and My Girl opens in the West End Victoria Palace Theatre; the dance number "The Lambeth Walk" becomes popular.
- December – The Hawker Hurricane enters service with the Royal Air Force as its first monoplane fighter aircraft (with No. 111 Squadron at Northolt).
- Undated
  - The sugar-coated chocolate sweets Smarties are first marketed under this name by Rowntree's of York.
  - Kensal House in Ladbroke Grove, London, two low-rise blocks of modernist flats for the working class designed by Maxwell Fry, is completed as a prototype for modern urban living.

== Publications ==
- 21 May – Penguin Books launches its Pelican Books sixpenny paperback non-fiction imprint with a 2-volume edition of Bernard Shaw's The Intelligent Woman's Guide to Socialism and Capitalism.
- Agatha Christie's Hercule Poirot novels Dumb Witness and Death on the Nile.
- A. J. Cronin's medical novel The Citadel.
- C. S. Forester's first Horatio Hornblower novel The Happy Return.
- David Jones' World War I epic In Parenthesis.
- George Orwell's social reportage and political polemic The Road to Wigan Pier.
- J. R. R. Tolkien's children's fantasy novel The Hobbit.

== Births ==
- 1 January
  - Anne Aubrey, actress
  - John Fuller, poet and author
- 2 January – Terence Rigby, actor (died 2008)
- 7 January – Ian La Frenais, English screenwriter and producer
- 8 January – Shirley Bassey, Welsh-born singer
- 9 January
  - Malcolm Cecil, jazz bassist and record producer (died 2021)
  - Michael Nicholson, journalist and author (died 2016)
- 14 January – Ken Higgs, English cricketer (died 2016)
- 18 January – John Hume, Northern Irish SDLP politician, recipient of the Nobel Peace Prize (died 2020)
- 19 January – Ian Samwell, rock guitarist, singer-songwriter and record producer (died 2003)
- 21 January – Ursula Owen, editor and publisher
- 27 January – John Ogdon, pianist (died 1989)
- 29 January – Jeff Clyne, jazz bassist (died 2009)
- 30 January – Vanessa Redgrave, actress
- 7 February – Peter Jay, economist, broadcaster and diplomat (died 2024)
- 10 February – Anne Anderson, Scottish physiologist (died 1983)
- 11 February – Ian Gow, Member of Parliament for Eastbourne (assassinated by the IRA 1990)
- 12 February – Roland Boyes, Labour politician (died 2006)
- 16 February – Peter Hobday, radio presenter and journalist (died 2020)
- 17 February
  - Peter Beet, general practitioner and railway preservationist (died 2005)
  - Benjamin Whitrow, actor (died 2017)
- 21 February – Jilly Cooper, novelist (died 2025)
- 25 February – Tom Courtenay, actor
- 16 March – Ben Aris, actor (died 2003)
- 22 March – Foo Foo Lammar, drag queen (died 2004)
- 24 March – Benjamin Luxon, baritone (died 2024)
- 6 April
  - Angus Grossart, businessman (died 2022)
  - Terrence Hardiman, actor (died 2023)
- 9 April
  - Barrington J. Bayley, science fiction author (died 2008)
  - Valerie Singleton, television presenter
- 10 April – Stan Mellor, National Hunt jockey and trainer (died 2020)
- 11 April - Jill Gascoine, actress (died 2020)
- 12 April – Edward Hide, jockey (died 2023)
- 13 April – Edward Fox, actor
- 18 April
  - Jan Kaplický, Czech-born British architect (died 2009)
  - Teddy Taylor, politician (died 2017)
- 29 April – Jill Paton Walsh, novelist (died 2020)
- 30 April – Tony Harrison, poet and playwright (died 2025)
- 1 May
  - Tamsyn Imison, illustrator and educator (died 2017)
  - Una Stubbs, actress (died 2021)
- 5 May – Delia Derbyshire, electronic music composer (died 2001)
- 6 May – Paul Stephenson, civil rights campaigner (died 2024)
- 12 May
  - Beryl Burton, racing cyclist (died 1996)
  - Susan Hampshire, actress
  - Miriam Stoppard, doctor and writer
- 13 May
  - Trevor Baylis, inventor of the wind-up radio (died 2018)
  - John Cope, Baron Cope of Berkeley, accountant and politician, Treasurer of the Household
- 19 May – Pat Roach, wrestler and actor (died 2004)
- 22 May – Charles Beare, luthier and violin expert (died 2025)
- 26 May – Neil Ardley, composer (died 2004)
- 2 June – Rosalyn Higgins, born Rosalyn C. Cohen, President of the International Court of Justice
- 3 June – Valerie Masterson, opera singer
- 8 June – Gillian Clarke, Welsh poet and playwright
- 15 June – Alan Thornett, Trotskyist activist
- 16 June – Charmian May, actress (died 2002)
- 21 June
  - John Edrich, cricketer (died 2020)
  - Averil Mansfield, surgeon
- 23 June – Sir Nicholas Shackleton, geologist (died 2006)
- 26 June – Len Worley, English footballer
- 2 July – Dee Palmer, born David Palmer, composer, arranger and progressive rock keyboardist
- 3 July
  - Brian Garvey, English footballer (died 2026)
  - Tom Stoppard, Czech-born playwright (died 2025)
- 4 June – Richard Robson, English-born chemist, recipient of the Nobel Prize in Chemistry
- 9 July – David Hockney, artist (died 2026)
- 13 July – Ghillean Prance, botanist and ecologist
- 14 July
  - David Lytton Cobbold, 2nd Baron Cobbold, aristocrat and rock festival promoter (died 2022)
  - Duncan MacKay, Scottish footballer (died 2019)
- 16 July
  - Tommy Bruce, singer (died 2006)
  - Jeremy Spenser, actor
- 17 July – Alan Hopper, English footballer
- 18 July – Peter Smith, Scottish footballer
- 21 July – Neville Bannister, footballer
- 22 July – Jon Price, cricketer
- 25 July – Colin Renfrew, archaeologist (died 2024)
- 27 July – Anna Dawson, actress
- 2 August – Jim McLean, football player and manager (died 2020)
- 3 August – Steven Berkoff, actor and writer
- 4 August – Dave Pearson, painter (died 2008)
- 5 August – Alan Howard, actor (died 2015)
- 6 August – Barbara Windsor, actress (died 2020)
- 18 August
  - Willie Rushton, comedian, actor and writer (died 1996)
  - Peter Usborne, publisher (died 2023)
- 19 August – Richard Ingrams, journalist and editor
- 20 August – Jim Bowen, born Peter Williams, stand-up comedian and television host (died 2018)
- 21 August – Donald Dewar, First Minister of Scotland (died 2000)
- 28 August – Ian Campbell, 12th Duke of Argyll, peer (died 2001)
- 1 September – Allen Jones, pop artist
- 2 September
  - John Cornforth, architectural historian (died 2004)
  - Derek Fowlds, actor (died 2020)
- 5 September – Dick Clement, screenwriter
- 7 September – Clive Everton, sports commentator (died 2024)
- 13 September – Jessica Mann, crime novelist (died 2018)
- 16 September – Keith Bosley, broadcaster, poet and translator (died 2018)
- 20 September – Geoffrey Dear, Baron Dear, police officer
- 27 September – Valerie Gearon, actress (died 2003)
- 1 October – Matthew Carter, type designer
- 4 October – Jackie Collins, romance novelist (died 2015 in the United States)
- 7 October – Christopher Booker, journalist (died 2019)
- 9 October – Brian Blessed, actor
- 11 October – Bobby Charlton, England footballer (died 2023)
- 17 October – Paxton Whitehead, English actor (died 2023 in the United States)
- 24 October – Barry Davies, English journalist and sportscaster
- 3 November – Christopher Leaver, businessman and lord mayor of London
- 8 November – Paul Foot, journalist (died 2004)
- 9 November – Roger McGough, Liverpool poet
- 15 November – Ron Yeats, Scottish footballer (died 2024)
- 16 November – Alan Budd, economist and academic (died 2023)
- 17 November – Peter Cook, comedian and writer (died 1995)
- 19 November – Penelope Leach, psychologist
- 23 November – Geoffrey Hinsliff, actor (died 2024)
- 27 November – Rodney Bewes, television actor (died 2017)
- 28 November – Matisyahu Salomon, English-born American rabbi (died 2024 in the United States)
- 30 November
  - Frank Ifield, yodelling singer (died 2024 in Australia)
  - Ridley Scott, film director
- 7 December – Kenneth Colley, actor (died 2025)
- 10 December – Scott Baker, lawyer and judge
- 18 December – Anne Wood, children's television producer
- 20 December – Paddy McNally, businessman and racing driver (died 2026)
- 21 December – Jimmy Collins, Scottish footballer (died 2018)
- 22 December – Charlotte Lamb, novelist (died 2000)
- 26 December – John Horton Conway, mathematician (died 2020 in the United States)
- 29 December – Barbara Steele, actress
- 30 December – Gordon Banks, English goalkeeper (died 2019)
- 31 December – Anthony Hopkins, Welsh actor

== Deaths ==
- 5 January – Marie Booth, third daughter of William and Catherine Booth (born 1864)
- 10 January – Bertie Crewe, theatre architect (born 1860)
- 18 January – Isaac Barr, Anglican clergyman, promoter of colonial settlement schemes (born 1847)
- 28 January – Dame Agnes Jekyll, artist, writer on domestic matters and philanthropist (born 1861)
- 19 February – Edward Garnett, critic (born 1868)
- 20 February – Sir Percy Cox, army general and colonial administrator (born 1864)
- 27 February – Douglas Carnegie, politician (born 1870)
- 13 March – Elihu Thomson, engineer and inventor in the United States (born 1853)
- 16 March – Sir Austen Chamberlain, statesman, recipient of the Nobel Peace Prize (born 1863)
- 20 March – Harry Vardon, golf professional (born 1870)
- 22 March
  - Alfred Dyke Acland, military officer (born 1858)
  - Mary Russell, Duchess of Bedford, aviator, ornithologist, in plane crash (born 1865)
- 25 March – John Drinkwater, poet and dramatist (born 1882)
- 8 April
  - Billy Bassett, footballer (born 1869)
  - Sir William Henry Hadow, educationalist (born 1859)
- 19 April – Martin Conway, 1st Baron Conway of Allington, art critic, politician and mountaineer (born 1856)
- 24 April – Lucy Beaumont, actress (born 1869)
- 10 May – Sir James Blindell, politician (born 1884)
- 12 May
  - Sir Henry Birchenough, businessman and public servant (born 1853)
  - Cecil Meares, explorer (born 1877)
- 15 May – Philip Snowden, 1st Viscount Snowden, politician, Chancellor of the Exchequer (born 1864)
- 5 June – Owen Philipps, 1st Baron Kylsant, shipowner
- 11 June – R. J. Mitchell, aeronautical engineer (born 1895)
- 19 June – J. M. Barrie, novelist and dramatist (born 1860)
- 22 June – Sir Eric Geddes, transport manager and politician (born 1875)
- 12 July – Hugo Charteris, 11th Earl of Wemyss, politician, public servant (born 1857)
- 17 July – Percy Gardner, archaeologist (born 1846)
- 18 July – Julian Bell, poet, killed in Spanish Civil War (born 1908)
- 14 August – H. C. McNeile (Sapper), novelist and soldier (born 1888)
- 22 August – Albert Goodman, politician (born 1880)
- 24 August – Gervase Beckett, politician (born 1866)
- 31 August – Ruth Baldwin, socialite (born 1905)
- 6 September – Harry Charles Purvis Bell, civil servant, commissioner (born 1851)
- 15 September – Clifford Heatherley, actor (born 1888)
- 16 October – William Sealy Gosset, statistician (born 1876)
- 17 October – J. Bruce Ismay, shipowner (born 1862)
- 30 October – Sir Herbert Maxwell, Scottish novelist, essayist, artist, antiquarian, horticulturalist and Conservative politician (born 1845)
- 4 November – William Bennett, politician (born 1873)
- 6 November – Johnston Forbes-Robertson, stage actor (born 1853)
- 9 November – Ramsay MacDonald, Prime Minister of the United Kingdom (born 1866)
- 25 November – Lilian Baylis, theatrical producer (born 1874)
- 9 December — Lilias Armstrong, phonetician (born 1882)
- 14 December - Lord Edward Gleichen, army officer (born 1863)
- 22 December – Joseph Darby, spring jumper (born 1861)
- 26 December
  - Ivor Gurney, war poet and composer, of tuberculosis (born 1890)
  - Mittie Frances Clarke Point, American novelist (born 1850)
- 27 December – Sir Coote Hedley, army officer and sportsman (born 1865)
- 28 December – Herbert Bullmore, Scottish Rugby Union international (born 1874)

== See also ==
- List of British films of 1937
