= Hard Skin =

English punk band

- Origin: Gipsy Hill, London
- Genres: Oi!; punk rock
- Years active: 1996–2025
- Spinoff of: Wat Tyler; Thatcher On Acid
- Members: Fat Bob (Sean Forbes); Johnny Takeaway (Ben Corrigan); Nipper (Scott Stewart)
- Past members: Nosher (Chris Acland)

Hard Skin were an English punk group from Gipsy Hill, London who played in the early UK Oi! style.

== History ==
Hard Skin were an oi band founded in 1996 and their first album Hard Nuts and Hard Cunts appeared that year. The band were: bassist "Fat Bob" (Sean Forbes of Wat Tyler), guitarist and lead vocalist "Johnny Takeaway" (Ben Corrigan of Thatcher on Acid) and drummer "Nosher" (Chris Acland of indie/Britpop band Lush). After Acland's death, he was replaced on drums by "Nipper" (Scott Stewart) for second album Same Meat Different Gravy in 2005, which like its predecessor was received positively in punk and Oi! circles despite (or perhaps partly because of) the band's parodic tendencies.

Third album proper On The Balls was released in 2013, alongside companion album Why Do Birds Suddenly Appear featuring alternate versions of its songs voiced by female vocalists, including Joanna Newsom, Manda Rin, Miki Berenyi, Beth Jeans Houghton, Debbie Smith, Alela Diane, Alison Mosshart, Beki Bondage, Marion Herbain, Roxanne Clifford, and Liela Moss. The album also featured an appearance by Gaye Advert.

In 2025 they announced their final gigs would take place in December of that year.

== Selected Discography ==
=== Albums ===
- Hard Nuts and Hard Cunts, Helen of Oi!, 1996
- Same Meat Different Gravy, Household Name Records, 2005
- On the Balls, JT Classics, 2013
- Why Do Birds Suddenly Appear, JT Classics, 2013
- Do You Like Hospital Food EP, JT Classics, 2014
- South East Enders EP, JT Classics, 2020

=== Singles/EPs ===
- You Won't Get Better Than This, 2024

=== Compilations and live ===
- Live & Loud & Skinhead, Damaged Goods Records, 2002
- Greatest Hits Vol. 5, 2007
- Where the Fuckin Mic – live at the Grosvenor 2005, Fat Punks Records (HSKIN01), 2009
- We're the Fucking George, JT Classics, 2011
- We're the Fucking Business, JT Classics, 2015
- Greatest Hits Vol. 7, 2016
- We're the Fucking Mustard, JT Classics, 2018
- Gold, JT Classics, 2024
