= Can't Stand the Rezillos =

Studio album by the Rezillos
- Released: 21 July 1978
- Recorded: February 1978
- Studio: Power Station (New York City)
- Genre: New wave; punk rock; power pop
- Length: 32:06
- Label: Sire
- Producer: Bob Clearmountain; Tony Bongiovi; Lance Quinn; The Rezillos

The Rezillos chronology
| Can't Stand the Rezillos (1978) | Mission Accomplished ... But the Beat Goes On (1979) |

Singles from Can't Stand the Rezillos
- 1. "Can't Stand My Baby" Released: 19 August 1977; 2. "(My Baby Does) Good Sculptures" Released: 2 December 1977; 3. "Top of the Pops" Released: 21 July 1978

Can't Stand the Rezillos is the debut studio album by the Edinburgh-based punk band the Rezillos, released on 21 July 1978 by Sire Records. The album has a more mainstream pop and rock and roll sound than the punk music of the time, and includes the UK top twenty hit "Top of the Pops", as well as several cover versions of 1960s songs: "Glad All Over" (originally a hit for the Dave Clark Five); "Somebody's Gonna Get Their Head Kicked In Tonight" (originally by Fleetwood Mac); and "I Like It", a Gerry and the Pacemakers hit.

Can't Stand the Rezillos received positive reviews from the UK music magazines and reached number 16 on the UK Albums Chart. The Rezillos split four months after the album's release, and the band did not make another studio album until their reformation in 2001 and the release of Zero in 2015, but Can't Stand the Rezillos has continued to receive critical acclaim since its release.

== Recording ==
The band released their debut single "Can't Stand My Baby" in August 1977 on the independent Edinburgh-based record label Sensible Records. Towards the end of 1977 the band's energetic live shows were gaining the attention of the music press and several major record labels. The group eventually signed with New York-based Sire Records which at that point was regarded as the major label most sympathetic to the emerging punk and new wave music scene, having already signed the Ramones and Talking Heads. The band's second single, "(My Baby Does) Good Sculptures", which was originally also scheduled to be released on Sensible Records, was released in December on Sire instead.

Sire suggested to the Rezillos that they record the album in New York City, to which the band readily agreed, eager to travel outside the UK. The album was recorded during February 1978 at producer Tony Bongiovi's studio the Power Station, with Bongiovi and his assistant Lance Quinn originally scheduled to handle production duties. However, due to illness Bongiovi was unable to attend the majority of the recording sessions, and in his absence his engineer Bob Clearmountain ended up overseeing most of the album: the band recognised Clearmountain's contribution to the record and pressed for his name to be included on the production credits.

== Release ==
Although mixing for the album was completed in March, its release was delayed for several months while Sire waited for its distribution deal with Phonogram Records to run out and to be able to switch to Warner Bros. Records. The Rezillos were angry with the lengthy delay, feeling that they were losing momentum and twice having to cancel a planned tour, and bass player William Mysterious quit the band in frustration. Can't Stand the Rezillos was eventually released in July 1978. A third single, "Top of the Pops" was released to coincide with the album and became the band's biggest hit. The single was a re-recorded version of the album track, featuring new bass player Simon Templar.

In 1993 the album was reissued on CD in a remastered and expanded version titled Can't Stand the Rezillos: The (Almost) Complete Rezillos. This 28-track version comprised the original thirteen-track album, the group's November 1978 single "Destination Venus" and its B-side "Mystery Action", and the 1979 live album Mission Accomplished... But the Beat Goes On. The final track of Mission Accomplished..., a live version of "Destination Venus", had to be dropped due to time constraints on the CD.

== Critical reception ==
Professional ratings
Review scores
| Source | Rating |
|---|---|
| AllMusic | 4.5/5 stars |
| Q | 4/5 stars |
| Record Mirror | 3/5 stars |
| Sounds | 4/5 stars |
| Uncut | 8/10 |
| The Village Voice | B |

The reviews from the UK music press upon the album's release were very favourable. The NME's Paul Morley described the album as "13 quick cuts lustily shot through with cheap culture combinations ... The group's inventiveness does things with noise that are a little too clever for hippy-happy exhilaration; there's no chance of any calculated innocence here ... But it's all very clever: the parodied dissatisfaction of punk; the lashings of beat and controlled chaos; the frenzied passion of the production, and, above all else, lots of cosmic vibes, maan." Ian Birch of Melody Maker said, "There's no need for worried glances: the band have pulled the proverbial cat out of the bag. They have always been about wraparound, cartoon strip enjoyment and that's exactly what you get. Both sides seethe with great pop bluster which has been captured (as it should have been) in all its rough-edged immediacy." Nick Tester of Sounds stated that the album was "a definitive slice of the Scottish beat combo's past and present in full unabridged glory... No flabby excesses, the Rezillos stick 'wisely' to their ultra confident and rigid style, a format which sweeps through both sides with little hesitation or respite." The one reserved review came from Record Mirror, where despite her enthusiasm for the Rezillos' live act, Sheila Prophet felt that on record "they retain all their crazed energy and off-the-wall humour, but it's pretty much just one joke, and that tends to wear thin after a while ... Really, the problem facing the Rezillos is the same one facing any group who choose humour and parody as their medium: what sounds amusing on first hearing can quickly degenerate into being simply a disposable novelty."

AllMusic enthused over the "hyperactive tempos, raging guitar, abbreviated pop melodies, goofy and slightly off-kilter lyrics that display a fascination with junk culture and '60s pop... the real key to this album is its simple, good-hearted joie de vivre; funny-punk was rarely executed with the degree of skill, finesse, and pure delirious glee as the Rezillos summoned up on Can't Stand the Rezillos. It makes me smile more than any U.K. punk album ever made me, and it has the greatest Dave Clark Five cover ever committed to tape – what greater recommendation could you ask for? A triumph." Trouser Press called the band "a blast of fresh air compared to the more serious bands of new wave's first charge" and praised the album as "an action-packed document of their pop/camp approach".

=== Accolades ===
In 1994, All Time Top 1000 Albums named Can't Stand the Rezillos one of the 50 best punk albums of all time. The compilers stated that the Rezillos were "exuberant almost to the point of hysteria", creating "a body of work full of verve, style and humour", which this album "encapsulates to perfection". Punk aficionados acclaimed the album. In March 2003, Mojo magazine ranked the LP in its list of the Top 50 Punk Albums.

== Track listing ==
All tracks written and composed by John Callis except where indicated.

Side one

1. "Flying Saucer Attack" – 2:47
2. "No" – 2:22
3. "Somebody's Gonna Get Their Head Kicked in Tonight" (Jeremy Spencer) – 1:53
4. "Top of the Pops" – 2:55
5. "2000 A.D." (Callis, Mysterious) – 2:58
6. "It Gets Me" (Mysterious) – 2:11
7. "Can't Stand My Baby" – 2:22

Side two

1. "Glad All Over" (Dave Clark, Mike Smith) – 2:07
2. "(My Baby Does) Good Sculptures" – 3:10
3. "I Like It" (Mitch Murray) – 1:46
4. "Getting Me Down" – 2:06
5. "Cold Wars" – 2:54
6. "Bad Guy Reaction" – 2:15

=== Can't Stand The Rezillos: The (Almost) Complete Rezillos ===
1. "Flying Saucer Attack" – 2:50
2. "No" – 2:22
3. "Somebody's Gonna Get Their Head Kicked In Tonight" (Jeremy Spencer) – 1:54
4. "Top of the Pops" – 2:55
5. "2000 A.D." (Callis, Mysterious) – 2:59
6. "It Gets Me" (Mysterious) – 2:11
7. "Can't Stand My Baby" – 2:23
8. "Glad All Over" (Dave Clark, Mike Smith) – 2:07
9. "(My Baby Does) Good Sculptures" – 3:11
10. "I Like It" (Mitch Murray) – 1:46
11. "Getting Me Down" – 2:07
12. "Cold Wars" – 2:55
13. "Bad Guy Reaction" – 2:16
14. "Destination Venus" (non-album single, November 1978) – 3:35
15. "Mystery Action" (B-side of "Destination Venus") – 2:46

Live tracks (originally from Mission Accomplished... But the Beat Goes On):

16. "Top of the Pops" – 2:54
17. "Mystery Action" – 2:46
18. "Somebody's Gonna Get Their Head Kicked In Tonight" (Jeremy Spencer) – 1:48
19. "Thunderbirds Are Go" – 2:31
20. "Cold Wars" – 2:56
21. "Teenbeat" – 3:08
22. "No" – 2:15
23. "Land of a Thousand Dances" (Chris Kenner, Fats Domino) – 2:14
24. "I Need You" (Ray Davies) – 1:49
25. "Culture Shock" – 3:11
26. "Getting Me Down" – 2:01
27. "Ballroom Blitz" (Mike Chapman, Nicky Chinn) – 4:47
28. "(My Baby Does) Good Sculptures" – 3:20
- Note: on all versions of the album "I Like It" is incorrectly credited to Calvin Scott, Clarence Carter and Felix Thomas.

== Musicians ==
- Jo Callis – electric guitars
- Mysterious (aka William Mysterious) – bass on tracks 1–13, saxophone on tracks 16–28
- Angel Paterson – drums
- Fay Fife – vocals
- Eugene Reynolds – vocals

Additional personnel

- Simon Templar – bass on tracks 14–28
- Gail Warning – backing vocals on tracks 16–28

== Release history ==
| Region | Date | Label | Format | Catalog |
|---|---|---|---|---|
| United Kingdom | 21 July 1978 | Sire Records | LP | K 56530 |
| United Kingdom | 21 July 1978 | Sire Records | cassette | K 456530 |
| United States & Europe | 21 July 1978 | Sire Records | LP | SRK 6057 |
| Worldwide | 23 March 1993 | Sire Records | compact disc | 7599-26942-2 |
