= Piney Gir =

American musician

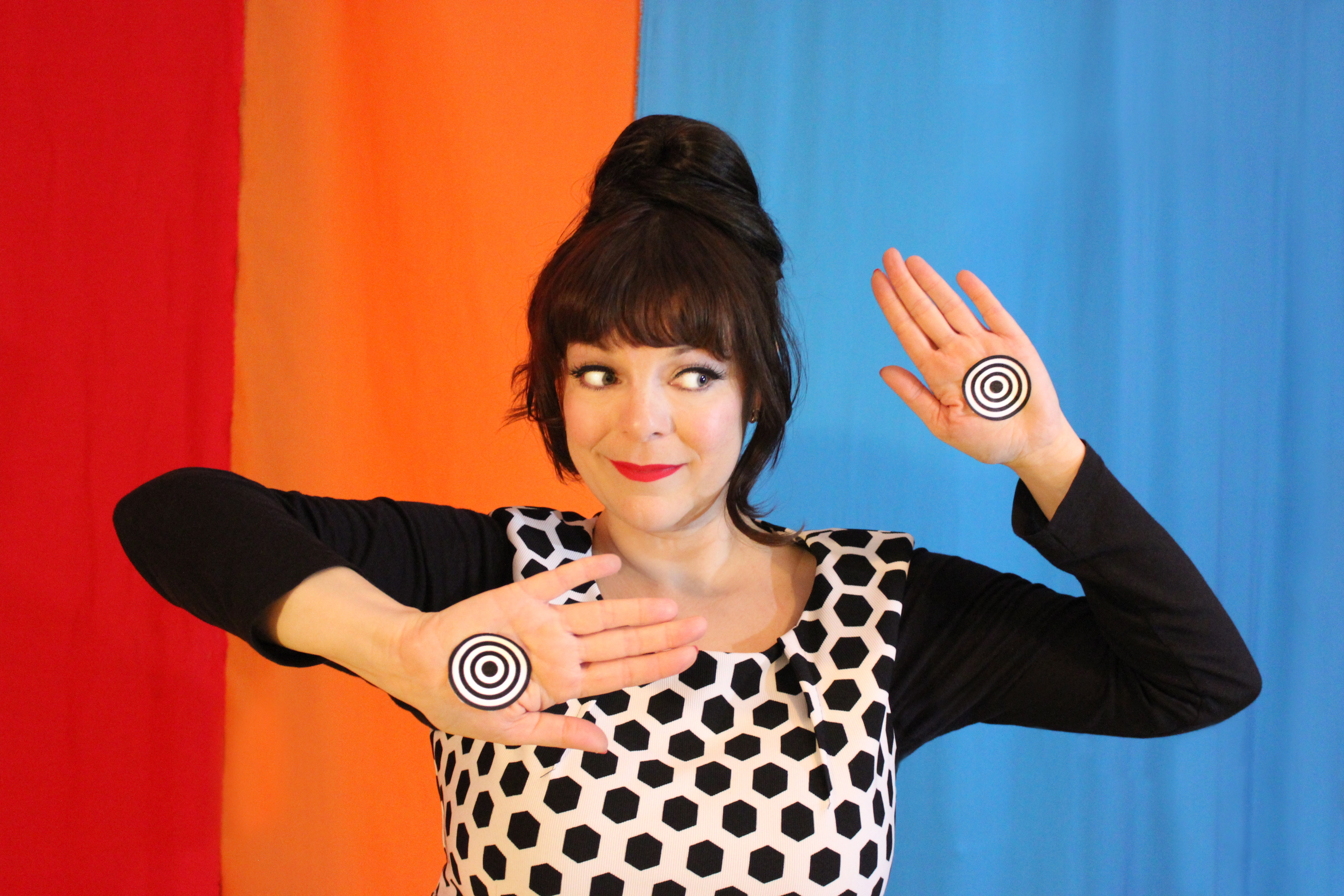
- Piney Gir, 2015

Background information
- Born: Angela Dawne Penhaligon
- Origin: Kansas City, United States
- Genres: Electronic, psychedelic, indie, Americana, rock, indie pop
- Years active: 2003—present
- Labels: Truck Records, Greyday Records, Hotel Records, Highline Records, Damaged Goods Records,
- Members: Garo Nahoulakian, Nick 'Growler' Fowler, Mike Monaghan, Tom Greenhalf, Mike Smith, Harry Deacon, Emma Brammer, Amy Ashworth
- Past members: Barny Rockford, Alex Mayor, Sarah Williams, Joe Smith, Ian Kellett, Dave Howell, Simon Byrt, Dave Fisher, Alex Gold, Jamie Lockhart, Leo Whetter, A Scholar and a Physician, Steve Dawson, Oli Horton, Ash Verjee, Anne-Marie Gilkes, Andrew 'Mitch' Mitchell
- Website: Official Site

Piney Gir (pronounced "gear"), often shortened to Piney, is an American musician and singer, born in Kansas but based in London, England since 1998. She has released seven studio albums.

Piney's musical style is predominately edgy indie-pop, although she has been described both as a musical "chameleon" and as "the indie Dolly Parton" and "Transatlantic Pop Guru".

Piney was raised in the Bible Belt of Midwest America and was sheltered from most secular music and culture growing up. She took piano lessons from the age of four and sang every week in church. As a teenager, Piney rebelled against this upbringing embracing all types of music, which may later explain her ability to write and create all genres of music. She then went to UMKC Conservatory of Music and Dance where she majored in music, firstly playing drums and pitched percussion, but then changing her major to voice. When she moved to London, she went to Central Saint Martins and took some night classes while doing temp jobs by day; working in bars and clubs at night, she then joined synth pop duo Vic Twenty. Vic Twenty released a single on Mute records sub label Credible Sexy Units and toured the UK and Europe with Erasure. It was at Truck Festival that Truck Records saw Piney play the Trailer Park Stage and offered her a record deal in 2003, the start of her prolific career as a solo artist.

== Musical career ==
Piney is an established figure on the London music scene, and has toured the UK, Europe and America extensively. Among others, she has supported Gaz Coombes, Ride, Erasure, Wanda Jackson, The Hidden Cameras and The Research and she's played many festivals around the UK, US and Europe including appearances at Glastonbury festival on the Park Stage and South by Southwest. She has collaborated with many successful artists, including Andy Ramsay of Stereolab; Rob Campanella from The Brian Jonestown Massacre, Eamon Hamilton from the band Brakes and British Sea Power; Sweet Baboo, Willie J Healey, Angela Correa of Correatown, The Real Tuesday Weld, and Simple Kid.

Piney sings in Gaz Coombes's band and is a singer with Noel Gallagher. She has also sung with Garth Hudson from The Band and regularly sings with Dream Themes and Ralfe Band (both live and on their records). She also sang on the Corona Virus themed Disco album "Stayin' Alive" with Rhodri Marsden. Piney is a backing singer on Danny Goffey's forthcoming solo album as well as singing on Lawrence's new Mozart Estate album, Tower Block In A Jam Jar.

== Discography ==
=== Peakahokahoo ===
Released on Truck Records (2004).

The album is electronica in style, and features Simple Kid. The album was extensively toured, including a slot supporting Erasure on a month-long European tour, and a session for Mark Radcliffe on BBC Radio 2.

==== Singles from Peakahokahoo ====
- Janet Schmanet/Kissing/Sweet (2004) Truck Records
- Creature/Ruth Is Coming to America/Jingle De Lo Marcelo Crivella (2004) Truck Records
- Greetings, Salutations, Goodbye (2004) Truck Records

=== Hold Yer Horses ===
Released on Truck Records (2006).

Whilst touring Peakahokahoo, Piney was offered a support slot at a working men's club with an Americana band and decided to try playing country versions of her songs. This led to the formation of The Piney Gir Country Roadshow, and the release of Hold Yer Horses. The album was selected as one of the top five of 2006 by Phill Jupitus in the 5 December issue of Radio Times magazine, saying, "the stomp and twang of these songs of love and life are unmissable".

==== Singles from Hold Yer Horses ====
- Great Divide (2006) Truck Records
- I Don't Know Why I Feel Like Crying But I Do (2006) Truck Records
- Greetings, Salutations, Goodbye - Country Roadshow Version (2007) Truck Records

=== The Yearling ===
Released on Hotel Records (2009).

After releasing the electro-quirk album Peakahokahoo and alt-country album Hold Yer Horses, Piney married the two styles together to create folktronic fusion album The Yearling, which combines the twang and heartbreak of country music with eclectic beats, lo-fi synths and found sounds. Album track and single, Of All The Wonderful Things, features Eamon Hamilton from Brakes and British Sea Power. Album track Miss Havisham features in the film You're Not You starring Hilary Swank. The album secured radio sessions with Mark Radcliffe, Marc Riley and Cerys Matthews on BBC Radio 6 Music. Piney toured the UK extensively with The Yearling: she supported The Hidden Cameras on a UK tour as well as supporting The Research on a UK tour, played SXSW Festival in Austin Texas and Slottsfjell Festival in Norway.

==== Singles from The Yearling ====
- Of All The Wonderful Things/My Imaginary Baby (2009) Purr Records
- Say I'm Sorry (2009) Hotel Records
- Weeping Bee (2009) Hotel Records
- For The Love of Others (2009) Damaged Goods

=== Jesus Wept ===
Released on Damaged Goods (2010).

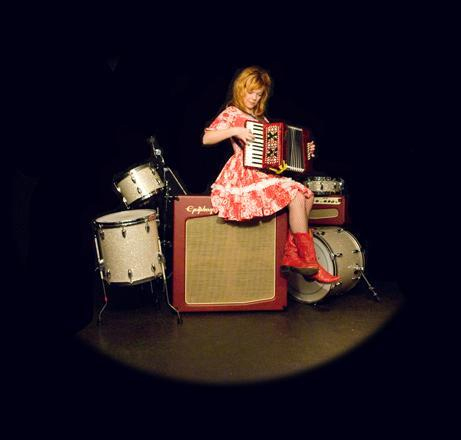
Piney Gir in Country Roadshow mode

The second Piney Gir Country Roadshow album evolves from the classic, old-fashioned Nashville Sound of Hold Yer Horses into a more Laurel Canyon, country-rock style with a modern twist. A lot of this album was written on tour by Piney with the Roadshow in the back of the tour van and in various venue dressing rooms. Half of the album captures a sunny California vibe, while the other half has a dark murder ballad edge to it. Jesus Wept was recorded at Bark Studio in Walthamstow with Brian O'Shaunghessy known for his work with Primal Scream, Denim and My Bloody Valentine. The album features collaborations with members of Danny and the Champions of the World and Fionn Regan's band. The Piney Gir Country Roadshow toured the UK extensively to promote the album and Piney played SXSW festival, as well as the UK festival circuit. Single, 40 Days 'n' Nights, was used in Italian indie film Some Say No directed by Giambattista Avellino.

==== Singles from Jesus Wept ====
- 40 Days 'n' Nights (2010) Damaged Goods. B-side After The Flood is a remix of 40 Days 'n' Nights by Simon Bookish and there is a cover of Bob Dylan's Forever Young
- Lucky Me (2011) Damaged Goods. Features a cover of Billy Idol's White Wedding as a B-side that was used in a Peugeot advert.

=== Geronimo! ===
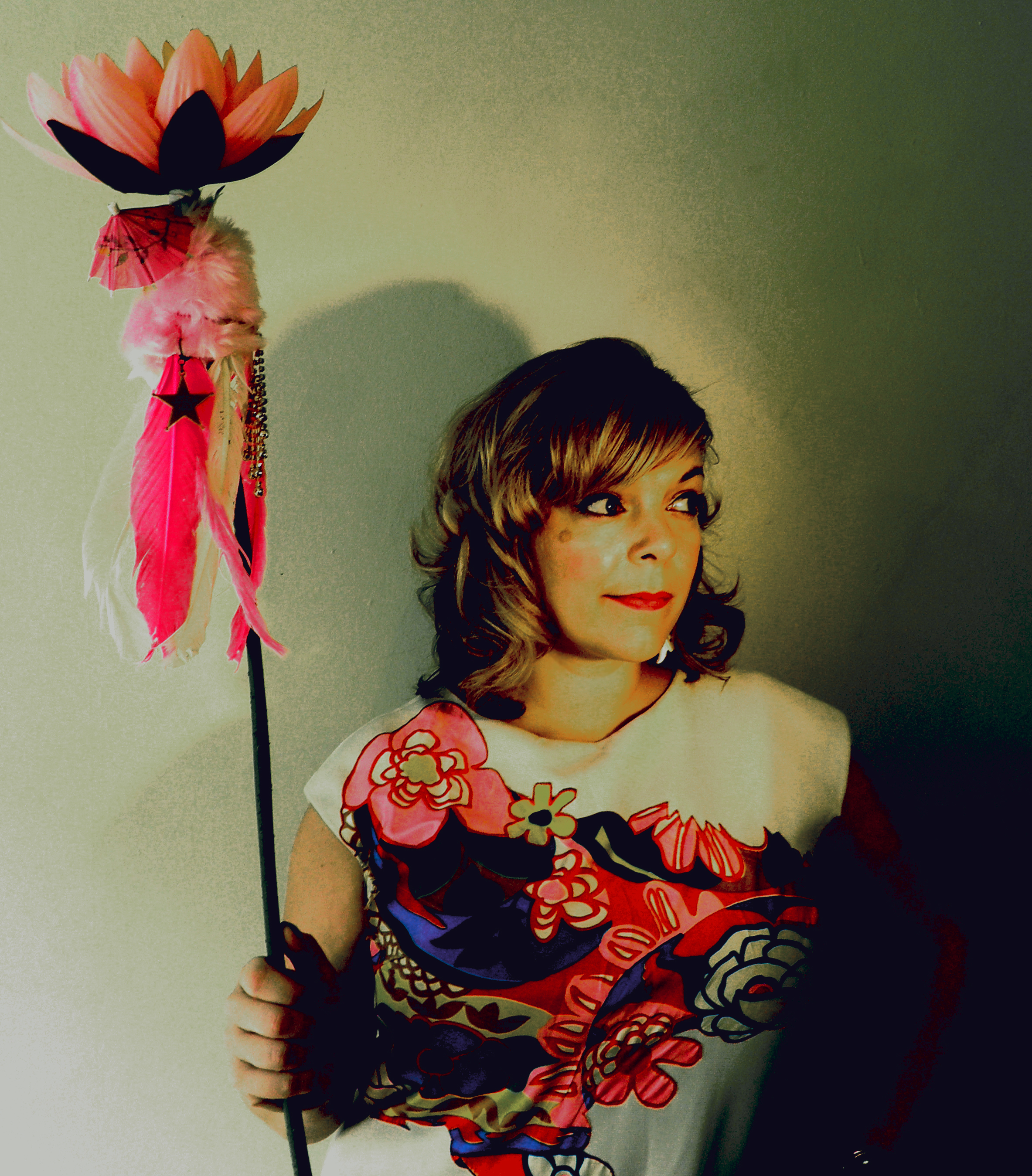
Different hair, same Piney Gir

Released on Damaged Goods (UK) & Highline Records (USA) (2011).

Geronimo! was recorded in early 2011 in Los Angeles with Brian Jonestown Massacre's Rob Campanella. Garo Nahoulakian was lead guitarist, arranger, and co-producer of the album. Nelson Bragg (percussionist for The Beach Boys and Brian Wilson) played percussion on most songs on the album. Brass was played by Tom Bennellick who also played on The Beatles Sergeant Pepper album and Oxford-based jazz musician Lloyd Payne.

The album was recorded almost completely live over six days. It has a reverb-drenched, analogue, 1960s sound.

Piney toured the UK and also America for the first time playing CMJ Festival as well as dates on the East Coast, West Coast and Chicago. She did an interview on NPR's Weekend Edition and played NPR's Mountain Stage in West Virginia alongside Will Oldham. She played Glastonbury Festival and was joined on stage by her former bandmates Georgina 'George' Terry and Katrin Geilhausen from all-female, art-rock band The Schla La Las.

Outta Site was playlisted at BBC 6 music and on Amazing Radio. It was supported by DJs including Lauren Laverne, Mark Radcliffe, Gideon Coe, and Simon Raymonde. Oh Lies was used on ABC 's Private Practice. Outta Site, Stay Sweet and Oh Lies were used on Misfits (E4), Made in Chelsea (E4), Being Human (BBC), Waterloo Road (BBC) and Switch (ITV).

==== Singles from Geronimo! ====
- Oh Lies (2011) Damaged Goods
- Outta Sight (2012) Damaged Goods
- Would You Be There (2012) Damaged Goods
- Stay Sweet (2012) Damaged Goods
- Longest Day of Spring (2012) Highline Records
- Friends and Neighbours (2012) Highline Records

=== mR. hYDE’S wILD rIDE ===
Released on Damaged Goods (UK) (2015) and Greyday (USA) (2016).

Piney's sixth studio album was partly recorded in Andy Ramsey (of Stereolab)'s studio and features Andy on drums for select tracks as well as members of Gaz Coombes's live band and Emiliana Torrini's band.

The album channels 60s beat pop with a touch of Kraut rock, which creates a retro-futuristic angle. There's a grungey riot grrl edge to it with growling, distorted guitars and there's a synthy edge to it too, using vintage space echo, marimba, omnichord and pocket piano; they combine to create euphoric shimmering indie to reinforce riff-led guitar pop.

==== Singles from mR. hYDE’S wILD rIDE ====
- Keep it Together (2015) Damaged Goods
- Gold Rules (2015) Damaged Goods
- Mouse of a Ghost/Tilt-A-Whirl (double A-side single) (2015) Damaged Goods

=== You Are Here ===
Released on STRS Records (2019).

You Are Here is Piney's 7th album and explores the spaces and spikes of angular art rock and pop inspired by Bowie's Berlin Trilogy, making heavy use of the Eventide effects box, which Tony Visconti said "f*cks with the fabric of time" and synths and sax reminiscent of Roxy Music. The themes are darker than usual for Piney, who, like many artists at this time, were disillusioned by Trump, Brexit, the #MeToo movement, the growing wealth gap on the rise, gentrification pushing people out of their homes; then Piney lost a close friend, and had some health scares of her own, it was a very dark time for her. "You Are Here" captures the collective experience of dealing with loss and adversity through her own personal lens. Recording the album was a jam session, as Piney and her bandmates created the music spontaneously in the studio, sometimes in only one take, she worked with members of Gaz Coombes' touring band Garo Nahoulakian, Mike Monaghan, Nick Fowler and Tomas Greenhalf, as well as Rusty Bradshaw who played with Florence and the Machine and Harry Deacon who plays with Palace, and Razorlight. Guest vocalists on the album includes Sweet Baboo who also played baritone saxophone and Willie J Healey guested on the single "Puppy Love." With additional production and mixing from Simon Byrt and Oli Horton from Dreamtrak.

==== Singles from You Are Here ====
- The Great Pretend (2018) STRS
- Dreamcatcher (2019) STRS
- Peanut Butter Malt Shop Heartthrob (2019) STRS
- Puppy Love featuring Willie J Healey (2020) STRS

=== Other releases ===
- "I'm Letting in the Sunshine" (2012) Wise Music - featured on the Sky series Hit and Miss
- "Me and Mr Wolf" with The Real Tuesday Weld (2012) Moon Setting - Crammed Discs
- "Ghost of the Year" with Correatown (2014) Sleep and Other Drugs - Another Room Recordings
- "My Halloween" (2013) Damaged Goods Records
- "Love Is a Christmas Rose" (2016) Wise Music

=== Compilations ===
- Greetings, Salutations, Goodbye - Blue Balearic (2004)
- K-I-S-S-I-N-G Little White Chapel Mix - A Catholic Education (2004) - Freedom Road Records
- Need Some Time (w/Trademark) - Truck Seven (2004) - Truck Records
- Jezabel - Roxy Soundwaves (2005) - Lanai Ltd
- Don't Say You Love Me - Erasure Remix (2005) - Mute Records
- Nightsong - Rob Da Bank presents Sunday Best (2005) - Sunday Best
- Hello Chanel - 20 Nights of Wine and Song (2005) - Grey Day
- Sugar - 50 Minutes (2006) Exercise1
- I Want To Touch You - Never Love That Feeling Vol 2 (2006) - Club AC30
- Hello Chanel, Electronic Bible 2 (2006) - White Label Music
- Say I'm Sorry - Slottsfjell (2008) - Slottsfjell Festival Productions
- Waiting on a Sunny Day - Play Some Pool, Skip Some School, Act Real Cool: A Global Pop Tribute to Bruce Springsteen (2009) - WIAIWYA
- Every Day's A Holiday – Festivus (2012) Highline - Featured on the E4 series Made in Chelsea
- It's Christmas - Festivus 2 (2013) - Highline Records
- Velvet Ears presents STRS featuring Piney Gir (2018)
- The Great Pretend - Joyzine 15 (2018)
- This Town Ain't Big Enough for Both of Us - Dream Themes featuring Piney Gir (2019) - ECC Records

== Radio ==
Piney has been a darling of the BBC over the years, having done multiple sessions for BBC 1, 2 and 6, for Mark Radcliffe, Mark Riley, Stuart Maconi, Cerys Matthews, Tom Robinson, Gideon Coe, Bob Harris, Rob Da Bank, Bethan Elfyn, Janice Long, Huw Stephens, and more... she has been playlisted on BBC 6 Music and was featured live and in session on John Kennedy's Radio X X-posure show as well as the Radio X SXSW special in 2007, she's also been playlisted at Amazing Radio. In the USA she has had support from KCRW, WXNA, KKFI and has made multiple appearances on NPR including Weekend Edition and Mountain Stage, sharing the bill with Calexico, Will Oldham and Bahamas. Piney currently hosts The Other Woman Show on Soho Radio, and was previously a radio presenter for Resonance FM and also hosted "The Doggone History of Country Music" for Radio Nowhere.

== Roxys ==
Piney is a member of a backing singer girl group called Roxys. Roxys includes Piney Gir, Amy Ashworth and Emma Brammer. The trio toured with Gaz Coombes to promote his album Worlds Strongest Man (released 2018) they also sing on his "Live in Paris" EP and his "Sheldonian Live" EP. They were christened Roxys by Nile Rogers backstage at Later... with Jools Holland where they met him after the show and he pointed at the girls one by one, calling them each Roxy, Roxy and Roxy. Roxys recently started singing with Noel Gallagher both in his touring band The High Flying Birds and on EPs "Blue Moon Rising" "This Is The Place" "Black Star Dancing" and on the single "Wandering Star".

== Collaborations ==
Piney Gir performing on the Park Stage with the Piney Gir Country Roadshow at Glastonbury 2007

Piney Gir is an artist who has collaborated with several talented and renowned musicians and has played in many bands. Piney Gir Country Roadshow (now defunct) comprised the country music incarnation of Piney Gir alongside four other players, Dave Howell, Dave Fisher, Simon Byrt and Ian Kellett. They formed when a promoter asked Piney to play a working men's club in London alongside an alt-country band. Piney didn't think her electro-chanteuse stylings would go down so well at the working men's club so she got some friends together to help her do covers of her debut album "Peakahokahoo" in a country style. This went down a treat and led to the formation of The Piney Gir Country Roadshow who recorded 2 albums and toured for 5 years.

Piney was a member of punk-rock girl band, The Schla La Las released by Truck Records, she was one half of the duo Fly By Pony released by Tummy Touch Records, Piney was the frontwoman of Kraftwerk-inspired synth quartet Funsize Lions, a founder member of recorder group The Zoltan Kodaly School For Girls who supported Ash and The Futureheads. She also founded the Orff Orchestra released by Guided Missile.

Piney got her start in synth pop duo Vic Twenty who toured with Erasure and released a single on CSU a subsidiary of Mute Records before going solo as Piney Gir.

She sang a duet with MC Lars called "Internet Relationships" produced by A Scholar and A Physician, and was a guest vocalist on the Dusty Sound System album featuring members of Goldrush; she also guested with Danny and the Champions of the World at their live shows from 2008 to 2010. Piney sang and co-wrote pop songs with Damon Minchella from Ocean Colour Scene and Steve White from Style Council and Paul Weller's band.

=== Other collaborations ===
- Me and Mr. Wolf with The Real Tuesday Weld. Featured on Songs for the Last Werewolf (2011) Universal.
- Ghost of the Year with LA singer-songwriter Correatown. Ghost of the Year was featured on ABC show, Grey's Anatomy.

== Other work ==
In addition to her musical career Piney Gir has also engaged in writing, art curation, and club promotion.

She currently writes a column for Oxford Mail which she started writing during the COVID-19 pandemic. In her column Piney Gir brings good news to her readers, interviewing local people who are getting on with doing positive things for their community and want to share their uplifting stories.

Piney has written a series of articles for The Huffington Post, including a tour diary of going to Tokyo with Gaz Coombes, the day she met David Bowie's hairdresser responsible for his iconic red hair and also the wardrobe designer for the film The Man Who Fell To Earth, and Hannah Peel's Memory Tapes project - a series of playlists designed to help combat symptoms of Alzheimers and Dementia.

Piney has written a cookbook 'zine called Drunk Cookery which was compiled to accompany an art exhibition that she curated called "The Full English" for We Built This City on Carnaby Street, Soho, London (2018) the exhibition featured food-inspired art, in the wake of Brexit the exhibition celebrated all things European highlighting how multicultural being 'Full English' can be, a subject close to Piney's heart as she's an immigrant herself, moving to the UK in 1998. The event also boasted interactive workshops about food sustainability and panel discussions about the food industry, including a drunk cookery demonstration from Piney Gir herself. She made Drunk Ramen in under 10 minutes with only a kettle and a recording of The Rolling Stones song Sympathy for the Devil.

Piney's first venture into art curation was in 2016 co-curating an event with food artist Alice Straker at the White Conduit Gallery in Islington, London, the exhibition was called "Violet's Gum" inspired by the iconic moment when character Violet Beauregarde chews the gum that tastes of a 3 course meal before turning into a blueberry, in Roald Dahl's children's book Charlie and the Chocolate Factory. The exhibition was launched in the wake of what would have been Roald Dahl's 100th birthday.

Club promotion has been something Piney's been involved with in London since 2005. Firstly promoting Wired Women, a series of monthly events with Anat Ben David from Chicks on Speed, Seb Emina and Fiona Wootton at the Spitz, a now defunct venue formerly housed in Spitalfields Market and funded by the Dandelion Trust, they created a series of monthly events. Creating a platform for female-fronted bands, musicians that are women, performance artists, lady DJs and other female-fronted talent. The events went on for almost 3 years before they hosted an all-day festival, taking over the whole of Spitalfields Market with an outdoor stage and workshops like radical cheerleading and teaching people how to play the Theremin. Wired Women then hosted a take-over of the Whitechapel Art Gallery as their swansong.

Piney curated a stage at Truck Festival 2007 & 2008. In 2007 she booked bands in the acoustic tent alongside crafting tables where festival goers could make a quilt square. The quilt was stitched together and auctioned off for Haven House charity. In 2008 Piney hosted the Piney Pavilion, booking bands like The Research, Let's Wrestle and Ye Nuns, an all-female tribute band paying homage to The Monks.

Piney then went on to host a monthly club night with actress and performance artist Ceri Ashcroft aka The Juggling Spinster called The Village Green Preservation Society inspired by the Kinks song of the same name. The club featured music, stand-up comedy, performance art, poetry and magicians; the night took place at The Betsey Trotwood pub in Clerkenwell from 2010 to 2013.

In 2019, Piney, Ceri Ashcroft and Garo Nahoulakian, toured a puppet show around UK libraries called "The Story of Piney Gir" with help from Serious Music, the LEAP music programme and the Paul Hamlyn Trust. The show was designed to encourage people to go to libraries more, it involved music and singing, storytelling and puppeteering. The concept stemmed from an audio book Piney put together several years earlier called "The Story of Piney Gir" it has musical themes for each character and different actors play the different roles in the story on the audio book, including Simon Bookish, Ali Shaw from the band Cranes, Louis Philippe, and A Scholar and a Physician. Written by Jenny Newman, illustrations by Katrin Geilhausen, layout by Lydia Merrills-Ashcroft the story was narrated by Mark Radcliffe the book is available through Hope and Plum Publishing.

== Film and TV ==
Piney Gir's music has appeared in the following TV shows and films:

=== TV ===
- Queer Eye
- The Circle
- The Grand Tour
- The Ranch
- Talking to the Dead
- What Remains
- Made in Chelsea
- Private Practice
- Misfits
- Being Human
- Waterloo Road
- Switch
- Peugeot (TV ad)
- Grey's Anatomy
- Hit & Miss
- Drifters

=== Film ===
- Daphne
- You're Not You
- Nina Forever
- An American Girl
- Grace Under Pressure
- Some Say No
