= Klaus Hommels =

German Venture capitalist

- Born: February 17, 1967
- Education: University of Fribourg
- Occupation: Venture capitalist
- Years active: 1990s-present
- Office: Spotify: Board of Directors; Apax Partners: Director; Benchmark Capital: Venture Partner; Hommels Holding; Founder of Lakestar
- Website: Team: Klaus Hommels

Klaus Hommels (born February 17, 1967) is a German venture capitalist. He focuses on early and growth-stage investments and has founded his own venture capital fund by the name of Lakestar, through which he has been investing mainly in digital businesses. He has been invested in Facebook, Skype and Xing; other examples are Klarna, HomeToGo, and Revolut.

== Early life and education ==
Hommels graduated with a Master of Science in Business Administration and a PhD in Finance from the University of Fribourg (Switzerland). After graduating, he started working for Bertelsmann as an Executive Assistant. He was Managing Director for AOL Germany from 1995 to 1999 in the areas of business development, content, and advertising. He then worked for the private equity firm Apax Partners in Munich as a director until 2000.

At the height of the Dot-com bubble, he began investing in technology startups as a private investor. During this time, he invested in numerous notable startups. These included companies like Facebook. After six years as a private investor, he moved to London in 2006 as a venture partner at Benchmark Capital (now Balderton Capital).

In 2019, Hommels advocated for a sovereign wealth fund in the EU, among other things.

== Investments ==
=== Hommels Holding ===
After a year with Benchmark, he founded Hommels Holding in 2007, resuming his private investing in technology and Internet-based businesses. In 2009, it was announced that Hommels had made an investment in the startup, Spotify. As part of the announcement, he also became a member of its board. He was an early-stage investor in the company, with a valuation of around £20-£30 million.

Hommels has invested in several major startups and also had many notable exits. Prior to Lakestar, Hommels was an early investor in many tech startups. One of his first major investments was in the German-social media startup, Xing. According to a Business Insider report, it was the first social media company to IPO globally. In 2007, Hommels exited his position with QXL.com, which was sold for £946 million. He also invested in Spotify in 2009. He also invested in Skype and exited the position when it was acquired by Microsoft in May 2011 for $8.5 billion.

=== Lakestar ===
Following these initial successes, Hommels founded Lakestar, a venture capital firm based in Zurich, in 2012. The company focused on early and growth stage investments, with a priority in B2B commerce, digitization and deep tech, fintech, games and media, healthcare, logistics, as well as travel and mobility. Besides the Zurich office, Lakestar has an international presence in Berlin and London.

Since 2012, Lakestar has developed a good brand name, however as performance of the funds become more clear, its reputation has been questioned. There has been several articles on Klaus Hommels on Handelsblatt. The venture capital firm's first fund decided to extend the fund life by a year in 2023. In 2013, Lakestar announced the launch of its first institutional fund, Lakestar I, with a total size of €150 million. Lakestar I subsequently invested in several European startups and participated in a $27 million funding round for Omio, formerly GoEuro, among other investments. In 2019, Lakestar's most recent fund raised $700 million. Other investments of Lakestar include Sennder, Glovo, GetYourGuide, for example.

In 2021, Hommels/Lakestar was the first European venture capital fund to sponsor a special purpose investment vehicle (SPAC) totaling $332 million.

== Other activities ==
- since 2016: Internet Economy Foundation (IE.F), Member of the Board
- since 2021: Munich Security Conference (MSC), Member of the Security Innovation Board
- 2021/2022: Vice-Chair and Chair-elect of Invest Europe, an industry association representing investment firms
- 2023-2025: Chair of the NATO Innovation Fund

Hommels is a member of the advisory and supervisory boards of various companies, including Revolut, Sennder and Isar Aerospace. He actively advocates for the digital sovereignty of Europe, supporting the Scale Up initiative of Emmanuel Macron, for example.

== Honors ==
In 2006, Hommels was named Europe's most successful entrepreneurial private investor by leading European business schools IESE, INSEAD, and the University of St. Gallen.

In 2017, Hommels ranked third by Forbes on its first-ever Midas Touch list. In 2019, Hommels was ranked 46th on the global Midas list and 5th on the European Midas list by Forbes. In 2021, he is ranked 6th on the European Top Tech Investors list and 31st on the global Top Tech Investors list. In 2022, Hommels was also on the Midas List, mentioning his investment in Revolut.
