= Long Kuan Jiu Duan =

Chinese musician duo

Long Kuan Jiu Duan (Chinese: 龙宽九段) were a Chinese electronic duo who experienced brief success 2002–2004 before disbanding in 2005. The duo consisted of female singer Long Kuan (龙宽) (formerly of the British-based pop-punk band Mika Bomb) and guitarist Jiu Duan (“九段” real name Tian Peng 田鹏).

== Discography ==
- Wo ting zhezhong yinyue de shihou zui ai ni 我听这种音乐的时候最爱你 CD
- Shijue luxing 视觉旅行 DVD
