= Blockchain.com =

Bitcoin wallet and cryptocurrency brokerage

- Industry: Cryptocurrency
- Founded: August 2011; 15 years ago in York, United Kingdom
- Founder: Peter Smith, Benjamin Reeves, Nicolas Cary
- Headquarters: London, England, United Kingdom
- Key people: Peter Smith (CEO); Lane Kasselman (Co-CEO); Jim Messina (Director)
- Products: Cryptocurrency wallet; cryptocurrency brokerage; blockchain explorer; lending; prediction markets
- Number of employees: 450
- Website: blockchain.com

Blockchain.com (formerly Blockchain.info) is a cryptocurrency financial services company. The company began as the first Bitcoin blockchain explorer in 2011 and later created a cryptocurrency wallet that accounted for 28% of bitcoin transactions between 2012 and 2020. It also operates a cryptocurrency brokerage and provides institutional markets lending business and data, charts, and analytics.

== Corporate affairs ==
Blockchain.com is a private company. The company is led by CEO Peter Smith, one of its three founders, and co-CEO Lane Kasselman. The company's board members include Smith, co-founder Nicolas Cary, Tom Horton, Jim Messina, Joseph Otting, Manuel Stotz, Nicolas Brand, Timothy P. Flynn, and Landon Edmond.

Between 2012 and February 2021, the company raised a total of $190 million in venture capital funding. In March 2021, it raised an additional $300 million investment. Investors in the company include partners of DST Global, Lightspeed Venture Partners, VY Capital, GV, Baillie Gifford, Lakestar, Eldridge, Kyle Bass, Access Industries, Moore Strategic Ventures and Rovida Advisors.

== History ==
=== Founding (2011-2014) ===
Blockchain.info was established by Ben Reeves in 2011. He launched a website which could be used to track bitcoin transactions. The website was a block explorer, a website that allowed bitcoin users to see the details of public cryptocurrency transactions if they have the identifying hash code for the transaction.

In early 2012, Reeves and Brian Armstrong, the co-founder of crypto-currency exchange Coinbase, applied to Y Combinator's summer class. They proposed a payment platform for bitcoin where users could keep a digital wallet, exchange other currencies for bitcoins for a percentage fee, and make payments in bitcoin. Due to different opinions they parted ways prior to attending Y Combinator. Reeves wanted to create a platform where users controlled access to their bitcoin information, while Armstrong felt that the platform should retain custody of the users wallets. After parting ways with Armstrong, Reeves continued to work on Blockchain.info.

From 2013 to 2014, Blockchain's user base grew from 100,000 wallet users in early 2013 to 1.5 million in April 2014. By 2014, Blockchain.com was the most popular bitcoin wallet and was led by Nicolas Cary as CEO. It had acquired two companies, ZeroBlock in 2013, and RTBTC in early 2014, through which it added data analytics services, and brought these services together under one umbrella. In December 2013, Blockchain.com acquired ZeroBlock, an app for bitcoin pricing. The following year, it acquired the data analytics platform RTBTC. It integrated RTBTC's technology with its existing services, establishing one platform offering cryptocurrency wallet, pricing and analytics, and the cryptocurrency explorer.

In February 2014, Apple Inc. removed the Blockchain.com app from the iOS App Store, prompting a public outcry in the bitcoin community, most notably within the Reddit community. At the time, it was the only bitcoin wallet app available for Apple users, as Apple had removed or denied other apps. In July 2014, Apple reinstated the Blockchain.com app.

=== Formal establishment, expansion (2014-2019) ===
In 2014, Peter Smith joined the founding team as its CEO. The three founders, Reeves, Cary and Smith, worked from Reeves' flat in York and formally established the company when bitcoin investor Roger Ver provided initial funding. By October 2014, it had 2.3 million consumer wallets and raised $30.5 million in its first external fundraising round, with investors including Lightspeed Venture Partners and Mosaic Ventures. This was the biggest round of financing in the digital currency sector at that time. The World Economic Forum named the company as one of 2016's "Technology Pioneers". In 2017, the company carried out a second round of fundraising. It closed $40 million in funding that June and the company was valued at $280 million.

In 2018, Blockchain started selling services for institutional cryptocurrency. In mid-2018, the company acquired Tsukemen, an app-development startup company based in San Francisco. In July 2019, Blockchain.com launched its cryptocurrency exchange and promoted it as faster than others.

=== International growth and Three Arrows Capital exposure (2020-2026) ===
In 2020, Blockchain.com had 31 million users and in September 2020, the company joined the Coalition for App Fairness which aims to negotiate for better conditions for the inclusion of apps in app stores. As of 2021, there were 65 million Blockchain.com wallets and 28% of bitcoin transactions since 2012 were initiated or received by a Blockchain.com wallet. In February 2021, Blockchain.com raised a $120 million funding round from investors including Moore Strategic Ventures, Kyle Bass, Access Industries, Rovida Advisors, Lightspeed Venture Partners, GV, Lakestar, and Eldridge. Including previous venture capital funding rounds, the company had raised $190 million altogether. One month later, the company announced a further $300 million fundraising round. One-third of the amount raised was funded by investment firm Baillie Gifford which invested $100 million. Based on the fundraising round, the company was valued at $5.2 billion.

In 2022, Blockchain.com's CEO wrote to shareholders informing them that Three Arrows Capital rapidly becoming insolvent meant a default of approximately $270 million worth of cryptocurrency and US dollar loans to Blockchain.com. The firm laid off 25% of its staff, about 150 people, on July 21. In that same year, Blockchain.com partnered with the Dallas Cowboys, which became the first NFL team to add a digital currency platform as a sponsor.

As of May 2023, Blockchain.com had over 31 million clients, with growth focused in countries such as Nigeria, Ghana, Colombia, Argentina, and Ukraine, according to the company's chief executive officer, Peter Smith. The company was also investing heavily in European countries and Singapore. In November of that same year, Blockchain.com raised $110 million in Series E funding led by Kingsway Capital. The round also included investments from Baillie Gifford, Lakestar, Lightspeed Venture Partners, and Coinbase Ventures. Ending the year, in December 2023, reports by Bloomberg indicated that Blockchain.com sought to expand into Nigeria and Turkey within the first quarter of 2024, and to expand its workforce by 25%. At that time, the company employed an estimated 300 people. Additionally, Blockchain.com hired staff to set up the company's hub in Paris and sought to create local entities across Europe, which were needed to adhere to regulations. To date, the exchange's European operations were managed through a London-based entity.

In 2025, Blockchain.com made Dallas, Texas its United States headquarters. The company also expressed interest in expanding to Africa, as multiple nations began to implement regulations surrounding cryptocurrencies. In addition to expansion-based activities through the year, Blockchain.com donated $5 million to MAGA Inc., a super PAC that supports Donald Trump.

In January 2026, Blockchain.com's conditional Virtual Asset Service Provider license was approved by the Cayman Islands Monetary Authority. Additionally, the company partnered with TechCayman, an immigration and relocation services provider that seeks to encourage the relocation of international companies to Cayman through government frameworks.

In March 2026, Blockchain.com participated in equity fundraising and strategic partnership alongside British politician Nigel Farage for Stack BTC, a London-based company that acquires small British companies and invests surplus capital into bitcoin. In the next month, Farage purchased £2 million worth of bitcoin, filming the transaction taking place at Blockchain.com's London offices.

=== Initial public offering (2026–present) ===
In May 2026, Blockchain.com confidentially filed for an initial public offering with the United States Securities and Exchange Commission (SEC). As of that date, the company had facilitated $1.1 trillion in cryptocurrency transactions from millions of users across over 100 countries. In the same month, Blockchain.com launched SnapMarkets, a prediction market feature that allows users to bet on market conditions, including Bitcoin's price over time. Following this, Blockchain.com partnered with Polymarket in July 2026 to expand its prediction market offerings, with the service going live in eligible markets.

On September 23, 2026, Blockchain.com announced a "strategic collaboration" with the New York Stock Exchange (NYSE) to explore offering tokenized stocks and exchange-traded funds (ETFs) listed on the NYSE. The companies also agreed to share market data, with NYSE parent Intercontinental Exchange providing Blockchain.com with NYSE data for use in its app and Blockchain.com supplying crypto market data and analytics. The collaboration followed regulatory developments in the United States concerning blockchain-based securities, including an SEC exemption permitting platforms to offer blockchain-based versions of stocks and other securities without being subject to certain requirements applicable to traditional stock exchanges.

As of October 2026, Blockchain.com had applied for two licenses with the Commodity Futures Trading Commission (CFTC), seeking to feature event contracts as well as cryptocurrency derivatives, through a designation as a futures commission merchant and as a futures exchange.

== Products and services ==
As a cryptocurrency company, Blockchain.com provides a platform for holding, using, managing crypto assets, and exploring cryptocurrency transactions. It also develops financial services standards and infrastructure for cryptocurrencies. The company's platform provides market data and analytics. It follows cryptocurrency's aims of being decentralized and anonymous; some of its cryptocurrency products are managed by the end user and not accessible by Blockchain.com itself.

Its main products are its cryptocurrency wallet, brokerage, block explorer, prediction markets, and institutional markets offering. As a brokerage, Blockchain.com executes trades for its users by utilizing internal stashes of crypto, or crypto from other exchanges, rather than a usual exchange, which matches buyers and sellers on a platform.

Blockchain.com's revenue is created through transaction fees, subscriptions and services, and trading and venture investments. In 2025, approximately 60% of its total revenue came from its brokerage and blockchain market services, which included providing liquidity for new token launches, and roughly 40% was through retail users.

=== Wallet ===
The company offers a hosted cryptocurrency wallet which is a method to store cryptocurrency in a digital file that can be accessed online. The wallet can be used with different cryptocurrencies and stablecoins. Its wallets can be used to send and receive digital currency transactions, as well as swap between different cryptocurrencies. Blockchain.com has a non-custodial wallet, meaning that it is controlled completely by the user and the company has no access to the wallet's data. Users access their wallet with a private key, a recovery phrase known only to the user. As of November 2025, Blockchain.com had around 39 million verified user wallets associated with its brokerage.

=== Institutional markets business ===
In addition to its services for individuals, Blockchain.com also provides institutional investors with cryptocurrency-based financial services. The company's institutional markets business provides cryptocurrency lending, borrowing, trading and custody of financial assets. It also carries out over-the-counter transactions for large traders, acting as a broker to keep trades private and prevent price swings occurring based on market knowledge of the trades.

=== Explorer ===
The company operates a blockchain explorer that allows the user to see public cryptocurrency transactions and related information. This allows anyone who has a transaction's hash code to see the addresses of the wallets the transaction was sent from and received to, the amount of the transaction, and any fees. The tool can be used for analysis of transaction activity, cryptocurrency data, and analytics. The company sells advertising on the otherwise free service.

== See also ==
- List of bitcoin companies
