= Mika Bomb =

UK musical group

- Origin: London, England
- Genres: Pop punk, garage punk, indie rock, pop
- Years active: 1998–present
- Labels: Grand Royal; Damaged Goods Records
- Members: Mika Handa - lead vocal Mel Roxy - guitar, backing vocal Emiko - bass, backing vocal Debbie - drums
- Past members: Wataru Idol - bass Ergi Ahmed - drums Anko (Ann Sung-an Lee) - guitar Nic Tse- bass Haruna Hayashi - guitar Taku Kawahara (apes) - guitar Agi - guitar Mika Kanayama - bass
- Website: Mika Bomb's page on Damaged Goods' website

Mika Bomb (sometimes spelled Mikabomb) is a London-based, Japanese pop punk band.

== History ==
Lead singer Mika Handa arrived in London in 1998, with the goal of playing in a punk band. Recruitment for the band began with the arrival in London of the guitarist Agi (Chinese: 龙宽 Long Kuan), who later gained broad fame in the electronic duo 龙宽九段 Longkuan Jiuduan. Another Mika (Mika Kanayama) on bass introduced an element of musicality to the bass department while a North London boy, Ergi, provided the drums. Mika has a husband and a daughter, Amy, and Ergi has a wife and two daughters.

In 2000, they signed with the Beastie Boys' label Grand Royal. Mika Bomb performed in the West Country plugging their singles "Super Sexy Razor Happy Girls" and "Heart Attack". They fused Motown, New York punk, 1950s garage rock and Japanese pop to form a distinctive, distortion-heavy pop sound.

2001 saw the release of their debut album The Fake Fake Sound of Mikabomb on the Damaged Goods label after Grand Royal went bust.

Through their career they have played with At the Drive-In, The Donnas, Snuff, Bis, The Datsuns, The D4, Ten Benson and Rosita.

In 2005, they released their second album, Hellcats, which featured a cover of Holly Golightly's "Won't Go Out", with Mika and Holly herself performing a duet on lead vocals.

On 10 December 2005, drummer Ergi fell ill and was rushed to hospital where he was diagnosed as having septicaemia. He survived a week-long, near-fatal coma, but had both his legs amputated below the knee. There were several fundraising events in 2006 to help Ergi cope with the changes in his life, the highlight being a benefit gig at The Garage, Highbury Corner, Islington, London on 15 May 2006.

After making appearance at Rock My Ass festival, Bamberg, Germany in September 2006, the band ceased recording or live activities. When it seemed to be totally over, they reformed in October 2010 for an exclusive show at Camara Japan festival, Rotterdam, Netherlands, then had more or less “once-a-year” reunion in 2011 and 2012. In 2013 more shows are planned in UK and Germany.

== Band members ==
The current line-up is:

- Mika Handa – lead singer
- Mel Roxy – guitar
- Emiko (Wataru Idol) – bass
- Debbie – drums
