= Peter Smyth (disambiguation) =

Peter Smyth was a politician.

Peter or Pete Smyth may also refer to:

- Peter Smyth (footballer), see 1991–92 Manchester United F.C. season
- Pete Smyth (musician), member of Mugstar
- Peter Smyth (equestrian), see 2012 FEI Nations Cup Promotional League

== See also ==
- Peter Smyth House, a historic house in Fayetteville, Arkansas
- Peter Smythe (disambiguation)
- Peter Smith (disambiguation)
