= Pete Smith =

Pete Smith may refer to:

- Pete Smith (announcer) (born 1939), Australian radio and television announcer
- Pete Smith (basketball) (born 1947), former basketball player
- Pete Smith (baseball, born 1940), Major League Baseball pitcher, 1962–1963
- Pete Smith (baseball, born 1966), Major League Baseball pitcher, 1987–1998
- Pete Smith (film producer) (1892–1979), film producer and narrator
- Pete Smith (actor) (1958–2022), New Zealand actor
- Pete Smith (cyclist) (1944–2021), British Olympic cyclist
- Pete Smith (speedway rider, born 1942), British speedway rider
- Pete Smith (speedway rider, born 1957), British speedway rider

== See also ==
- Peter Smith (disambiguation)
