= Peter Smythe =

Peter Smythe may refer to:

- Peter Smythe, see Northern Football League (Australia)
- Peter Smythe, see Candidates of the Victorian state election, 2010
- Peter Smythe, character in Black Christmas (1974 film)

== See also ==
- Peter Smyth (disambiguation)
- Peter Smith (disambiguation)
