= Jackass: The Music, Vol. 1 =

2002 album

Jackass: The Movie (The Official Soundtrack)

Soundtrack album by various artists
- Released: October 25, 2002
- Genres: Punk rock; hard rock; heavy metal; hip hop
- Length: 38:33
- Label: American

Jackass: The Movie (The Official Soundtrack) is the official soundtrack for the American comedy film Jackass: The Movie. The soundtrack, containing music and dialogue from the film, was released on October 25, 2002, on American Recordings. The album made it to #173 on the Billboard 200 and #11 on the Billboard's Top Soundtracks chart. Two songs on the album, "Let's Get Fucked Up" (which contains profanities) and "Baby Got Back" (which contains sexual references), gave it a Parental Advisory warning. The rest of songs contain no explicit content. A clean version of the album, which removes the profanities in "Let's Get Fucked Up", was also released. The song is censored by blanking and the use of a sound of a record scratching.

== Track listing ==
No.	Title	Writer(s)	Artist	Length
1.	"Hi, My Name Is Johnny Knoxville" (Spoken word intro)	N/A	Johnny Knoxville	0:04
2.	"Corona"	D. Boon	Minutemen	2:25
3.	"We Want Fun"	Andrew W.K.	Andrew W.K.	3:57
4.	"Flesh into Gear"	Deron Miller, Chad I Ginsburg, Jess Margera	CKY	3:06
5.	"Somebody's Gonna Get Their Head Kicked in Tonight"	Jeremy Spencer	The Rezillos	1:54
6.	"California Sun"	Henry Glover, Morris Levy	Ramones	1:59
7.	"Alright, Alright (Here's My Fist Where's the Fight?)"	Maria Andersson	Sahara Hotnights	2:08
8.	"Let's Get Fucked Up"	John Ransom, Gish Thornton, Julia Kwong, Roger Ramjet	Smut Peddlers	2:15
9.	"Hybrid Moments"	Glenn Danzig	Misfits	1:41
10.	"Cha Cha Twist"	Les McCann	The Detroit Cobras	2:30
11.	"Angel of Death"	Jeff Hanneman	Slayer	4:51
12.	"Baby Got Back"	Sir Mix-a-Lot	Sir Mix-a-Lot	4:21
13.	"How Did That Get There?" (spoken word outro)	N/A	Ryan Dunn	0:05
14.	"If You're Gonna Be Dumb"	Roger Alan Wade	Roger Alan Wade	3:08
15.	"Party Boy Theme" (hidden track; pressed as continuation of track 14)	Dave Roen	Dave Roen	4:07
