= Fabienne Delsol =

French singer

- Born: Limoges, France
- Origin: London, England
- Genres: Garage rock, pop, psychedelic
- Occupation: Singer
- Years active: 1996–present
- Label: Damaged Goods
- Formerly of: The Bristols

Fabienne Delsol is a French singer who performs primarily in English. Influenced by the 1960s, her music is a mix of garage rock, pop and psychedelic music.

== Biography ==
Delsol grew up in Limoges, France. In 1995, she moved to London, attracted by the London music scene.

That same year the group's first single, "Questions I Can't Answer", was released by Damaged Goods. Delsol toured Europe for much of the next five years with other Damaged Goods acts, including Thee Headcoats, and Cee Bee Beaumont.

After two albums and three singles, Delsol decided to pursue a solo career. In 2004, she released No Time for Sorrows.

Delsol's third solo album On My Mind was released in 2010.

Her fourth album, Four, was released in 2019, co-produced by herself and Luke Oldfield, was called "possibly her strongest...She commands your attention with affecting melodies..."

In April 2019, her song I'm Gonna Haunt You was on the Killing Eve soundtrack.

== Discography ==
=== Albums with the Bristols ===
- Introducing… the Bristols (Damaged Goods, 2000)
- Tune in With… the Bristols (Damaged Goods, 2001)
- The Best of Fabienne Delsol & the Bristols (Damaged Goods, 2007)

=== Solo albums ===
- No Time for Sorrows (Damaged Goods, 2004)
- Between You and Me (Damaged Goods, 2007)
- On My Mind (Damaged Goods, 2010)
- Four (Damaged Goods, 2019)
- Indigo Red (Damaged Goods, 2026)
