= Pork Dukes =

British punk rock group

- Origin: London, England
- Genres: Punk rock, new wave
- Years active: 1976–1979, 1993, 2001–present
- Labels: Wood, Vinyl Japan, Snail, Damaged Goods, Detour
- Members: Colin Goldring; Stewart Goldring; Vince Santini; Bonk
- Past members: Scabs; Germun LePig; Mack E. Valley; Guardian Angel
- Website: porkdukes.net

The Pork Dukes are an English punk rock band, formed 1976 during the first wave of British punk in London.

== History ==
The band was originally composed of twin brothers and former Gnidrolog members Colin Goldring (vocals / guitar) and Stewart Goldring (guitar / vocals) using the pseudonyms Vilos and Horrendus Styles, respectively – alongside Scabs (aka Rick Kemp of Steeleye Span) (bass guitar), Germun LePig (aka Nigel Pegrum, also of Steeleye Span and previously in Gnidrolog) (drums) (later replaced by Bonk aka. Rocky Rhythm) and Mack E. Valley (keyboards). He was later replaced by Guardian Angel partway through the recording sessions for the second album.

Combining a Buzzcocks-style pop punk sound with bawdy subject matter, gross-out toilet humour and profanity in their songs, the band released their debut single "Bend and Flush" b/w "Throbbing Gristle" in 1977 on Wood Records, a subsidiary of Caroline Records UK created specifically for the band.

Due to the lyrical content of their recordings, the band struggled for airplay, though BBC Radio 1 DJ John Peel was a fan.

The true identities of the Pork Dukes were originally a closely guarded secret, the band playing in pig masks during live performances. Various rumours circulated amongst fans and in the music press that the band was actually Led Zeppelin, Steeleye Span, The Rezillos, Fairport Convention or Tenpole Tudor in disguise. It was also suggested that either Keith Moon or Dudley Moore may have been lead singer.

The controversy surrounding the band and backlash from feminist groups led to them being unable to find a management company to represent them or perform at large venues (gigs were frequently played unannounced at small community centres to avoid protesters). Towards the end the band were playing gigs at mental institutions (Vilos Styles was training to become a psychiatric nurse at this point) to entertain the patients.

Following the release of the studio album Pink Pork and three singles on Wood Records, the band broke up in 1979, with the album Pig Out of Hell being released posthumously by Wood somewhere between 1979 and 1981. Bonk (aka. Rocky Rhythm) later played for The Revillos, Tenpole Tudor and The Damned frontman Dave Vanian's Phantom Chords.

In April 2001, the Pork Dukes reformed with Max Styles on drums and Andy Pandy on bass to record "Save the Pigs", following the foot and mouth outbreak in the UK. Bonk (aka. Rocky Rhythm) rejoined in 2002 and the band recorded the live album Squeal Meat Again at the Cartoon Club in Croydon, South London. In November 2002, the Styles/Styles/Styles/Pandy line-up embarked on the band's first US tour taking in eight dates in Pennsylvania and New York supported by The Clap. New member Vince Santini (ex-The Revillos) joined on bass guitar / vocals in 2003 after Pandy left the UK. They continue to record and tour.

On 30 August 2008, the band played a one-off gig at London's 12 Bar Club.

== Discography ==
Pink Pork

Studio album by Pork Dukes
- Released: November 1978 (first pressing); 28 December 1979 (second pressing)
- Recorded: Late 1977
- Genre: Punk rock, new wave
- Label: Wood Records

Pig Out Of Hell

Studio album by Pork Dukes
- Released: December 1979
- Recorded: May–December 1978
- Genre: Punk rock, new wave
- Label: Wood Records

Pig In A Poke

Studio album by Pork Dukes
- Released: January 1982
- Recorded: 1978–1979
- Genre: Punk rock, new wave
- Label: Wood Records

Filthy Nasty

EP by Pork Dukes
- Released: 1994
- Recorded: Live at London, January 1977
- Genre: Punk rock, new wave

All the Filth!

Compilation album by Pork Dukes
- Released: 1999
- Recorded: 1977–1978, 1993
- Genre: Punk rock, new wave
- Length: 59:48
- Label: Vinyl Japan (Re-issued by Damaged Goods Records, 2007)

2007 reissue cover
- 30th Anniversary Edition

=== Singles ===
- "Bend and Flush" b/w "Throbbing Gristle" (1977)
- "Making Bacon" b/w "Tight Pussy" (1977)
- "Telephone Masturbator" b/w "Melody Makers" (1978)
- "Pop Stars" b/w "Save the Pigs, Burn the Fucking Farmers (God Save the Pigs)" (2005)

=== EPs ===
- "Filthy Nasty: Live" (1994)
- "Telephone Masturbator EP" (1999)
- "Pop Stars EP" (2004)

=== Albums ===
- Pink Pork (1977)
- Pig Out of Hell (1978)
- Pig In A Poke (1979)

==== Pink Pork/Pork Dukes ====
"Pork Dukes" is the first studio album by the Pork Dukes. This album is commonly known as "Pink Pork". Although this album was believed by many sites as released in 1979, these sites were going by the release year of the second pressing. The first pressing of the album, known as just "Pork Dukes", was pressed in November 1978, while the second pressing, known as "Pink Pork", was pressed in December 1979. This album was very obscure in the punk industry, but it is noted by most fans of the Pork Dukes for its profane toilet humor.

Track listing:
1. Dirty Boys (You Dirty Cunts)
2. Stuck Up (Your Ass)
3. Bend & Flush
4. Melody Maker (You're Just A Bunch Of Wankers)
5. Telephone (Masturbator)
6. Sick For Sex
7. Down Down Down
8. Soho Girls
9. Tight Pussy
10. (I Like Your) Big Tits (Let's See If It Fits)
11. Penicillin Princess
12. Loser
Notes:
Track 3 is a re-recording with the organs.
Tracks 4–5 is also found on their third single.
Track 6 on the vinyl pressings is mislabeled as "Sick Of Sex".
Track 9 is also found as the B-side of their second single called "Making Bacon".

==== Pig Out Of Hell ====
"Pig Out Of Hell" is the Pork Dukes second studio album (their posthumous album). This album is rarer than "Pink Pork" and no singles were released from this album. This album was released in 1980 although recorded in 1978. Track listing:
1. Devil Driver
2. House Of The Rising Sun
3. Three Men In An Army Truck
4. My Mother Gave Me A Gun For Christmas
5. Gin Sin
6. Let's Spend The Night Together
7. I'm A Guitar
8. Day Tripper
9. Do You Love Me
10. Marxist Leninist Feminist
11. Around And Around

==== Pig In A Poke ====
"Pig In A Poke" is another posthumous album by the Pork Dukes recorded in 1979, but released three years after in 1982. This album is extremely rare; even rarer than "Pig Out Of Hell". None of the songs from this album are put into any compilations.

==== Filthy Nasty ====
"The Filthy Nasty Pork Dukes E.P." (a.k.a. Filthy Nasty) is a live E.P. released by the Pork Dukes in 1994. This performance was four tracks long and was performed in 1977, before their "Bend & Flush" single was released the same year in August. The sound quality is a little poor and the vocals are rather low in the mix.
Track listing:
1. Telephone Masturbator
2. Bend & Flush
3. Down Down Down
4. Throbbing Gristle

==== All the Filth! ====
All the Filth! is a Pork Dukes compilation album. Released in 1999, it is notable as the first CD release to feature some of the band's long out-of-print 1970s era recordings. Alongside the A and B-sides of the first three singles and a selection of tracks from the studio albums Pink Pork and Pig Out of Hell, the album also featured several previously unreleased tracks from the Pink Pork sessions and unreleased material recorded in the early 1990s. The album was re-issued by Damaged Goods Records in 2007 with four additional tracks from the 2004 Pop Stars EP.

==== Squeal Meat Again! ====
Squeal Meat Again

Live album by Pork Dukes
- Released: 2002
- Recorded: The Cartoon Club, Croydon, 10 May 2002
- Length: 51:55
- Label: Snail
- Producer: Henry Krinkle

Squeal Meat Again! is the first full-length live album from the Pork Dukes. It was recorded on 10 May 2002, at The Cartoon Club, Croydon, shortly following the band's decision to reform.

==== Kum Kleen! ====
Kum Kleen!

Compilation album by Pork Dukes
- Released: 2003
- Recorded: 1976−79
- Genre: Punk rock, new wave
- Length: 47:26
- Label: Damaged Goods

Kum Kleen! is a compilation album from the Pork Dukes. Alongside a first-time-on-CD roundup of tracks from the long deleted albums Pink Pork and Pig Out of Hell, the compilation features several previously unreleased studio rarities dating from 1976−79 and the Filthy Nasty: Live 7-inch EP in its entirety.
