= Coalition for App Fairness =

Mobile device app developer advocacy group

- Formation: 24 September 2020
- Founder: Epic Games
- Headquarters: Washington, D.C.
- Executive Director: Meghan DiMuzio
- Website: appfairness.org

The Coalition for App Fairness (CAF) is a coalition comprised by companies, who aim to reach a fairer deal for the inclusion of their apps into the Apple App Store or the Google Play Store. The organization's executive director is Meghan DiMuzio and its headquarters are located in Washington, D.C.

== Background ==
In July 2015, Spotify launched an email campaign to urge its App Store subscribers to cancel their subscriptions and start new ones through its website, bypassing the 30% transaction fee for in-app purchases required for iOS applications by technology company Apple Inc. A later update to the Spotify app on iOS was rejected by Apple, prompting Spotify's general counsel Horacio Gutierrez to write a letter to Apple's then-general counsel Bruce Sewell, stating: "This latest episode raises serious concerns under both U.S. and EU competition law. It continues a troubling pattern of behavior by Apple to exclude and diminish the competitiveness of Spotify on iOS and as a rival to Apple Music, particularly when seen against the backdrop of Apple's previous anticompetitive conduct aimed at Spotify … we cannot stand by as Apple uses the App Store approval process as a weapon to harm competitors."

In August 2020, Epic Games updated their Fortnite Battle Royale game app on both Apple's App Store and Google's Google Play to include its own storefront that offered a 20% discount on V-Bucks, the in-game currency, if players bought through there rather than through the app stores' storefront, both which take a 30% revenue cut of the sale. Both Apple and Google removed the Fortnite app within hours, as this alternate storefront violated their terms of use that required all in-app purchases to be made through their storefronts. Epic immediately filed lawsuits against both companies challenging their storefront policies on antitrust principles, arguing that their non-negotiable 30% revenue cut is too high and the restrictions against alternate storefronts anticompetitive. Apple countersued Epic over its behavior, leading to a highly publicized 2021 bench trial.

Ultimately, Epic largely lost its lawsuit against Apple, though the court did order Apple to allow developers to point users to alternative payment methods. Conversely, Epic won its antitrust lawsuit against Google in late 2023.

== Foundation ==
On 24 September 2020, Epic Games joined forces with thirteen other prominent companies—including the music streaming platform Spotify, Tinder owner Match Group, the encrypted mail service Proton Mail, and the crypto currency website Blockchain.com—to establish the Coalition for App Fairness. It also includes Basecamp.

The coalition criticizes the fact that for now the app stores of both Apple and Google charge their clients a 30% fee on any purchases made over their stores. Apple and Google defended themselves by arguing that the 30% transaction fee is a standard in the industry while the Coalition for App Fairness states that there is no other transaction fee which is even close to the 30%.

In October 2020, it was reported that the coalition grew from 13 to 40 members since its foundation and received more than 400 applications for membership.

In October 2025, X (formerly Twitter) joined CAF. This was seen as a larger pushback in the industry against Apple and Google, and a step towards hopefully passing the Bipartisan Open App Markets Act.

== Aims ==
The group has broadened their demands for the app stores and now also aim for a better treatment for the apps available in the App Store. They claim that Apple favors its own services before other services available on the market and unjustifiably excludes other apps from their App Store. The group has also been viewing other transaction fees like the 5% fee which is charged by credit card companies, and states that Apple charges up to 600% more and would like the 30% fee, which was only included in 2011 by Apple, adapted to a comparable percentage that charge other providers of payment solutions. Its demands are mainly directed at Apple's strict control over its App Store, but to a lesser extent are also directed towards Google. Google allows apps to be downloaded over an independent web link or also another App Store, such as the Epic Game App Store. The organization emphasizes that no app developer should come into the position in which they are discriminated and are not granted the same rights as to the developers of the owner of the app store.

== Reactions ==
In October 2020, Microsoft presented a new framework concerning the access to its Windows 10 operating system by app stores other than the one offered by Microsoft. The new framework is based on the demands of the Coalition for App Fairness. Microsoft emphasized though, that these principles would not apply to the Xbox.

In December 2020, Apple announced that they would be lowering the revenue cut Apple takes for app developers making $1M or less from 30% to 15% if app developers fill out an application for the lowered revenue cut.

In March 2021, Google followed suit by also lowering the revenue cut from the Play Store from 30% to 15% for the first million in revenue earned by a developer each year.

== Notable members ==
Members listed are notable companies listed as members the groups website:

- Blockchain.com
- Deezer
- Epic Games
- European Digital SME Alliance
- Fanfix
- Life360
- Masimo
- Nium
- Proton Mail
- Spotify
- TapTap
- Threema
- Vipps
