= Damaged Goods (record label) =

British record label

Damaged Goods is a British independent record label.

== History ==
Damaged Goods records formed in 1988 from a living room in east London. The first release was a re-issue of the 1977 single by Slaughter and the Dogs, "Where Have All the Bootboys Gone?". Following positive reviews in the UK music press it was followed by a reissue of the same band's debut album Do It Dog Style. Releases by Adam and the Ants, The Killjoys, Pork Dukes, and Snivelling Shits followed. Damaged Goods was originally intended to be a punk re-issue label but by 1990 was releasing contemporary bands, including a single by The Sect, and the debut EP by Manic Street Preachers.

In early 1991, they released their first single by Billy Childish (with Thee Headcoats), followed by many more, including the debut Thee Headcoatees single. They now manage the Billy Childish back catalogue. Between 1992 and 1994, Damaged Goods released the debut single from Helen Love along with one-off singles with Atari Teenage Riot, New Bomb Turks, Wat Tyler and Asian Dub Foundation. By 1995, DG was a full-time occupation concentrating on the UK garage punk scene based around Toe Rag Studios in London and Slim Chance's Wild Western Rooms in Archway, as well as indie and punk releases.

In 1995, they released the debut Holly Golightly album The Good Things. They have since released fifteen albums by Holly.

Over the next decade Damaged Goods released records by J Church, TV Personalities, The Revillos, Mikabomb, The Priscillas, The Buff Medways, and Buzzcocks

2008 saw the release of new albums from Billy Childish and his new band The Musicians of the British Empire and a second album from Holly Golightly & The Brokeoffs. Re-issues included Psykik Volts, Thee Headcoatees, Johnny Moped, Thee Milkshakes and Rudi and further releases included Betty and the Werewolves, the debut album from The Wolfmen and new albums from Ludella Black and Graham Day & the Gaolers.

In 2010 Damaged Goods was named 'DIY Label of the Week' by BBC Radio 1 journalist Huw Stephens.

During the 2010s Damaged Goods released new albums by Johnny Moped, Cyanide Pills, Cowbell, Giuda, Fabienne Delsol, The Senior Service, The Cute Lepers, Pete Molinari, Piney Gir & many more.

2018 was Damaged Goods 30th anniversary and is celebrating with a retrospective compilation and a 7" singles club as well as five gigs in London.

Latest signings include Amyl and the Sniffers, Galileo 7, Thee Dagger Debs & The Shadracks

== Artists ==
- Action Painting
- Adam and the Ants
- Agebaby
- Age of Jets
- Amyl and the Sniffers
- Anorak Girl
- Armitage Shanks
- Asian Dub Foundation
- Baby Birkin
- Bambi
- Betty and the Werewolves
- Bette Davis and the Balconettes
- Big Boy Tomato
- Billy Childish
- Blaggers ITA
- Blubber
- The Bolsheviks
- The Bristols
- The Budget Girls
- Butcher Boy
- Buzzcocks
- Case
- Cee Bee Beaumont
- The Chefs
- Clayson and the Argonauts
- Cowbell
- Cuban Boys
- Cyanide Pills
- Deep Wound
- The Del Monas
- The Dils
- The Dirty Burds
- Dustball
- Dutronc
- Dweeb
- Terry Edwards
- Fabienne Delsol
- Fire Dept.
- Formica
- The Gaggers
- The Galileo 7
- Genius Freak
- Giuda
- Goldblade Featuring Poly Styrene
- Graham Day and the Gaolers
- Guaranteed Ugly
- Guy Hamper Trio
- Hard Skin
- Helen Love
- Holly Golightly
- Honeyrider
- Hopper
- Huegunius
- Identity
- J Church
- Jimi Ben Band
- Johnny Moped
- The Killjoys
- Kyra Rubella
- Lockjaw
- Lovesick
- Ludicrous Lollipops
- The Lurkers
- Manic Street Preachers
- Ludella Black
- The Melons
- Thee Mighty Caesars
- Mikabomb
- The Milkshakes
- Monkhouse
- Nat Johnson and the Figureheads
- New Bomb Turks
- Oizone
- One Car Pile-Up
- Pansy Division
- Pebbles
- PeeChees
- Penetration
- Period Pains
- Pete Molinari
- Phantom Pregnancies
- Piney Gir
- Piney Gir Country Roadshow
- Pop Rivets
- Pork Dukes
- Pop Am Good
- Psykik Volts
- The pUKEs
- Reverse
- The Revillos
- Roadholders
- Roxy Epoxy & The Rebound
- Rugrat
- The Sect
- The Senior Service
- Serious Drinking European Cup Squad
- Severed Limb
- Sexton Ming
- Shelley's Children
- The Shadracks
- The Shall I Say Quois
- Shout
- Singing Loins
- Slaughter And The Dogs
- Slime
- Snap Her
- The SolarFlares
- Some Chicken
- Thee Spivs
- Spizzenergi
- Thee Stash
- Stratford Sparrows
- Stuckists
- Supercute
- Talulah Gosh
- Television Personalities
- Thee Dagger Debs
- Thee Headcoats
- Thee Headcoatees
- Thrilled Skinny
- Toast
- The Unwanted
- The Users
- Wat Tyler
- Wild Billy Childish and the Blackhands
- Wild Billy Childish and the Buff Medways
- Wild Billy Childish and the Chatham Singers
- Wild Billy Childish and CTMF
- Wild Billy Childish and the Musicians of the British Empire
- Wild Billy Childish and the Spartan Dreggs
- Witch
- The Wolfmen

== See also ==
- List of record labels
- List of independent UK record labels
