= Rome2Rio =

Australian multimodal transport search engine

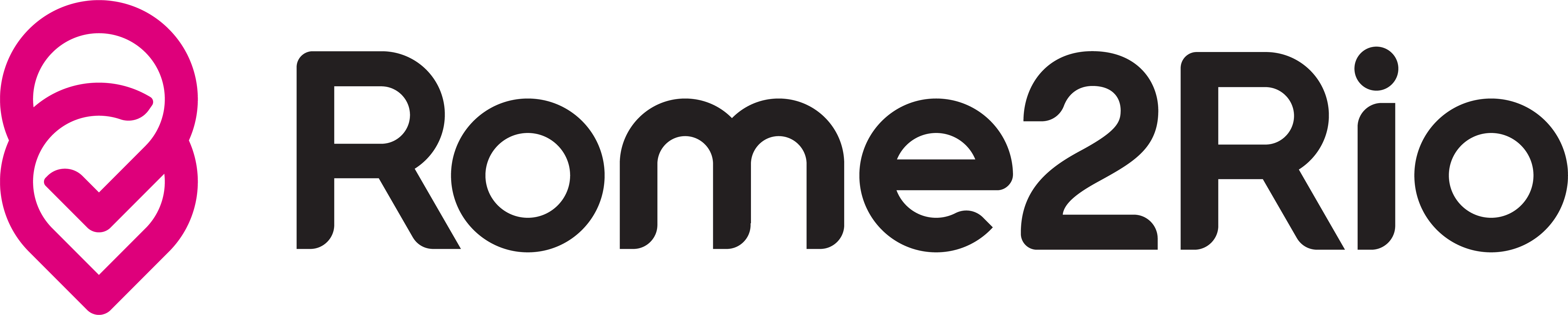
- Founded: September 2010; 16 years ago
- Headquarters: Melbourne, Australia
- Area served: Worldwide
- Owner: Omio
- Founder: Michael Cameron; Bernhard Tschirren
- Industry: Travel website Search engine
- Website: rome2rio.com

Rome2Rio is an Australian online multimodal transport journey planner offering travel services globally. The company is based in Melbourne, Australia, and is owned by the German online travel comparison and booking website Omio.

== History ==
Rome2Rio was founded by Bernhard Tschirren and Michael Cameron, former Microsoft software engineers, who began working on the project in September 2010. The beta version of Rome2Rio was launched on 7 April 2011.

In May 2012, Rod Cuthbert, founder of Viator, became CEO, and the company raised $450,000 in funding. Rome2Rio has received several awards, including the People's Choice Award at Phocuswright 2012, the TRAVELtech Global Collect Website of the Year in 2013, the Data Specialist Award at the WITovation Awards in 2015, and the Best Metasearch Award at the Travolution Awards in 2016.

The company raised a total of $2.8 million in funding, including a $1.2 million grant from Commercialisation Australia in 2014. In July 2015, Rome2Rio announced that support for its white-label product would cease in January 2016 due to development resource pressures from rapid growth in its consumer business. Initially, the company offered both white-label products and application programming interface options for partners integrating its multimodal results into websites and mobile apps.

In 2016, the company introduced direct booking options. In April 2017, Rod Cuthbert became Executive Chairman, Michael Cameron became CEO, and Bernie Tschirren was appointed Chief Architect. Kirsteene Phelan became COO. In November 2017, Rome2Rio moved to a new headquarters in Richmond, Melbourne's digital quarter.

In July 2019, Craig Penfold joined the company as Chief Technology Officer. In October 2019, Rome2Rio was acquired by Omio, a Berlin-based travel booking platform. In January 2020, Yeswanth Munnangi became CEO, and Michael Cameron joined the board of directors.
