= The Rezillos =

Scottish band

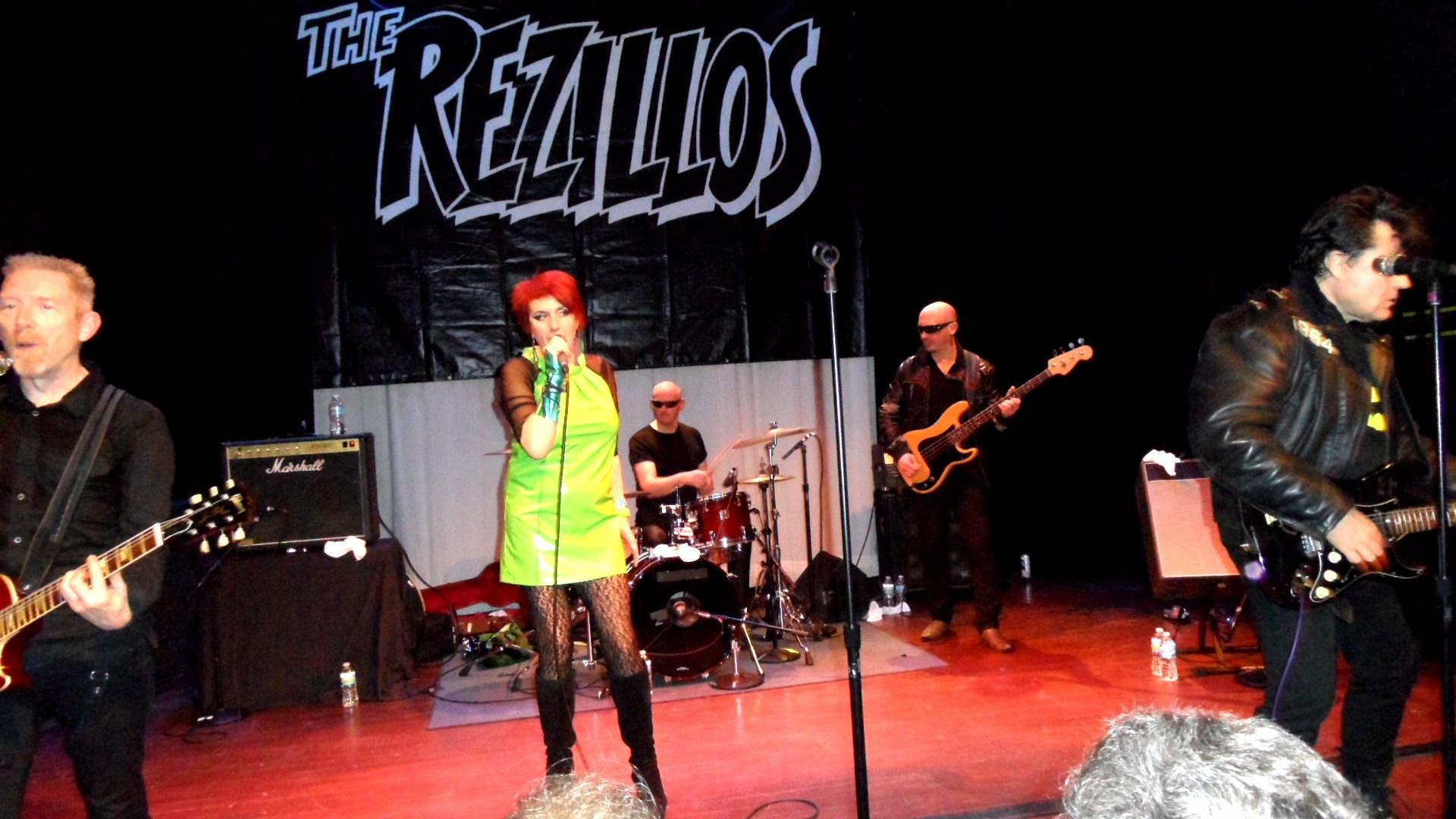
- Left to right: Jim Brady, Fay Fife, Angel Paterson, Chris Agnew, Eugene Reynolds (photo 2012)

Background information
- Origin: Edinburgh, Scotland
- Genres: Punk rock; new wave
- Years active: The Rezillos: 1976–1978, 2001–present The Revillos: 1979–1985, 1994, 1996
- Labels: Sensible; Sire
- Members: Eugene Reynolds; Fay Fife; Willy Molleson; Chris Agnew; Phil Thompson
- Past members: The Rezillos: Jo Callis; Dr D.K. Smythe; William Mysterious; Hi-Fi Harris; Gayle Warning; Simon Templar; Johnny Terminator; Jim Brady; Angel Paterson The Revillos: Rocky Rhythm; Kid Krupa; Felix; Vince Santini; Max Atom; Fabian Wonderful; Buck Moon
- Website: rezillos.rocks revillos.co.uk

The Rezillos are a punk and new wave band formed in Edinburgh, Scotland, in 1976. Although emerging at the same time as other bands in the punk rock movement, the Rezillos did not share the nihilism or social commentary of their contemporaries. Instead, the band took a more light-hearted approach in their songs; at the time, they preferred to describe themselves as "a new wave beat group". Their songs are heavily influenced by 1950s rock and roll, 1960s English beat music and garage rock, early 1970s glam rock, with recurring lyrical themes of science fiction and B movies; their influences mirrored those of US bands the Cramps and the B-52s, who were starting out at the same time. The Rezillos' biggest hit in their home country was the UK Top 20 single "Top of the Pops" in 1978, but they are best known outside the UK for their cover version of "Somebody's Gonna Get Their Head Kicked In Tonight", which was featured on the soundtrack to Jackass: The Movie in 2002. Since the Rezillos recorded it, the song has been covered by other punk bands, including Youth Brigade and Murphy's Law.

Released in July 1978, the Rezillos' first studio album Can't Stand the Rezillos is considered a classic album of the first wave of British punk, but the group split up four months after its release, following internal arguments about their future direction. After the Rezillos split, the band's guitarist and principal songwriter, Jo Callis, briefly joined a couple of unsuccessful Edinburgh post-punk groups before being invited to join the Human League. He went on to co-write some of the Human League's best known songs during their most successful period, including their biggest worldwide hit, "Don't You Want Me". The Rezillos' vocalists, Eugene Reynolds and Fay Fife, formed the Revillos, a group with an ever-changing line-up that continued where the Rezillos left off. The Revillos split up in 1985, briefly reforming in 1994 for a tour of Japan, and again in 1996 for a UK tour. In 2001 the Rezillos reformed after being invited to play at Edinburgh's Hogmanay celebrations, and have continued to play live ever since, as well as releasing new singles occasionally.

== History ==
=== The Rezillos (1976–1978) ===
The group started life at Edinburgh College of Art, where most of the Rezillos' original line-up were studying. During 1975 art students Jo Callis and Alan Forbes had been in a college group named The Knutsford Dominators, a party band playing 1950s and 1960s rock and roll cover versions: Forbes was originally one of the group's two drummers. The Knutsford Dominators were short-lived, but Callis and Forbes wanted to carry on making music in a similar vein. The pair recruited local bass player Dave Smythe and fellow student Mark Sinclair Harris, who was studying architecture at the college, on second guitar, and formed their new band the Rezillos in March 1976. The band name was adapted from the name of a club called "Revilos" that appeared in the first issue of the DC Comics publication The Shadow in November 1973. At the start, Callis, Forbes and Harris shared vocal duties, but as all of them found it difficult to play an instrument and sing at the same time, Forbes switched to vocals full-time and was replaced on drums by Alasdair Paterson, another Edinburgh College of Art architecture student. By August 1976 the band had recruited saxophonist Alastair Donaldson, a friend of Paterson who was an architecture student from neighbouring Heriot-Watt University taking some of his classes at the college, and who had previously played with Edinburgh folk rock band Silly Wizard. Forbes had also introduced two fashion design students named Sheilagh Hynd and Gail Jamieson (aka Gayle Warning) to the group as backing singers.

Each member took on stage names for the new band: Forbes had re-christened himself Eugene Reynolds after the name of somebody he met during his summer job, and the wraparound sunglasses that would become his trademark on stage were found on a beach. Harris became "Hi-Fi" Harris, Smythe became Dr D.K. Smythe, Donaldson called himself William Mysterious, and Paterson assumed the first name of Angel. After a short spell as "Candy Floss", Hynd changed her name to Fay Fife, a joke relating to her birthplace ("from Fife", spoken in her native Dunfermline accent). Callis and Jamieson used the punning names of Luke Warm and Gail Warning.

Having spent several months practising, the group's debut live performance was at Teviot Row House, the students' union building of the University of Edinburgh, on 5 November 1976, playing a set composed entirely of cover versions of 1950s and 1960s classics. The set included "I Like It" and "Somebody's Gonna Get Their Head Kicked in Tonite", which would both appear on the band's debut album, and concluded with "I Wanna Be Your Man", which later became the B-side of their debut single. The band were an instant hit and began to grow rapidly in popularity as they gigged constantly: Callis estimated that the Rezillos played around 200 gigs in 1977. Bootleg recordings exist of this stage of the band's history.

During the first half of 1977 Reynolds and Fife became romantically involved, and Fife moved to being the group's frontwoman alongside Reynolds. Gail Warning's contributions to the group were effectively made redundant, and she left the band. In June 1977 the band recorded their début single, "Can't Stand My Baby" (with "I Wanna Be Your Man" on the B-side), at Barclay Towers, the "studio" being little more than some recording equipment set up in producer Tony Pilley's top-floor tenement flat in Bruntsfield in south-west Edinburgh. The single was released in August on Sensible Records, an independent Edinburgh label run by Island Records local representative Lenny Love, and attracted radio airplay and attention from several major labels, including Sire Records who sent a telegram to Love three weeks after the release of "Can't Stand My Baby" asking for more information about the band.

By the time of the single's release the band had made a decision to turn professional, and had decided to sign to Sire as the label was home at that time to such other rising new wave and punk acts as Talking Heads and the Ramones. Not wanting to give up their professional careers, Smythe and Harris left the group amicably to return to their academic studies, and Mysterious switched to the bass guitar. The slimmed-down five-piece band recorded their second single, "(My Baby Does) Good Sculptures", and its B-side "Flying Saucer Attack" in the more professional surroundings of REL Records studio in Edinburgh in October 1977. Due to their recent signing "Good Sculptures" was not released on Sensible Records as originally intended, but became the group's first release on Sire instead. This grazed the lower reaches of the UK Singles Chart, and contained different versions of the songs found on the album release. The single was also released in the Netherlands, where the two sides of the record were reversed and "Flying Saucer Attack" was made the A-side.

At Sire's suggestion the band recorded their début album Can't Stand the Rezillos in February 1978 at the newly built Power Station studio in New York City, owned by the producer of several of Sire's punk and new wave acts, Tony Bongiovi. Bongiovi was originally scheduled to produce the whole of the album, but illness meant he had to hand over production duties to his assistant Lance Quinn and his engineer Bob Clearmountain for much of the album's recording. The album featured re-recorded versions of "Can't Stand My Baby", "(My Baby Does) Good Sculptures" and "Flying Saucer Attack". Its release was then delayed for three months while Sire waited for their distribution deal with Phonogram Records to run out so that they could switch to Warner Bros. Records, who had recently acquired the Sire label. This soured the group's relationship with the record label, as they felt they were losing the momentum they had built up and twice had to cancel a planned tour. Bass player William Mysterious left the Rezillos, frustrated at the lack of activity, and the band brought in Simon Templar (real name Simon Bloomfield) to replace him. A third single was released to coincide with the album, a re-recorded version of the album track "Top of the Pops" with Templar on bass, as opposed to the album version which featured Mysterious.

Can't Stand the Rezillos was released in July 1978 and reached number 16 in the UK Albums Chart. The single "Top of the Pops" also made the top 20 of the UK Singles Chart, reaching number 17, and ironically earned the group an appearance on the British television programme of the same name, implicitly criticised in the song's lyrics.

In October 1978, the group recorded a new single, "Destination Venus", with producer Martin Rushent at The Manor, for release the following month. By now there were growing tensions within the band about the group's future direction (Smythe observed that from the start there had always been two factions within the band, one centred on boyfriend/girlfriend vocalists Reynolds and Fife, and the other on songwriter Callis), and with what they felt was poor treatment from their label: Reynolds was unhappy with Sire's choice of photographer for the single's cover and the single's mix and £5000 cost. Matters came to a head in November 1978, when after just five dates into a lengthy UK tour with The Undertones as support band, vocalist Fife developed scarring of the vocal cords, resulting in the postponement of the rest of the tour. During the hiatus Fife recalled that Callis had told her and Reynolds that "the other three in the band wanted to toe the line more because of pressure from our manager, who was finding the job really difficult, and he was getting pressure from the record company to make us act as though we liked them". Reynolds and Fife refused to agree to this, and unable to reach a consensus, on 22 November 1978 the Rezillos made the decision to split up. They did, however, reunite to play the last scheduled date of the aborted tour at the Glasgow Apollo on 23 December 1978, as a farewell concert. The show featured guest spots by former members William Mysterious on saxophone and Gail Warning on backing vocals. The concert was recorded and released in April 1979 as the live album Mission Accomplished ... But the Beat Goes On. In 1993, this record was included almost in its entirety on an expanded version of the début album, now retitled Can't Stand the Rezillos: The (Almost) Complete Rezillos.

=== The Revillos (1979–1996) ===
After the Rezillos split, guitarist Callis, bassist Templar and drummer Paterson formed Shake with Troy Tate (who would go on to join The Teardrop Explodes), releasing an EP and two singles (the latter single under the name Jo Callis/S.H.A.K.E. Project). The group were not successful and after they split Paterson joined local Edinburgh band TV21, featuring on their album A Thin Red Line. After briefly playing in Edinburgh post-punk band Boots for Dancing, Callis was invited to join The Human League by their manager Bob Last, just as The Human League were embarking on their most successful period of their career (Last had also been the Rezillos' manager). Callis left The Human League in 1985 (although he continued to write songs for them) and rejoined Paterson and some of his former Boots for Dancing bandmates in a new band called S.W.A.L.K., but the band split after releasing just one six-track mini-album.

Sire agreed to release Reynolds and Fife from their contract, providing that the pair did not use the name "The Rezillos". Joining up with former bandmate Hi-Fi Harris and Reynolds' brother Rocky Rhythm (real name Nicky Forbes) on drums, they renamed themselves the Revillos, and continued to make music in a similar style to their former band. The Revillos had a longer career than the Rezillos, and toured and released music continually during the first half of the 1980s. The band had an ever-changing line-up, but the focus and only permanent members during this period remained Reynolds and Fife. The Revillos (and Reynolds and Fife's relationship) came to an end in 1985, although versions of the band reformed briefly in May 1994 for a tour of Japan (where the Revillos remained popular), and again in April 1996 for a UK tour. The 1994 Japan tour was recorded and released as the live album Live and On Fire in Japan; the 1996 UK tour was to promote a rarities compilation album, From the Freezer.

=== Reformation of the Rezillos (2001–present) ===
In 2001, the Rezillos were persuaded to reform and play at Edinburgh's Hogmanay celebrations by Stuart Nisbit, guitarist for the festival's headline act The Proclaimers. The line-up was the same as on the Can't Stand the Rezillos album except for Johnny Terminator (real name Johnny Brady) replacing Mysterious on bass. The success of the Hogmanay concert led to concerts in Europe, the US, South America and Japan, often to younger crowds introduced to the band by the use of their track "Somebody's Gonna Get their Head Kicked in Tonight" in Jackass: The Movie. The Rezillos had only ever played two gigs outside the UK previously, one in France and one at CBGB during the recording of the album in New York.

In 2008 Johnny Terminator retired from the band and was replaced by Chris Agnew. The Rezillos performed Can't Stand the Rezillos in its entirety on their 2008 UK tour, and in January 2009 a new download only single, "No 1 Boy", was released on the band's website. In 2010, original founding member Jo Callis left the band and was replaced on guitar by Jim Brady (brother of former bassist Johnny Brady), formerly of Nanobots and techno-grunge duo Barky!Barky.

In November 2011 the band were presented with the Sir Reo Stakis Foundation Legend Award at Scotland's Tartan Clef awards, and in December 2011 released a single, "Out Of This World". Unlike "No 1 Boy" the new single was produced in CD and 7" vinyl formats as well as digital download, although delivery of the vinyl was delayed when the pressing plant in the Czech Republic burnt down just a week before the scheduled release date. The single was followed by a December UK tour.

In November 2012, the Rezillos undertook their first full tour of North America.

In November 2018 Jim Brady announced that he was leaving the band; he was replaced by Phil Thompson (of Department S).

Former member Dennis Schiavon, a.k.a. Vince Santini, died on 30 January 2024, aged 63. He had been suffering from chronic lung disease.

== Post-Rezillos/Revillos careers ==
- Eugene Reynolds (Alan Forbes) has a successful business selling Indian motorcycles. As a child he had been fascinated with the motorcycle brand ever since seeing them being ridden on the US airbase near his home in East Anglia, and later set up an import business that helped pay for his studies in Edinburgh. After the Revillos split up he registered the name of the Indian brand in the UK and created a new version of the Indian 4 motorcycle. He also briefly formed a post-Revillos band named Planet Pop.
- Fay Fife (Sheilagh Hynd) took a post-graduate acting course at Welsh College of Music and Drama in Cardiff and appeared in Taggart and The Bill. She later retrained as a clinical psychologist at the University of Edinburgh. In 2016, she formed a new alt-country band named The Countess of Fife. This new band began a crowdfunding project for the recording of their debut album in late 2020.
- Alasdair "Angel" Paterson completed his architecture degree in Brighton. While on an exchange visit to Bremen he met a German woman whom he later married, moving to Hilgermissen and setting up an architect practice.
- Mark Sinclair "Hi Fi" Harris resumed his studies and became an architect.
- David "Dr D.K." Smythe returned to his career as a research geophysicist, and became Professor of Geophysics at the University of Glasgow in 1988. Following his early retirement from the university in 1998 he concentrated musically for about 15 years on singing Lieder and other art song as a tenor, and took up bass playing again after his move to France. Currently he plays a fretless Jazz Bass in a local 7-piece orchestre (rock/pop group) Les Bon'z'enfants, and double bass in the jazz workshop combos and in the Big Band at the local conservatoire.
- Alastair Donaldson (William Mysterious) played bass on the Revillos' third single before returning to complete his architecture studies at University of Hull. While in Hull he released a solitary single titled "Security of Noise" on his own Mezzanine label in 1982, under the name William Mysterious & Alastair Donaldson. The single features Fay Fife and the Revettes on backing vocals. After finishing his degree he returned to work as an architect in Edinburgh, as well as playing occasional low-key solo gigs in the city. He died on 18 June 2013, aged 58.
- Simon Bloomfield (Simon Templar) has since worked with Swedish singer and actor Thomaz and pursued a career in sociology.
- Nicky Forbes (Rocky Rhythm) maintains the official Revillos website and wrote an account of his time in the Revillos, The Rhythm Method, published as a book in 2008. The book launch was promoted by a one-off performance by the surviving key members of the Revillos rhythm section—Rocky Rhythm, Vince Santini and Max Atom—at the 12 Bar Club in Denmark Street, London on 10 June 2008, with Eugene Reynolds making a guest appearance on vocals. Forbes plays in punk band The Pork Dukes (under the name Bonk), as well as self-described "glammabilly" (a mixture of glam rock and rockabilly) band The Roadholders.
- Jon McLoughlin (Kid Krupa) formed a funk rock band called 2 Tribes, and was a member of Scottish band Del Amitri between 1996 and 1997, playing guitar on their 1997 album Some Other Sucker's Parade. He died in March 2005, aged 41, from complications with diabetes.
- Dennis Schiavon (Vince Santini) joined The Pork Dukes alongside Forbes in 2008, as well as playing and working for music charities in Hereford.
- Trevor Sewell (Max Atom) became a lecturer at Northumbria University as well as playing in his own blues band, The Trevor Sewell Band, Trevor Sewell is a Multi Award-winning artist having twice won The Hollywood Music In Media Awards in the category 'Best Blues' 2011 and 2013 and twice won The Artists In Music Awards [Los Angeles] in the category 'Best Blues Artist' in 2013 and 2014. He continues to release music. At the time of writing his latest offering is the album 'Independence’ - released on 21 November 2013.
- Johnny Brady (Johnny Terminator) plays in the band Johnny 7.

== Discography ==
=== The Rezillos ===
==== Albums ====
| Year | Title | Peak UK chart position |
|---|---|---|
| 1978 | Can't Stand the Rezillos: Released: 21 July 1978; Label: Sire Records; Format: LP, cassette | 16 |
| 1979 | Mission Accomplished ... But the Beat Goes On: Released: 13 April 1979; Label: Sire Records; Format: LP, cassette | 30 |
| 1993 | Can't Stand The Rezillos: The (Almost) Complete Rezillos: Released: 1993; Label: Sire Records; Format: LP, cassette, CD | - |
| 2015 | Zero: Released: 10 March 2015; Label: Metropolis Records; Format: LP | - |
| 2026 | Psycho Tornado: Released: 25 September 2026; Label: Last Night From Glasgow; Format: LP, CD | - |

- Can't Stand the Rezillos was reissued in an expanded form on CD on 23 March 1993 as Can't Stand the Rezillos: The (Almost) Complete Rezillos, consisting of the original album, the single "Destination Venus" and its B-side, and the whole of Mission Accomplished ... But the Beat Goes On with the exception of its final track.

==== Singles ====
| Year | Single | Peak UK chart position | Album | Line-up |
|---|---|---|---|---|
| 1977 | "I Can't Stand My Baby" | — | Can't Stand the Rezillos | Jo Callis aka Luke Warm (guitar), Fay Fife (vocals), Hi-Fi Harris (guitar), Angel Paterson (drums), Eugene Reynolds (vocals), Dr. D.K. Smythe (bass) |
| 1977 | "(My Baby Does) Good Sculptures" | — | Can't Stand the Rezillos | Callis (guitar), Fife (vocals), William Mysterious (bass), Paterson (drums), Reynolds (vocals) |
| 1978 | "Top of the Pops" | 17 | Can't Stand the Rezillos | Callis (guitar), Fife (vocals), Paterson (drums), Reynolds (vocals), Simon Templar (bass) |
| 1978 | "Destination Venus" | 43 | non-album single | Callis (guitar), Fife (vocals), Paterson (drums), Reynolds (vocals), Simon Templar (bass) |
| 1979 | "Cold Wars" (live) | — | Mission Accomplished ... But the Beat Goes On | Callis (guitar), Fife (vocals), Mysterious (saxophone), Paterson (drums), Reynolds (vocals), Templar (bass), Gail Warning (backing vocals) |
| 1979 | "I Wanna Be Your Man"/"I Can't Stand My Baby" (re-issue) | 71 | Can't Stand the Rezillos | Callis (guitar), Fife (vocals), Harris (guitar), Paterson (drums), Reynolds (vocals), Smythe (bass) |
| 2009 | "No 1 Boy" | — | non-album single (download only) | Chris Agnew (bass), Callis (guitar), Fife (vocals), Paterson (drums), Reynolds (vocals) |
| 2011 | "Out of This World" | — | non-album single | Agnew (bass), Jim Brady (guitar), Callis (guitar), Fife (vocals), Paterson (drums), Reynolds (vocals), Johnny Terminator (bass) |
| 2012 | "Top of the Pops" (live) | — | non-album single | Agnew (bass), Brady (guitar), Fife (vocals), Paterson (drums), Reynolds (vocals) |
| 2026 | "Cranium" | — | Psycho Tornado | Agnew (bass), Fife (vocals), Marx (guitar), Molleson (drums), Reynolds (vocals) |

=== The Revillos ===
==== Albums ====
Studio albums

- Rev Up (Snatzo/Dindisc, 1980)
- Attack! (Superville, 1982 – withdrawn shortly after release, reissued in expanded form on Captain Oi!, 2002)

Live albums

- Live and on Fire in Japan (Vinyl Japan, 1994)
- Totally Alive (Sympathy for the Record Industry, 1998)

Compilation albums

- Attack of the Giant Revillos (Receiver Records, 1995)
- From the Freezer (Damaged Goods, 1996)
- Jungle of Eyes (Captain Oi!, 2003)

==== Singles ====
| Year | Single | Peak UK chart position | Album | Line-up |
|---|---|---|---|---|
| 1979 | "Where's the Boy for Me?" | — | non-album single | Felix (bass), Fife (vocals), Harris (guitar), Reynolds (vocals), Rocky Rhythm^{†} (drums), Cherie and Babs (backing vocals) |
| 1980 | "Motor Bike Beat" | 45 | Rev Up | Felix (bass), Fife (vocals), Harris (guitar), Reynolds (vocals), Rhythm^{†} (drums), Jane Brown, Tricia Bryce, Jane White (backing vocals) |
| 1980 | "Scuba Scuba" | — | non-album single | Fife (vocals), Harris (guitar), Mysterious (bass), Reynolds (vocals), Rhythm (drums), Cherie and Babs (backing vocals) |
| 1980 | "Hungry for Love" | — | Rev Up | Fife (vocals), Kid Krupa (guitar), Reynolds (vocals), Rhythm (drums), Smythe (bass – uncredited), Cherie and Babs (backing vocals) |
| 1981 | "She's Fallen in Love with a Monster Man" | — | non-album single | Fife (vocals), Krupa (guitar), Reynolds (vocals), Rhythm (drums), Vince Santini^{‡} (bass), Cherie and Drax (backing vocals) |
| 1981 | "Bongo Brain" | — | non-album single | Fife (vocals), Krupa (guitar), Reynolds (vocals), Rhythm (drums), Vince Santini^{‡} (bass), Cherie and Drax (backing vocals) |
| 1981 | "Santa Claus Is Comin' to Town!"^{#} | — | non-album single | unknown |
| 1982 | "Tell Him" | — | Attack! | Max Atom (guitar), Fife (vocals), Reynolds (vocals), Rhythm (drums), Santini (bass), Cherie and Terri (backing vocals) |
| 1983 | "Bitten by a Love Bug" | — | Attack! | Max Atom (guitar), Fife (vocals), Reynolds (vocals), Rhythm (drums), Santini (bass), Cherie and Terri (backing vocals) |
| 1984 | "Midnight" | — | Attack! | Max Atom (guitar), Fife (vocals), Reynolds (vocals), Rhythm (drums), Santini (bass), Cherie and Terri (backing vocals) |
| 1994 | "Yeah Yeah" | — | Live and on Fire in Japan | Fife (vocals), Krupa (guitar), Mekon (bass), Reynolds (vocals), Rhythm (drums), Frankie and Polly (backing vocals) |
| 1996 | "Jack the Ripper" | — | From the Freezer | Fife (vocals), Harris (guitar), Reynolds (vocals, bass), Rhythm (drums), Cherie, Jane Brown, Jane White (backing vocals) |
| 1998 | "4 track E.P." | — | Totally Alive (first two tracks only) | Fife (vocals), George (guitar), Hymo (keyboards), Mekon (bass), Reynolds (vocals, guitar, saxophone), Rhythm (drums), Frankie and Polly (backing vocals) |

- ^{†} Rocky Rhythm is credited as "Robo Rhythm" on the first two Revillos singles
- ^{‡} Vince Santini is credited as "Vince Spik" on "She's Fallen in Love with a Monster Man"
- ^{#} Released under the alias "The Mysteroids"

== See also ==
- List of 1970s punk rock musicians
- List of punk bands from the United Kingdom
- List of Peel sessions
- List of performers on Top of the Pops
