= Peter Smith (American businessman) =

American businessperson

- Born: c. 1989 (age 36–37); United States
- Education: University of London
- Occupation: Businessperson
- Known for: Co-founder, Blockchain.com
- Title: CEO & Executive Chairman, Blockchain.com

Peter Smith is an American businessperson best known for co-founding cryptocurrency financial services company Blockchain.com.

== Early life and education ==
Smith was born in the United States. He attended graduate school at the University of London, studying economics.

== Career ==
After graduating, Smith worked in international finance, finding roles in the Middle East, Eastern Africa, and Singapore. Through those roles, Smith explored how cryptocurrency (specifically Bitcoin) would improve international banking systems through the expansion of economic freedoms across borders, granting individuals the ability to transfer currency across the world. He was given his first bitcoin by Gavin Andresen in 2011.

In 2011, Smith co-founded Blockchain.com, a cryptocurrency financial services company, alongside Nicolas Cary and Ben Reeves. In 2014, he became the company's CEO. Smith is also executive chairman of Blockchain.com’s board. The three founders, Reeves, Cary and Smith, worked from Reeves' flat in York and formally established the company. By October 2014, the company had 2.3 million consumer wallets and raised $30.5 million in its first external fundraising round. This was the biggest round of financing in the digital currency sector at that time.

In 2017, Smith joined the UK Finance Board, a trade association for the banking and financial services sector. He left the role in 2020 upon the expiration of his contract with the association.

In 2023, Smith spoke at the Qatar Economic Forum, focusing on the future of cryptocurrencies.

In 2026, Smith was named a member of the United States Commodity Futures Trading Commission's Innovation Advisory Committee. Later in the year, Smith appeared on Maria Bartiromo’s Fox Business show, Mornings with Maria, and advocated for the passing of the Digital Asset Market Clarity (CLARITY) Act of 2025. In that same year, Smith would meet with President Donald Trump at the White House, along with other cryptocurrency exchange executives, to discuss the Clarity Act.

== Personal life ==
Smith met fellow Blockchain.com co-founders, Nicolas Cary and Ben Reeves, online through their shared interest in bitcoin.
