= Alastair Donaldson =

Scottish multi-instrumentalist (1955–2013)

Alastair Donaldson (27 April 1955, in Edinburgh – 18 June 2013, in Edinburgh) was a Scottish multi-instrumentalist, and was the bassist for the Scottish punk/pop band the Rezillos, for whom he played under the stage name of William Mysterious.

He was a formative member of the folk ensemble Silly Wizard prior to his involvement with the Rezillos, and appears on many of their recordings under his real name. He appears on the Rezillos' second single for Sire Records, featuring the songs "(My Baby Does) Good Sculptures" and "Flying Saucer Attack" and also on their debut studio album Can't Stand the Rezillos (1978). He took over the bass slot in the Rezillos whilst working as their saxophonist. He left the Rezillos after a UK tour supporting the Ramones, although he did make a guest appearance at the Rezillos' final gig at the Glasgow Apollo, where he returned to his original role of saxophone player alongside his replacement on bass guitar, Simon Templar (born Simon Broomfield). This performance was captured on the Rezillos' live album, Mission Accomplished (But the Beat Goes On) (1979). He also appeared on the B-side of the single version of "Top of the Pops", playing saxophone on the instrumental track, "20,000 Rezillos under the Sea". This track itself was a re-imagining of the William Tell Overture by the classical composer Gioachino Rossini.

After leaving the Rezillos, he released one single in 1982 as William Mysterious with Alastair Donaldson on the independent Mezzanine label, "Security of Noise" b/w "Alright". After The Rezillos split up for the first time in 1978, former members became the Revillos, and Donaldson rejoined them in 1979 for the Rev Up LP where he once again played bass.

After this final outing with the Rezillos he retired from recording and touring, but was still semi active in live work in his native Edinburgh up until his death on 18 June 2013. He is survived by a daughter, Ailsa, and a son, John, as well as his wife Ksenija Horvat.
