= Omio =

Online travel agency platform

Omio GmbH
- Type: Travel website
- Founded: 2013; 13 years ago
- Founder: Naren Shaam
- Headquarters: Berlin, Germany
- Website: omio.com

Omio is a German online travel agency and multimodal travel booking platform headquartered in Berlin. Founded by Naren Shaam and launched as GoEuro, it enables users to search, compare and book rail, bus and coach, air and ferry travel.

The company adopted the Omio name in 2019 as part of an expansion beyond its original European market. Later that year, Omio acquired the multimodal journey-planning service Rome2Rio, which continues to operate as a separate brand. Omio also operates a B2B distribution business that provides transport inventory to third-party platforms.

== History ==
Indian-born entrepreneur Naren Shaam, a 2012 Harvard Business School MBA graduate, founded the company in 2013 under the name GoEuro. Initially focused on German and British rail and bus data, the platform rapidly expanded to cover 500 operators in 36 European countries by 2018.

In 2019, the website rebranded itself as Omio and acquired the Australian travel website Rome2rio.

In January 2020, Omio expanded to Canada and the United States.

=== COVID-19 contraction and recovery (2020–2022) ===
The COVID-19 pandemic cut Omio’s revenues by 98 percent in March 2020, leading to large-scale furloughs and a switch to “keep-the-lights-on” operations.

== Recent developments ==
In 2024, Omio partnered with Companjon to offer Omio Flex, allowing users to cancel journey tickets up to two hours before departure time.

== Business model and services ==
Omio aggregates schedules, fares and seat inventories from rail, coach, air and ferry operators, normalising disparate data sets into a single search interface.

Omio employs more than 300 people and is active in 37 countries globally.

The website is available in 21 languages. It offers travelers the ability to organize transportation requirements such as trains, planes, buses, etc by using their easy-to-use platform. It covers 207 European airports, over ten thousand central bus stations, and over twenty thousand train stations.

== Funding and valuation ==
Since launch Omio has raised roughly US$480 million in venture financing from investors including Temasek, Kinnevik, Goldman Sachs and NEA. Major rounds include a US$150 million Series C in 2018, the US$100 million convertible note in 2020, and the US$80 million Series E in 2022.

In June 2022, it resumed full operations as intra-European ground travel began to rebound.

== See also ==
- Expedia
- Orbitz
- Rome2Rio
- Trainline
- Trip.com
- Mobility as a service
