= The Users (band) =

- Origin: Cambridge, England
- Genre: Punk
- Years active: 1976–1979
- Labels: Raw Records, Warped Records, England In June, Damaged Goods, Bin Liner (Detour Records)
- Past members: James "James" Haight; Chris "Panic" Free; Andrew Bor; Bobby Kwok; Pete Bevington; Rick Tucker; Alvin Gibbs

The Users were an English punk rock band formed in Cambridge, England, that was active between 1977 and 1979.

== History ==
In 1977, Cambridge record dealer Lee Wood founded Raw Records. Wood began recording with The Users in March of the same year, releasing the single "Sick of You" / "(I'm) In Love With Today" on May 5, 1977. Sounds magazine commented of the single that it "burns into your brain without compromise."

Despite releasing only two singles and being active for less than three years, the band developed a lasting cult following. BBC Radio 1 DJ John Peel placed their first single, "Sick of You," in his chosen Festive Fifty chart of 1977. After Peel's death, it was revealed that he'd kept it as part of his favourite singles of all time. The single was later reissued in 1999 and 2006 by Damaged Goods.

Guitarist Chris Free, also the writer of Tracie Young's 1983 hit single, "Give It Some Emotion," now writes for and performs with The Sound Of Pop Art.

The drummer's^{[who?]} son Sean Patrick O’Hanrahan is now the keyboardist for Max Bianco & The Blue Hearts.

Bass player Rick Tucker became a lead for mental health nursing in secure environments before returning to music and becoming a novelist. His album, Paint the Blue Grass Green, is available online. His novels, A Dog Unchained and Under the Flamboyant Tree, both set in Trinidad and Tobago, have gained him a wider audience.^{[source?]}

In October 2008, a discography compilation, Secondary Modern: 1976-1979, was released on Bin Liner records (part of Detour Records).

In 2007, Spin magazine named "Sick of You" one of the 20 best singles of 1977 by bands who not yet released an album. Jello Biafra of Dead Kennedys has cited the single as one of his favorite singles in terms of production when his band recorded 1980's Fresh Fruit for Rotting Vegetables.

== Discography ==
=== Singles ===
- "Sick of You" / "(I'm) in Love With Today" 7" (1977, Raw Records) (Reissued 2006, Damaged Goods)
- "Kicks in Style" / "Dead On Arrival" 7" (1978, Warped Records) (Reissued 2010, 1977 Records)
- "Now That It's Over" / "Listen" 7" (2018, Love Child Records)

=== Albums and EPs ===
- Secondary Modern 1976-1979 CD, (2008, Bin Liner Records)
- Kicks In Style (2012, Rave Up Records) 12" vinyl
- Lo-Fi EP, (2012, Rave Up Records) 7" vinyl
