= Peter Smith (Scottish footballer) =

Scottish footballer

Personal information
- Date of birth: 18 July 1937 (age 89)
- Place of birth: Scotland
- Position: Defender

Senior career*
Years	Team	Apps	(Gls)
1957–1959	Heart of Midlothian	0	(0)
- → Livingston United (loan)
1959–1960	Dundee United	18	(2)
1960–1969	Alloa Athletic	239	(61)
- * Club domestic league appearances and goals

Peter Smith (born 18 July 1937) is a Scottish former footballer who played as a defender. Beginning his career with Heart of Midlothian, Smith failed to make an appearance and moved to Dundee United in 1959, spending a single season at Tannadice. In 1960, Smith moved to Alloa, where he made around 300 appearances for The Wasps before being released in 1969. One of his most notable performances for Alloa was in the 1961–62 season against Queens Park. Losing 2–5 at half-time, Smith was moved from right back to centre forward and scored a second-half hat-trick. Alloa won the match 7–5.
