= Peter Smith (biologist) =

Scottish climate change scientist

Pete Smith FRS FRSB FRSE
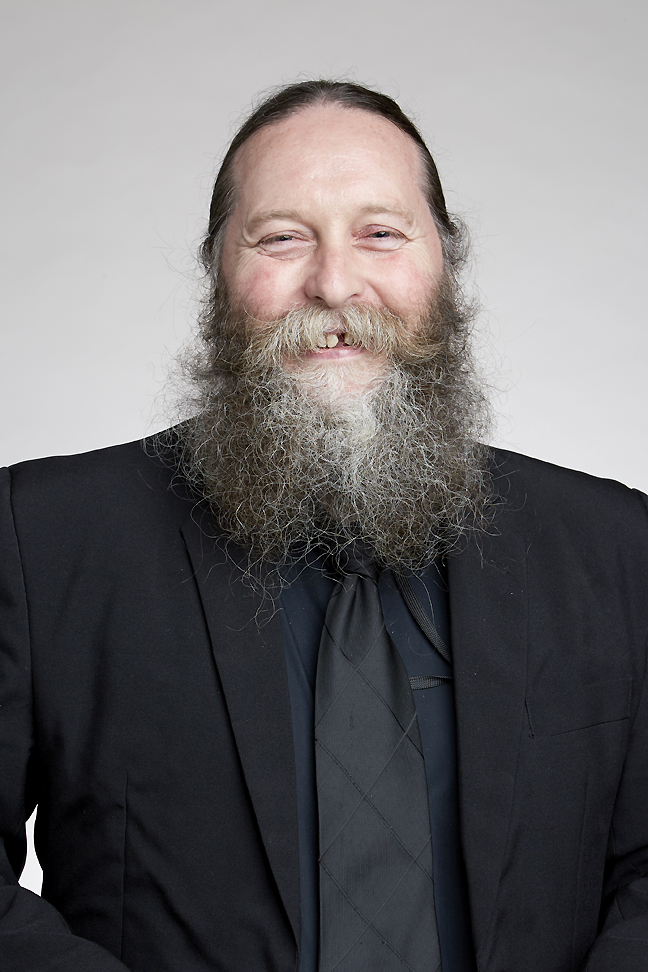
- Smith in 2017
- Born: Peter Smith
- Awards: Royal Society Wolfson Research Merit Award (2008); Philippe Duchaufour Medal (2017)
- Scientific career
- Fields: Soils; Carbon; Global change; Climate change; Climate change mitigation
- Workplaces: University of Aberdeen; MAFF Central Science Laboratory; Rothamsted Research
- Website: www.abdn.ac.uk/people/pete.smith

Pete Smith is a Scottish climate change scientist who is Professor of Soils and Global change at the University of Aberdeen where he directs the Scottish Climate Change Centre of Expertise, ClimateXChange.

== Research and career ==
Smith's research investigates global change, soils, carbon sequestration, climate change and climate change mitigation. Since 1996, he has served as convening lead author, lead author and author for part of the IPCC Fourth Assessment Report published by the Intergovernmental Panel on Climate Change, which was awarded the 2007 Nobel Peace Prize. He is a global ecosystem modeller with interests in agriculture, food security, bioenergy, greenhouse gases and greenhouse gas removal technologies.

His research has been funded by the Biotechnology and Biological Sciences Research Council (BBSRC), European Union, the Hadley Centre for Climate Prediction and Research, the Department for Environment, Food and Rural Affairs (Defra), the Natural Environment Research Council (NERC), the Scottish Executive Environment and Rural Affairs Department (SEERAD), the Cruickshank Trust Fund, the World Bank, the Met Office, the International Fertilizer Industry Association, the Department of Energy and Climate Change (DECC), Unilever, the Hewlett Foundation, the United Nations Environment Programme (UNEP), Food and Agriculture Organization (FAO), Greenpeace International, the Royal Society of Edinburgh, the Scottish Government, the UK Energy Research Centre (UKERC), the James Hutton Institute and the Welsh Government.

=== Awards and honours ===
Smith held a prestigious Royal Society Wolfson Research Merit Award from 2008 to 2013 and has been a Fellow of the Royal Society of Biology since 2008 and a Fellow of the Institute of Soil Scientists since 2015. He was elected a Fellow of the Royal Society of Edinburgh (FRSE) in 2009, awarded the British Ecological Society Marsh Award for Climate Change Research in 2014 and the Philippe Duchaufour Medal from the European Geosciences Union for ‘distinguished contributions to soil science’ in 2017. He was also a research fellow at Rothamsted Research from 2010 to 2015 and elected a Fellow of the Royal Society (FRS) in 2017.
