= Handcream for a Generation =

2002 studio album by Cornershop

Studio album by Cornershop
- Released: 1 April 2002
- Recorded: 2000–2001
- Studios: West Orange (Preston); Eastcote (Ladbroke Grove)
- Genres: Punjabi rock; electro-funk
- Length: 60:52
- Label: Wiiija
- Producers: Tjinder Singh; Rob Swift

Cornershop chronology
When I Was Born for the 7th Time (1997)	Handcream for a Generation (2002)	Judy Sucks a Lemon for Breakfast (2009)

Singles from Handcream for a Generation
- 1. "Lessons Learned from Rocky I to Rocky III" Released: 4 March 2002; 2. "Staging" Released: 19 August 2002

Handcream for a Generation is the fourth studio album by British rock band Cornershop. It was released on 1 April 2002 through Wiiija. Following the release of their third studio album When I Was Born for the 7th Time (1997), the band abstained from touring for the majority of 1998. During their hiatus, frontman Tjinder Singh and guitarist Ben Ayres worked as disc jockeys (DJs), formed the side project Clinton and released an album under that moniker while Singh was suffering from fatigue. Between mid-2000 and June 2001, Cornershop recorded their next album at West Orange Studios in Preston, Lancashire, and Eastcote Studios in Ladbroke Grove, London. Singh produced the album and Rob Swift co-produced two of the songs.

Handcream for a Generation recounts the Punjabi rock of When I Was Born for the 7th Time and the electro-funk of Clinton's sole album. One critic considered it a concept album about Singh's dismissal with the way modern music is consumed. Throughout it, the guitar tone recalls the sound of Oasis member Noel Gallagher; the music overall includes Punjabi instrumentation such as sitar and tabla. The individual songs on the album vary in genre from the soul-funk of opener and closer "Heavy Soup" and the Daft Punk-aping disco house of "Music Plus 1" to the psychedelic number "Spectral Mornings" and the dance sound of "Slip the Drummer One".

Music critics, many of whom commented on the array of musical styles, gave Handcream for a Generation generally favourable reviews. The album reached number 30 on the UK Albums Chart, while "Lessons Learned from Rocky I to Rocky III" peaked at number 37 and "Staging" peaked at number 80 on the UK Singles Chart. In March 2002, "Lessons Learned from Rocky I to Rocky III" was released as the album's lead single, after which Cornershop toured the United Kingdom and the United States until May that year. After Cornershop appeared at the festivals Fleadh Nua and Summer Sundae, and supported Oasis at a one-off show, "Staging the Plaguing of the Raised Platform" was released as the album's second single under the title "Staging" in August 2002. To promote the single, Cornershop performed at the Reading and Leeds Festivals but by October 2002, their record label had released the band from their contract.

== Background and recording ==
Cornershop released their third studio album When I Was Born for the 7th Time in September 1997. Its lead single "Brimful of Asha" (1997) became a commercial success after it was remixed by Fatboy Slim, reaching number one in several territories. This led to a supporting slot for Oasis on their headlining US tour. In 1998, Cornershop took a break from touring for most of the year, though in July they appeared at some European festivals. Also in 1998, they released remixes of "Good Shit" and "Candyman" as vinyl-only singles. During the band's hiatus, frontman Tjinder Singh and guitarist Ben Ayres worked as DJs for some venues and radio stations.

Singh and Ayres spent some time working on their funk side-project Clinton, and started their own record label Meccio Records, on which they released music by artists they liked. Clinton released their debut studio album Disco and the Halfway to Discontent in January 2000. Singh said he was suffering from fatigue and was dealing with personal issues. Around this time, Cornershop left their American label Luaka Bop, which had switched distribution from Warner Bros. Records to Virgin Records. Singh said the label was going through a restructuring process, which he did not want to deal with. In June 2000, Cornershop were rehearsing guitar-led material for the next album, and had finished four songs by this point.

Handcream for a Generation was recorded at West Orange Studios in Preston, Lancashire, and Eastcote Studios in Ladbroke Grove, London, between mid-2000 and June 2001, with Singh as producer. The band would alternate between these studios, spending a few days at each. They would play the songs while driving on the motorway, which helped them come up with new ideas. Rob Swift of the X-Ecutioners co-produced and mixed "Wogs Will Walk" and "Slip the Drummer One"; Singh said Swift was "very simplistic, no messing about, just getting to a groove". Singh wanted songs that worked well in a live setting, which meant recording a bass guitar for the first time. Partway through the sessions, Singh's father died and Singh's wife gave birth to their first child. Alan Gregson and Philip Bagenal served as executive engineers; and Mike Marsh mastered the album at The Exchange.

== Composition and lyrics ==
Handcream for a Generation returns to the Punjabi rock of When I Was Born for the 7th Time and the electro-funk of Clinton's sole album. Singh said he came up with the album's title two years earlier and used it as a lyric in two of the songs. Matt Cibula of PopMatters referred to it as a concept album that was "made to express Singh's disapproval of the way modern music is handled". AllMusic reviewer Stephen Thomas Erlewine said throughout the album, Singh borrows the guitar sound of Oasis member Noel Gallagher "and winds up with a record that is hipper, looser, and funkier than [Oasis'] Be Here Now, but weirdly reminiscent of it all the same". Los Angeles Times' Natalie Nichols noted Cornershop had "always fused disparate elements", this time expanding on the sound of their last album with "such Punjabi staples as sitar and tabla, along with squiggly electronica, vampy glam-rock, funk riffs, dub reggae, soul grooves and more".

The album opens with the soul-funk of "Heavy Soup", on which Otis Clay is the MC, backed by Memphis-styled horns. Julian Argüelles played bass clarinet, Ian Hooper played keyboards and Mick Greenwood played trumpet. "Staging the Plaguing of the Raised Platform", which features a children's choir, and strings and bass played by West Orange Studios owner Alan Gregson, comes across as a remake of "Brimful of Asha". "Music Plus 1" copies the disco house sound of Daft Punk, and blends dance beats, techno, electro-funk and jangly guitar work. For "Lessons Learned from Rocky I to Rocky III", Singh compared learning lessons from the Rocky film series to learning about the music industry. The lyrics include comments on the nu metal trend and the state of the music industry, which Singh said was "saddening to see what has happened to it – for it to be more manufactured, to see more managers running it, to see less artistry". The song features Paul McGuigan of Oasis on bass, and its rhythm is reminiscent of "Rocks" (1994) by Primal Scream.

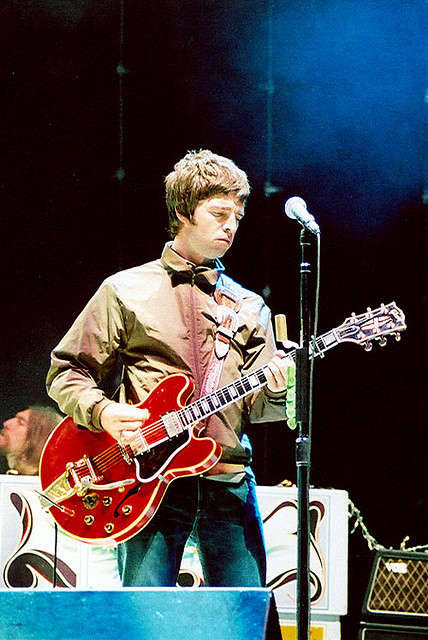
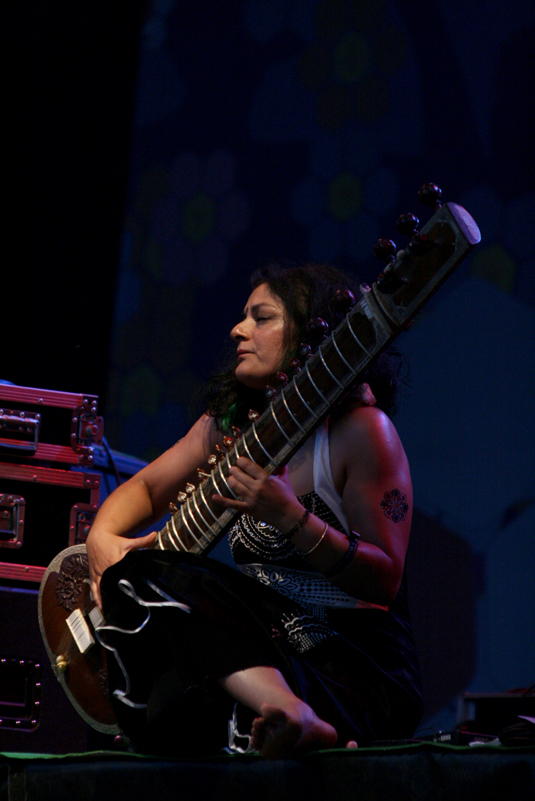
Noel Gallagher (left) and Sheema Mukherjee (right) played guitar and sitar, respectively, on the 14-minute long track "Spectral Mornings".

"Wogs Will Walk" evokes Cornershop's early songs, especially the material on their early extended plays (EPs), with its garage-soul organ, electronic sounds and chanted vocals that are fed through a boombox; it drew comparisons to There's a Riot Goin' On (1971) by Sly and the Family Stone. Scratching from Swift interrupts a repeating, two-note organ pattern that is heard throughout. "Motion the 11" is a roots reggae song, with elements of Punjabi music that is accompanied by Greenwood on flugelhorn, Gregson on bass and Doreen Edwards on vocals. It opens with Rastafari chanting from London-based reggae toasters Jack Wilson and Kojak of the Nazralites. "People Power" is cover of the Clinton song of the same name, set to Orange Juice-esque music. "Sounds Super Recordings" is a faux-radio advertisement detailing the death of an Indian musician, with tabla and breakbeats.

"The London Radar" is an audio collage of clipped speech, which recites aeroplane protocols, recalling Daft Punk's sound and the work of the Chemical Brothers. "Spectral Mornings" is a 14-minute psychedelic song, which channels the 1960s work of the Grateful Dead and George Harrison. The song, which attempts to recall "7:20am Jullandar Shere" from the band's second studio album Woman's Gotta Have It (1995), features Sheema Mukherjee on sitar and Gallagher on guitar. When touring with Oasis, Gallagher would perform with Cornershop and wanted to collaborate with them. A failed attempt occurred when Clinton was working on their debut while Gallagher was working on an Oasis album. The first demo of "Spectral Mornings" ran for 40 minutes; Singh said it "would have been longer, but the tape ran out". "Slip the Drummer One" is a dance track that includes scratching sounds from Swift. The album concludes with a reprise of "Heavy Soup".

== Release and promotion ==
In August 2001, Cornershop released "Motion the 11" on a promotional seven-inch vinyl record after a DJ set in London. On 8 January 2002, Handcream for a Generation was announced for release in three months and its track listing was posted online. "Lessons Learned from Rocky I to Rocky III" was made available for streaming through Dotmusic's website on 1 February 2002. Later that month, the band were expected to preview songs from the forthcoming album at a performance at Scala Theatre, London. The day before the show, a continuously changing remix of "Spectral Mornings" was posted on the band's website.

"Lessons Learned from Rocky I to Rocky III" was released as the album's lead single on 4 March 2002. Two versions were released on CD; the first includes "Returning from the Wreckage" and a remix of "Lessons Learned from Rocky I to Rocky III" by Osymyso, while the second includes remixes of "Lessons Learned from Rocky I to Rocky III" by Midfield General and Detroit Grand Pubahs. The music video for "Lessons Learned from Rocky I to Rocky III" was directed by Douglas Avery, based on an idea from Singh, and filmed in South Africa. It follows a rock star as he performs on a stage, as well as being in a hot tub, riding an airplane and unwinding in a hotel room. All of the remixes were released on 12-inch singles; two for the UK and one for the US.

Handcream for a Generation was released on 1 April 2002 through Wiiija; the album was intended to be promoted with a UK tour the same month, and a US tour that was expected to last until the end of May. On 23 April 2002, the US edition was released through BMG and distributed by V2 Records. The following week, the band were announced to perform at the Coachella festival in the US. In May 2002, "Lessons Learned from Rocky I to Rocky III" was released to modern rock radio stations in the US. Before returning to the UK, Cornershop planned to perform at Fleadh Nua, a festival in Ireland. In July, the band were announced to support Oasis for one show in London, and were expected to co-headline the festival Summer Sundae.

"Staging the Plaguing of the Raised Platform" was released as single on 19 August 2002 under the title "Staging". Two versions were released on CD: the first included "Green P's" and the music video for "Lessons Learned from Rocky I to Rocky III", while the second CD included "Straight Aces", and remixes of "Staging" and "Motion the 11". In June, the band were expected to perform at Reading and Leeds Festivals. In October 2002, it was announced Wiiija had released Cornershop from their contract because of poor album sales; Singh later dismissed rumours Cornershop had disbanded.

== Reception ==
Professional ratings
Aggregate scores
Source	Rating
Metacritic	78/100
Review scores
Source	Rating
AllMusic	3.5/5 stars
Entertainment Weekly	B
The Guardian	4/5 stars
Los Angeles Times	3.5/4 stars
NME	8/10
Pitchfork	7.6/10
Q	4/5 stars
Rolling Stone	3.5/5 stars
Spin	6/10
The Village Voice	A

Music critics gave Handcream for a Generation a generally favourable reception. At Metacritic, which assigns a normalized rating out of 100 to reviews from mainstream publications, the album received an average score of 78 based on 23 reviews.

In a review for The Guardian, Alexis Petridis complimented the variety of musical styles, writing; "[w]hat should be an incoherent jumble is held together by sheer exuberance". Though akin to Sandinista! (1980) by the Clash, the album's "ambitions are occasionally overreaching", saying "Spectral Mornings" is "pushing it a bit" and "Slip the Drummer One" "meanders about in a directionless, potheaded haze". Nichols said while "these lush tracks may at any instant recall Booker T., the Velvet Underground, XTC, T. Rex or countless other acts, they're indisputably Cornershop". Tim Kessler of NME said the album "lifts the soul with a joyful infusion of psychedelic thinking and brilliant rhythmic cross-genre filching". Pitchfork contributor Rob Mitchum said with the album's "effortless genre-hopping and EPCOT cultural sampling, [it] is the most globalist musical statement" since the music video for "Black or White" (1991) by Michael Jackson.

David Fricke of Rolling Stone called the album "a festive crash of cultures, a Babel of loops and ethnic body language. Dixie R&B, Bollywood kitsch, Crooklyn hip-hop, Eurotrash electronics ... Singh shakes 'em up like rats in a box." Robert Christgau in The Village Voice praised Singh as someone who "comes to the idea of world music naturally" and described the album's mood as "[h]ow to be conscious and happy at the same time". Erlewine said while the album "all flows well", there is "no hiding that for all their political stances and past reputation, Cornershop doesn't really have all that much to say this time around". In a review for Spin, Josh Kun said it "often feels mapless", compared to the subdued nature of their previous album. Ian McCaleb and Brad Reno of Trouser Press said the album is a "very bad" sequel to Clinton's debut because it "focuses almost entirely on energetic grooves, proving that all the momentum in the world is worthless if it's not headed in a specific direction". Chart Attack writer Elizabeth Chorney-Booth criticized Cornershop for leaving "us waiting for nearly five years for something this mediocre" that had "too much filler".

Handcream for a Generation peaked at number 30 on the UK Albums Chart. "Lessons Learned from Rocky I to Rocky III" and "Staging the Plaguing of the Raised Platform" peaked at 37 and 80 on the UK Singles Chart, respectively.

== Track listing ==
All tracks are written by Tjinder Singh.

No.	Title	Length
1.	"Heavy Soup"	3:21
2.	"Staging the Plaguing of the Raised Platform"	4:35
3.	"Music Plus 1"	4:46
4.	"Lessons Learned from Rocky I to Rocky III"	4:24
5.	"Wogs Will Walk"	4:54
6.	"Motion the 11"	5:46
7.	"People Power"	3:54
8.	"Sounds Super Recordings"	1:30
9.	"The London Radar"	4:07
10.	"Spectral Mornings"	14:24
11.	"Slip the Drummer One"	3:42
12.	"Heavy Soup (Outro)"	2:13
13.	"Bonus Track (unofficially titled Blue Aquarius)"	3:16
Total length:		60:52

== Personnel ==
Personnel per booklet.

Cornershop

- Tjinder Singh – vocals, guitar, keyboard, turntables
- Ben Ayres – guitar, synthesizer
- Anthony Saffery – guitar
- Nick Simms – drums
- Peter Bengry – percussion

Production and design

- Tjinder Singh – producer
- Alan Gregson – executive engineer
- Philip Bagenal – executive engineer
- Mike Marsh – mastering
- Rob Swift – co-producer (track 5 and 11), mixing (track 5 and 11)
- Nick Edwards – artwork

Additional musicians

- Rob Swift – scratches (tracks 1, 5 and 11)
- Otis Clay – vocals (track 1)
- Julian Argüelles – bass clarinet (track 1)
- Ian Hooper – keyboards (track 1)
- Mick Greenwood – trumpet (track 1), flugelhorn (tracks 1 and 6)
- Paul McGuigan – bass (track 4)
- Alan Gregson – bass (tracks 2 and 6), Rhodes (track 13)
- Joy Ellison – violin (track 2)
- Grace Winder – violin (track 2)
- Richard Curran – violin (track 2)
- Penny Holt – cello (track 2)
- Lydia Jenkins – backing vocals (track 2)
- Saskia Hippolyte – backing vocals (track 2)
- Max Clayton-Cloves – backing vocals (track 2)
- Lydia Bakelmun – backing vocals (track 2)
- Imogen Bakelmun – backing vocals (track 2)
- Alice Clayton – backing vocals (track 2)
- Doreen Edwards – backing vocals (tracks 3, 4 and 6)
- Jack Wilson – vocals (track 6)
- Kojak – vocals (track 6)
- Sheema Mukherjee – sitar (track 10)
- Noel Gallagher – guitar (track 10)

== Charts ==
Chart performance for Handcream for a Generation
Chart (2002)	Peak position
UK Albums (Official Charts)	30
