= Hold On It's Easy =

Studio album by Cornershop
- Released: 2 February 2015
- Recorded: Sassy P Studios, London and West Orange Studios, Preston.
- Genre: Easy listening, pop, hip-hop
- Label: Ample Play
- Producer: Tjinder Singh

Cornershop chronology
Urban Turban (2012)	Hold On It's Easy (2015)	England Is a Garden (2020)

Hold On It's Easy is a 2015 studio album by the British band Cornershop. It consists of easy listening re-recordings of tracks from the band's 1994 album Hold On It Hurts, with the Elastic Big Band. Singer Tjinder Singh said of the album "There was also an element of humour about doing a very noisy Riot Grrrl album in an easy-listening format. It came about because over the years we have got to know many a different musician, so it made the whole thing possible."

== Reception ==
Uncut gave the album seven out of ten. The Guardian's Tim Jonze awarded it three stars out of five, calling it "a playful distraction". Mojo gave it six out of ten, stating "The results are at first comically unexpected, then intriguing." AllMusic writer Tim Sendra gave it three stars, calling it "something defiantly square...[a] complete deconstruction of one of their career highlights". Record Collector writer Jake Kennedy gave it two stars, calling it "perhaps the most bloody-minded thing they've done since [Hold On It Hurts]...one of Cornershops most difficult works, for all the wrong reasons".

== Track listing ==
All songs written by Tjinder Singh

1. "Jason Donovan/Tessa Sanderson"
2. "Kalluri's Radio"
3. "Reader's Wives"
4. "Change"
5. "The New York Minute"
6. "Born Disco; Died Heavy Metal"
7. "Counteraction"
8. "Where D'u Get Your Information"
9. "Tera Mera Pyar"
10. "You Always Said My Language Would Get Me Into Trouble"
