= All Ireland Fleadh - Marching Band Competition =

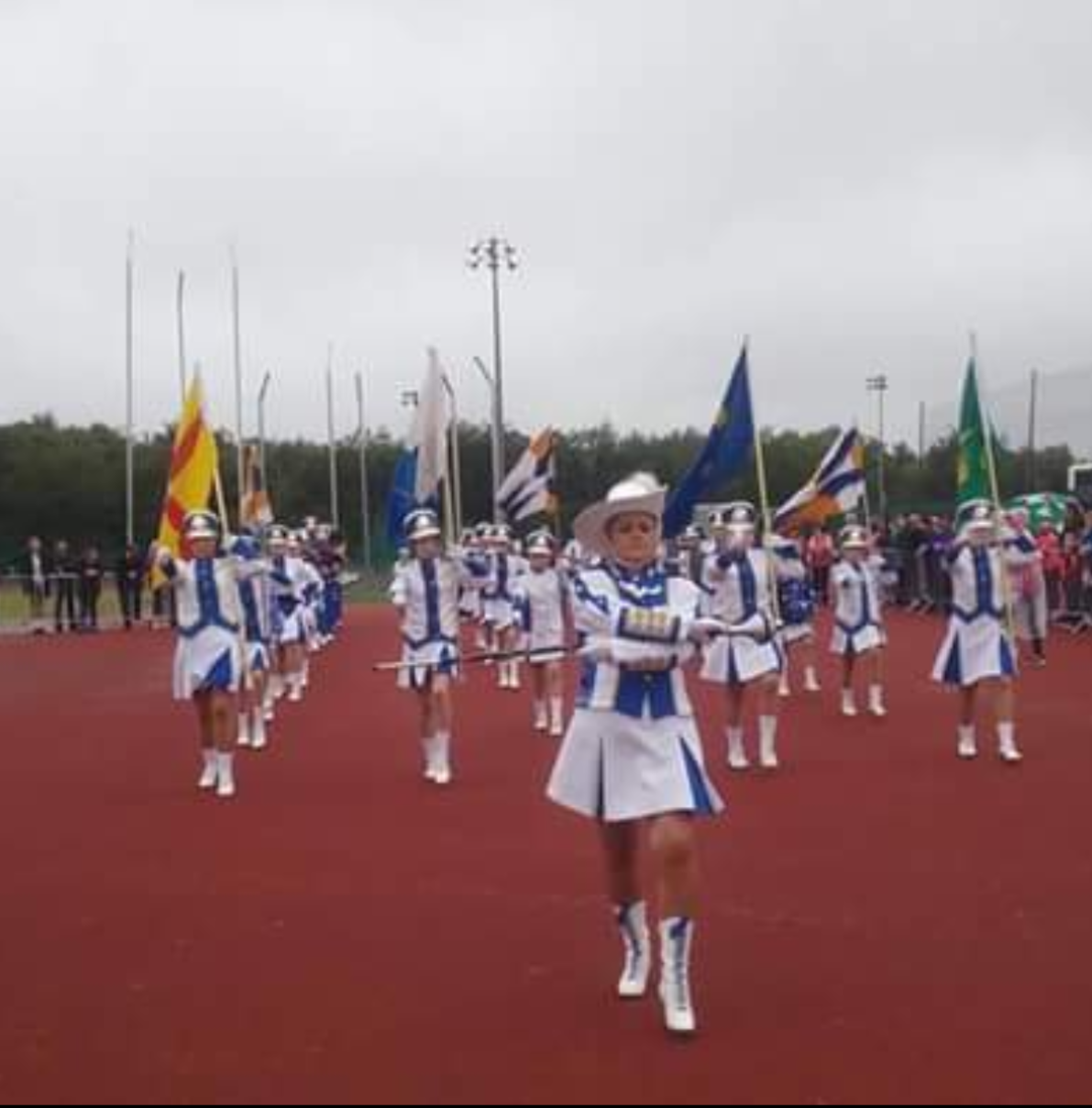
All Ireland Fleadh Marching Band Competitions

The All Ireland Fleadh takes place annually every year in different locations across Ireland. The marching bands competition is one of the many events that take place across a busy week at the Fleadh. The band competition takes place in an outdoor arena it must be 40 x 20 metres. After the results are announced, all the bands parade around the host town, showing off their silverware. Over the last two decades, the marching bands competition has seen a decline, 20 years ago there could have been 20-30 bands competing on the same day. Now it's seen as a good turnout if there are 10-12 bands. This has been mainly due to a lack of funding for these bands or unwillingness to compete at the Fleadh due to disagreements with the results. However, the competitions still remain competitive, especially in the Senior sections where any band could win and only one or two marks separate first and second place.

== Competition categories ==
There are several different sections in the competition, including:

- Junior Accordion
- Junior Miscellaneous
- Junior Flute
- Senior Accordion
- Senior Miscellaneous
- Senior Flute

== Adjudication ==
In each competition, there are 3 adjudicators. Each band is marked out of 100 marks, this is based on several aspects of their performance. They are: Drum major, Marching Drill, Music, Drumming and uniforms. Each band performs for 10 to 12 minutes they play a range of Irish traditional music including jigs, reels, polka, marches and slow airs. While they are in the arena they must also perform a marching drill routine, this allows each band to show off their marching skills but also be tested as the adjudicators watch very closely on their lines and turns. At the end of the competition, the marks are totalled for each band by the three judges and the winner is the band with the most points out of 100. Each section is marked separately so there is a winner in each section

== Qualification ==
Each band must compete at their county Fleadh and then the provincial Fleadh in order to qualify for the Fleadh Cheoil. In each qualification stage, the bands that place 1st and 2nd go through to the next stage. Occasionally, the adjudicators recommend one of the third-place competitors to go through to the next stage, if their performance was high enough. In the Senior competitions, the All Ireland winners from the previous year automatically qualify for the next year's All Ireland and so they do not have to compete at their county or provincial Fleadh. The majority of the marching bands now come from Ulster and it remains one of the only competitive provincial Fleadhs.

== Competition ==
=== Junior Accordion ===
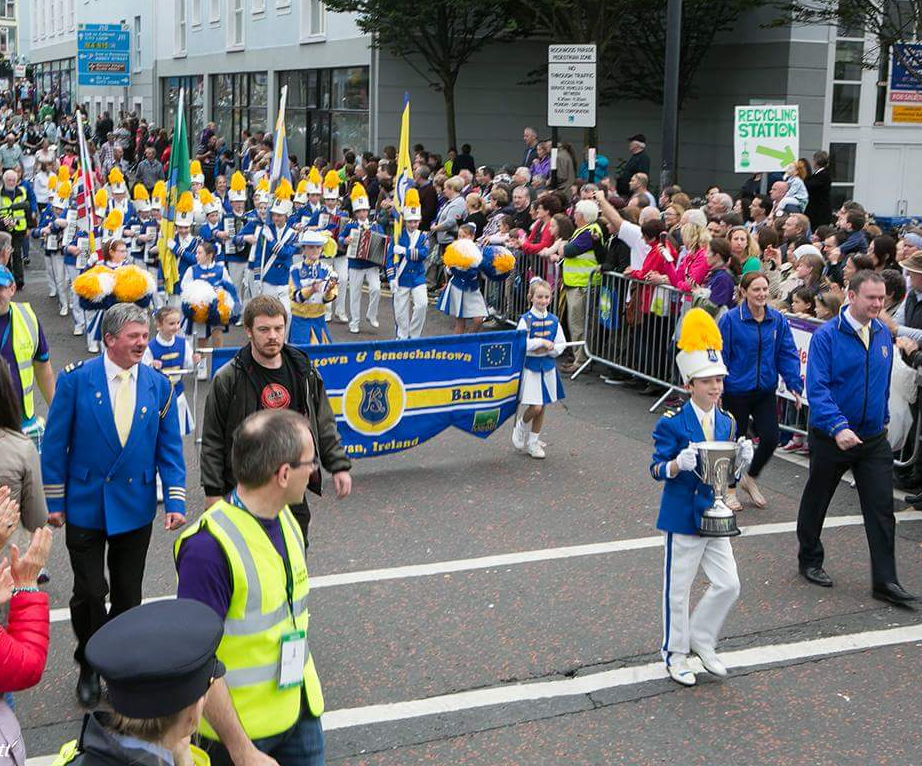
K and S Accordion Band County Meath

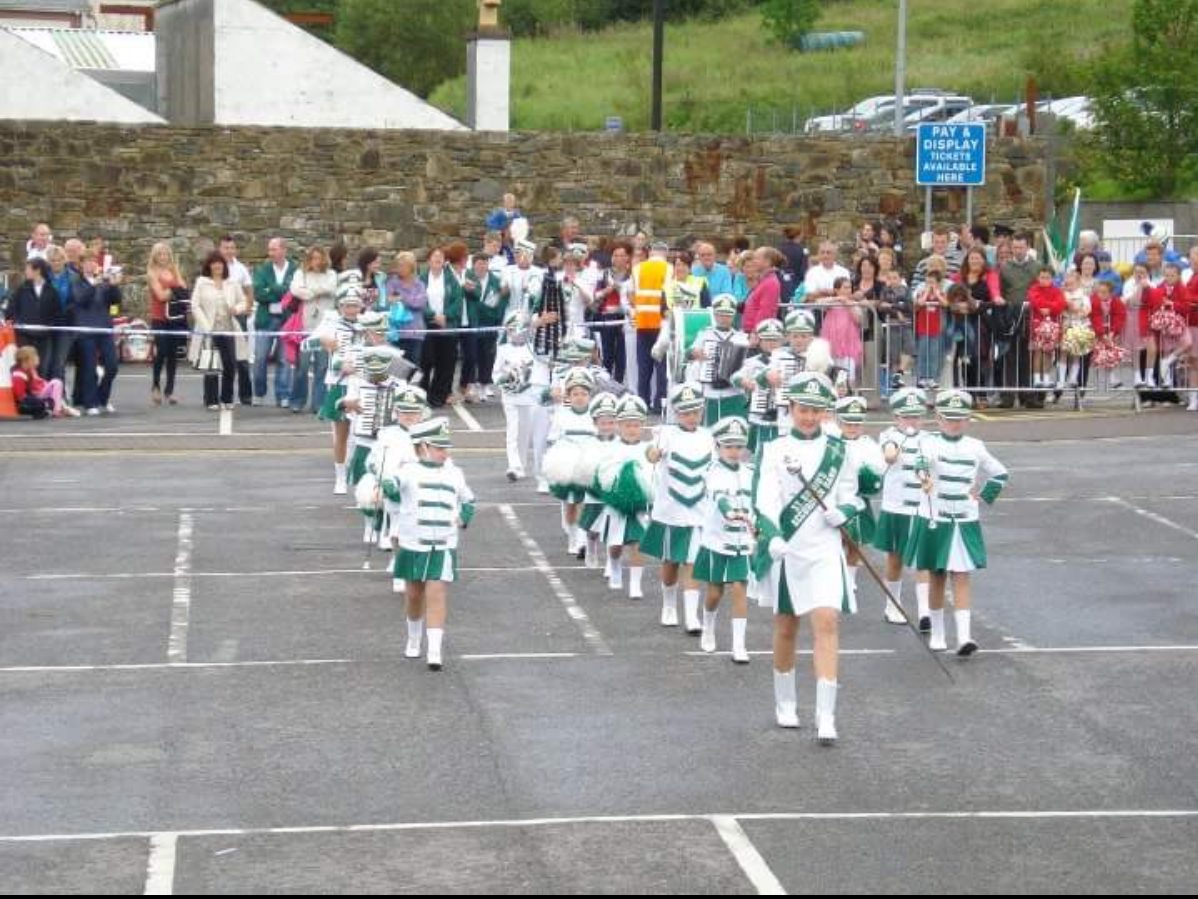
St Brigids Junior Accordion Band

This competition was highly competitive for many years with five or six bands until recently when only one or two bands have competed. In 2008 and 2009 K and S Accordion Band one the title for two years in a row, this was the 8th time they won this title and they retained it again in 2015. In 2010 St Brigids Junior Accordion Band won the title for the second time having previously won it in 2002 and they won it again in 2012. In 2013 and 2014 Fanad Accordion Band Donegal won the title they had won this competition many times in the past and they also won the senior accordion title in 1996 and 1997. In 2016 the only competitor was Holy Cross Junior Accordion Band Atticall, this was their first ever entry into the Junior section. In 2017 there were no competitors in this competition. In 2018 K and S accordion band made their first return to the All Ireland since 2015 and they won the Junior Accordion but they were the only competitors.

=== Junior Miscellaneous ===
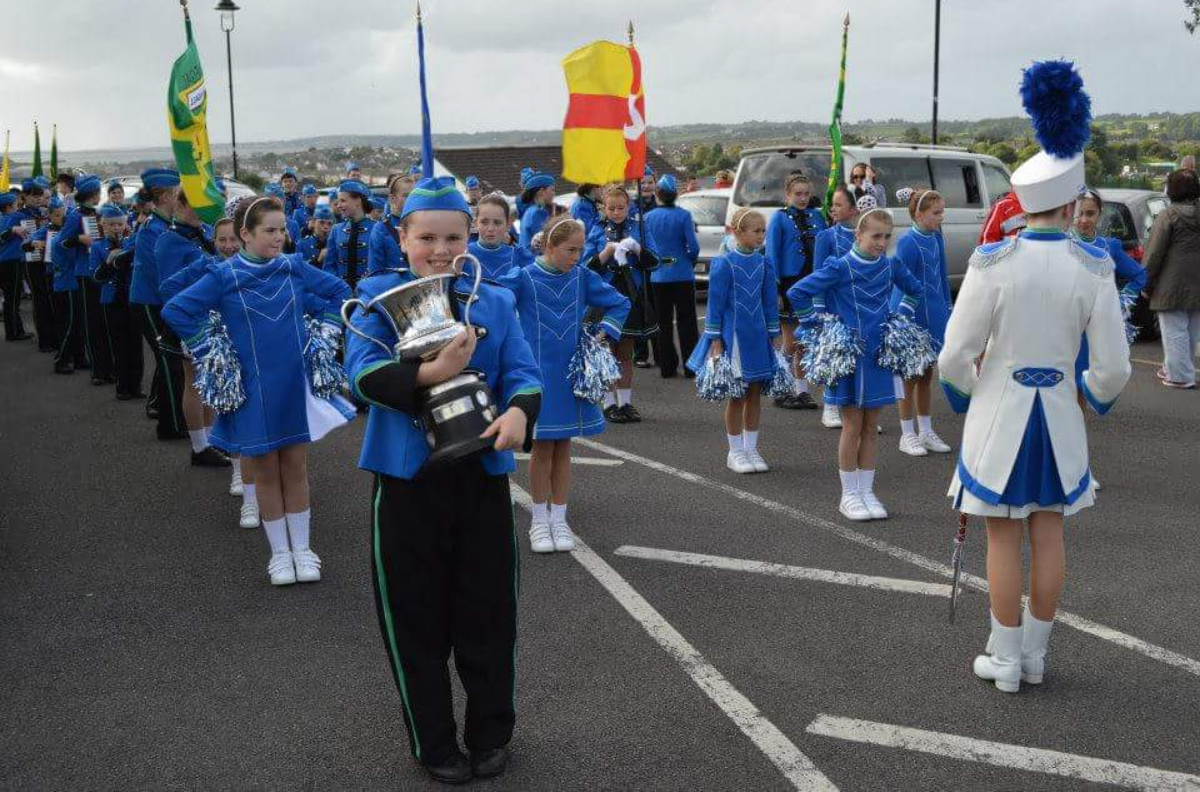
Donegal Town Band County Donegal

This competition has remained quite competitive with 3 or 4 bands competing each year. However, more recently two bands have started to dominate this competition. Donegal town Community Band won the Junior Miscellaneous title in 2012, 2013 and 2014, while Chloich Cheann Fhaola Donegal won the competition in 2008, 2009, 2015, 2016 and 2017. There have been many other bands who have tried to compete for this title, however, they have not been up to the high standards of the other two bands. In 2018 Donegal Town Band lifted the All Ireland trophy for the first time since 2014. Chloich Cheann Fhaola came a close second, with Slí Dhala Dublin in third and Banna Dammer in fourth.

=== Junior Flute ===
The Junior Flute competition has largely been abandoned in recent years and it generally has no competitors each year. Ghaobh Dobhair competed for many years in this section. In 2004 Maghery Fife & Drum Band (Co.Donegal) moved from the senior section to the Junior section and competed against Ghaobh Dobhair Flute Band also from Co.Donegal. Maghery Fife & Drum Junior Band won the title and then returned to senior level for the following year. In 2005 Ghaobh Dobhair Flute band County Donegal won the title and in 2006 Mochnas Derrynose Flute Band County Armagh won it. In 2011 & 2012 Maghery Fife & Drum Junior Band won the title being the only entrants, since then no one has entered the competition.

=== Senior Miscellaneous ===
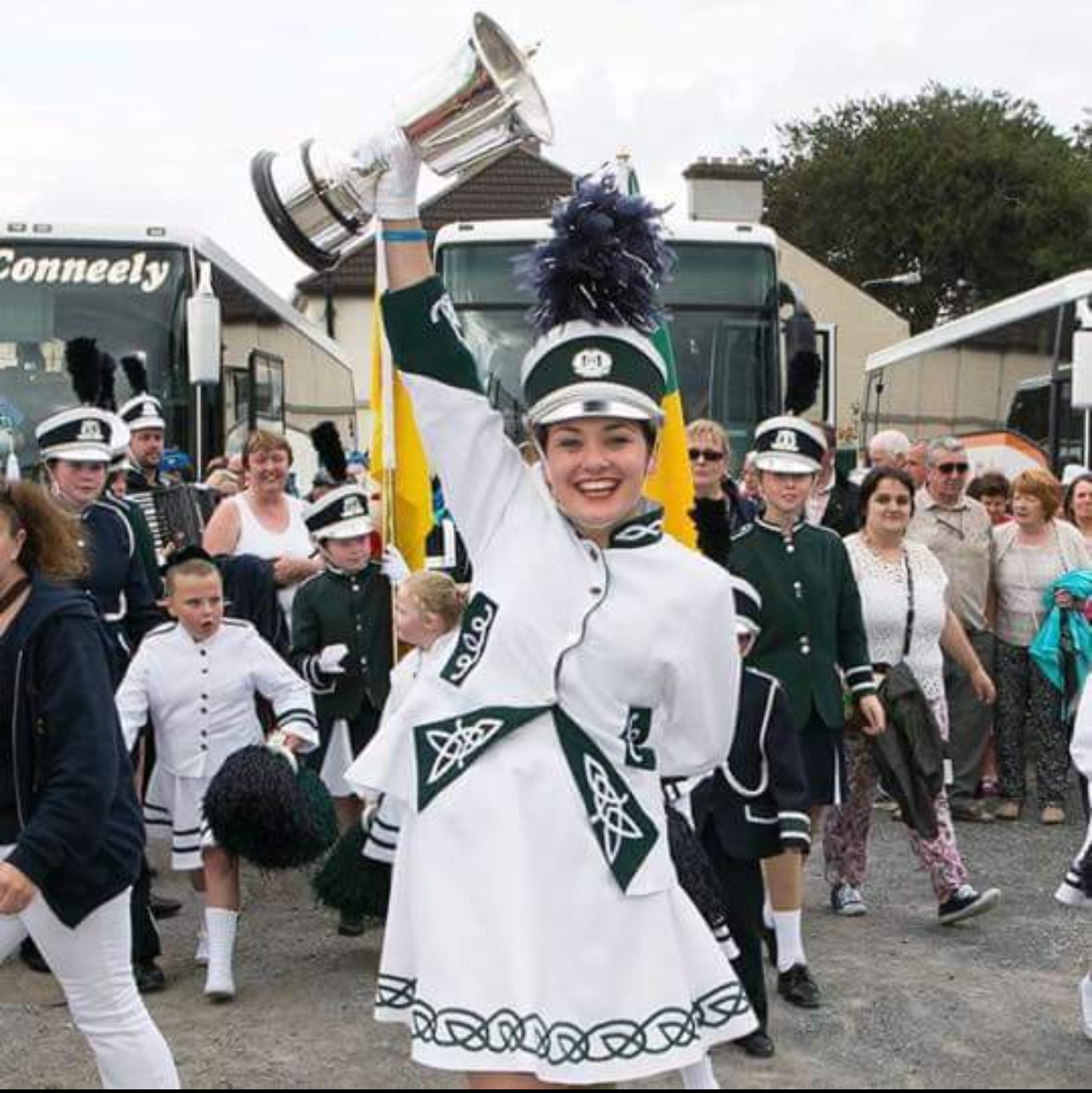
Ramelton Town band County Donegal

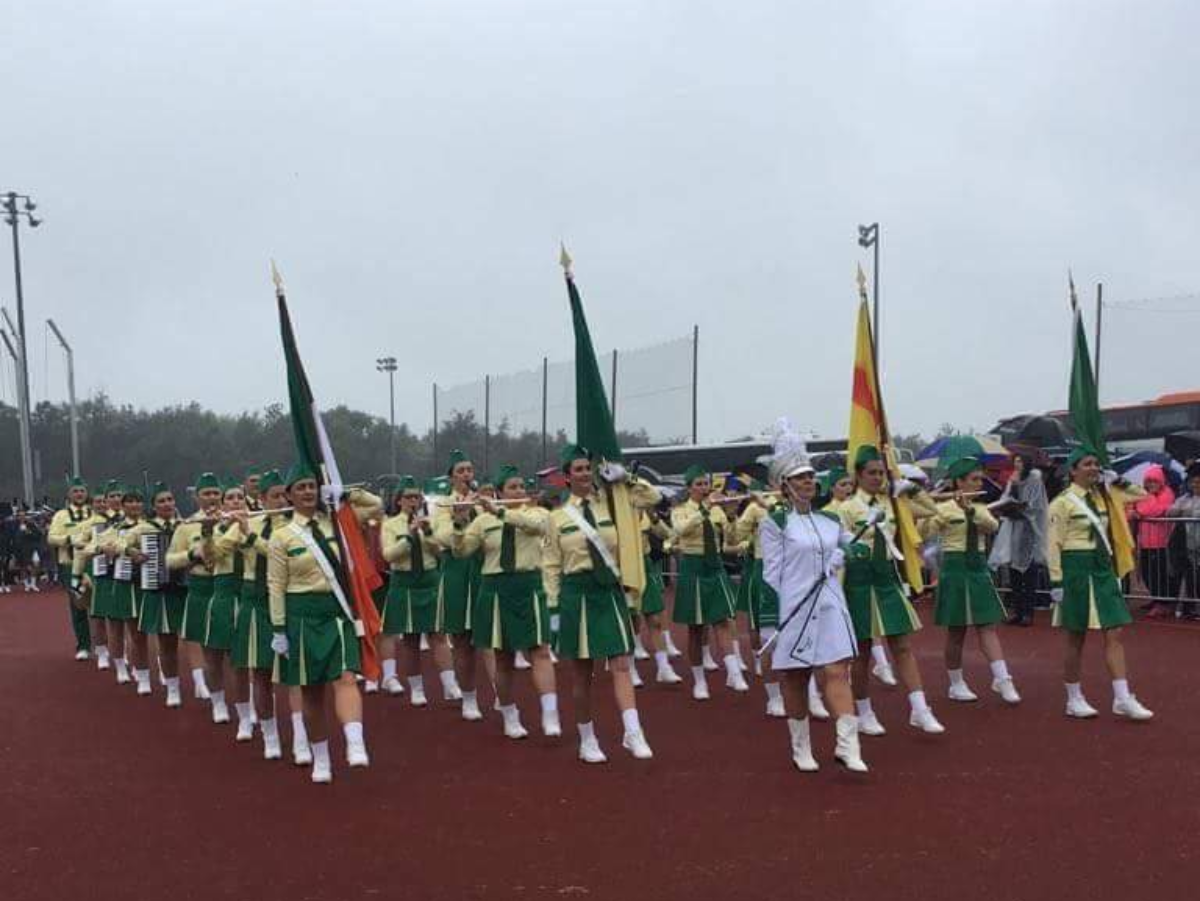
Chloich Cheann Fhaola Senior Band County Donegal

This senior competition has remained highly competitive since its introduction, with 11 different winners since 2000. St Mary's Bloomfield band won the competition three year's in a row in 1999-2001 and again in 2003 and 2005. St Mary's band Castleblaney won back-to-back All Irelands in 2007 and 2008. The following year Ramelton Town's band won the title and retained it in 2010, they then dominated the competition from 2012 to 2016 winning five All Ireland Titles in a row. They were then stopped from winning a sixth All Ireland by the resurgent Chloich Cheann Fhaola Senior who had reformed the previous summer and triumphed to win only their third senior title ever, previously winning in 1986 and 2002. They retained this title controversially in 2018 beating Ramelton town band who came second and Holy Cross Band Atticall who came third. However many people were unhappy with the results claiming Atticall band should have won.

=== Senior Flute ===
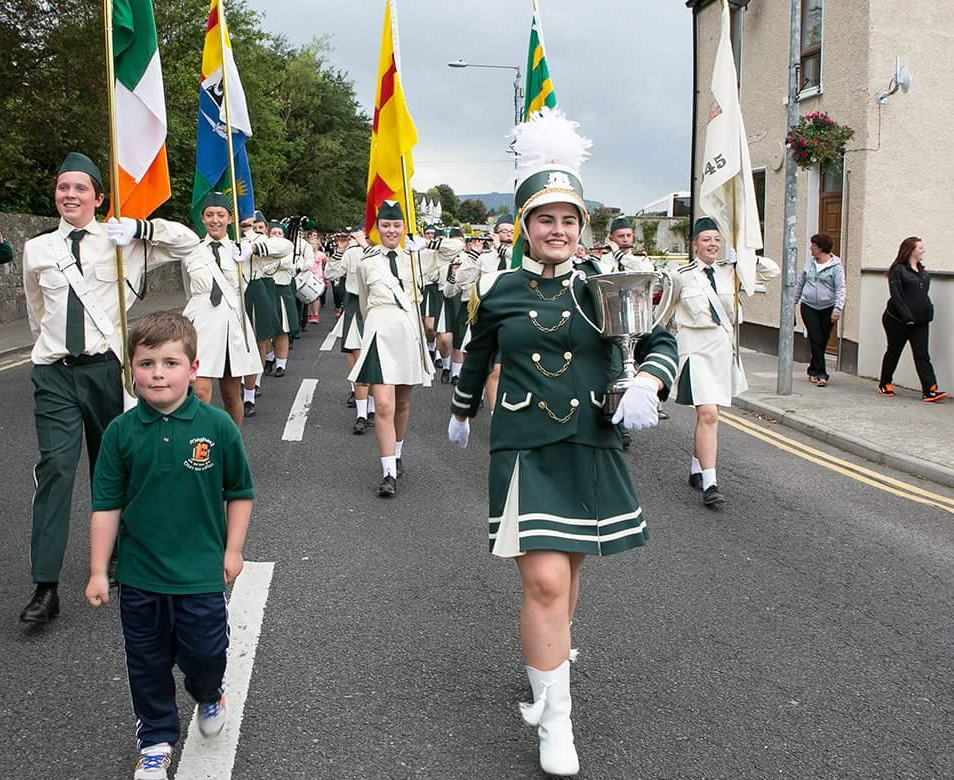
Maghery Fife and Drum Band County Donegal

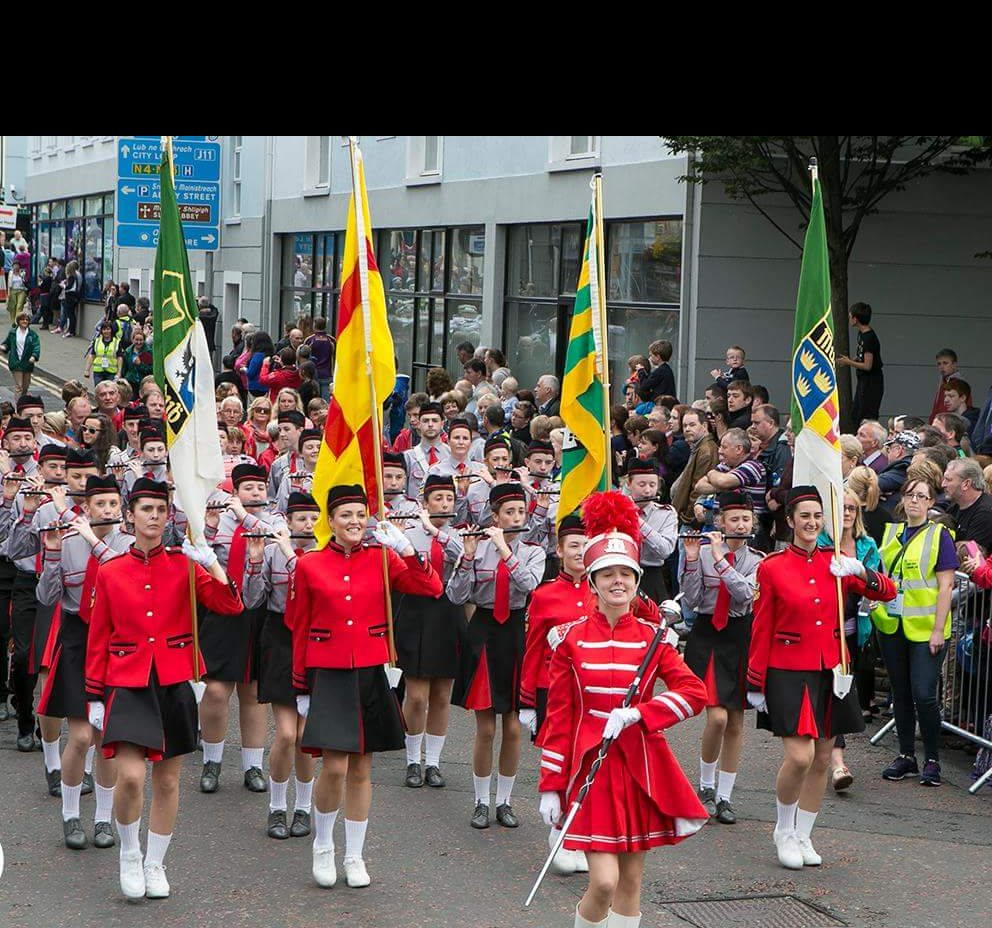
Mullaghduff Fife and Drum Band County Donegal

This competition has been highly competitive despite the low number of entrants into the competition. Only 6 bands have ever won the title but since 2006 only two bands have won it from 2006 to 2014 Mullaghduff Fife and Drum Band Donegal and since then Maghery Fife and Drum Band Donegal have won it six years in a row in 2015,16,17,18,19 & 22 (there was no competitions held in 2020 & 2021 due to covid). Mullaghduff won the competition for nine years in a row (2006 - 2014) this was something that has never been bettered in the Senior Flute Competitions but also in any other section. They tried to achieve ten years in a row but were stopped by a resurgent Maghery band. During their nine-year consecutive wins in three of those years, they had no competition. Despite the limited number of bands, the entrants every year set an unbelievably high standard that other sections could not replicate.

=== Senior Accordion ===
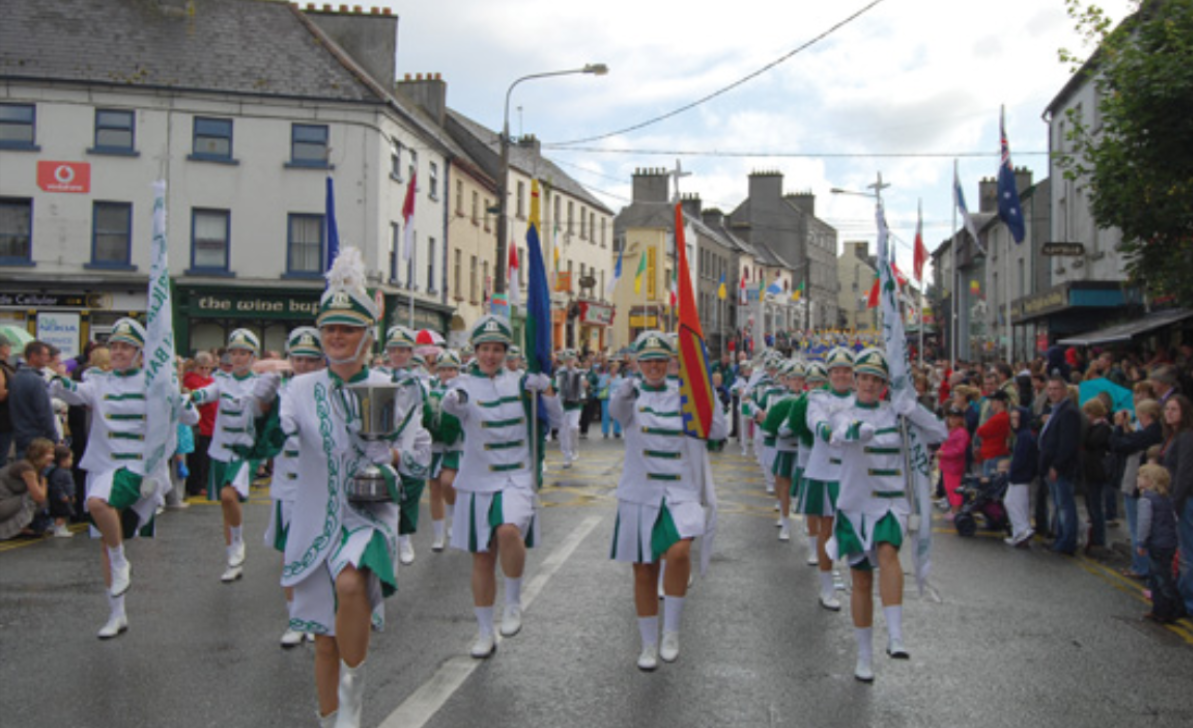
St Brigids Accordion Band Jonesbouragh County Armagh

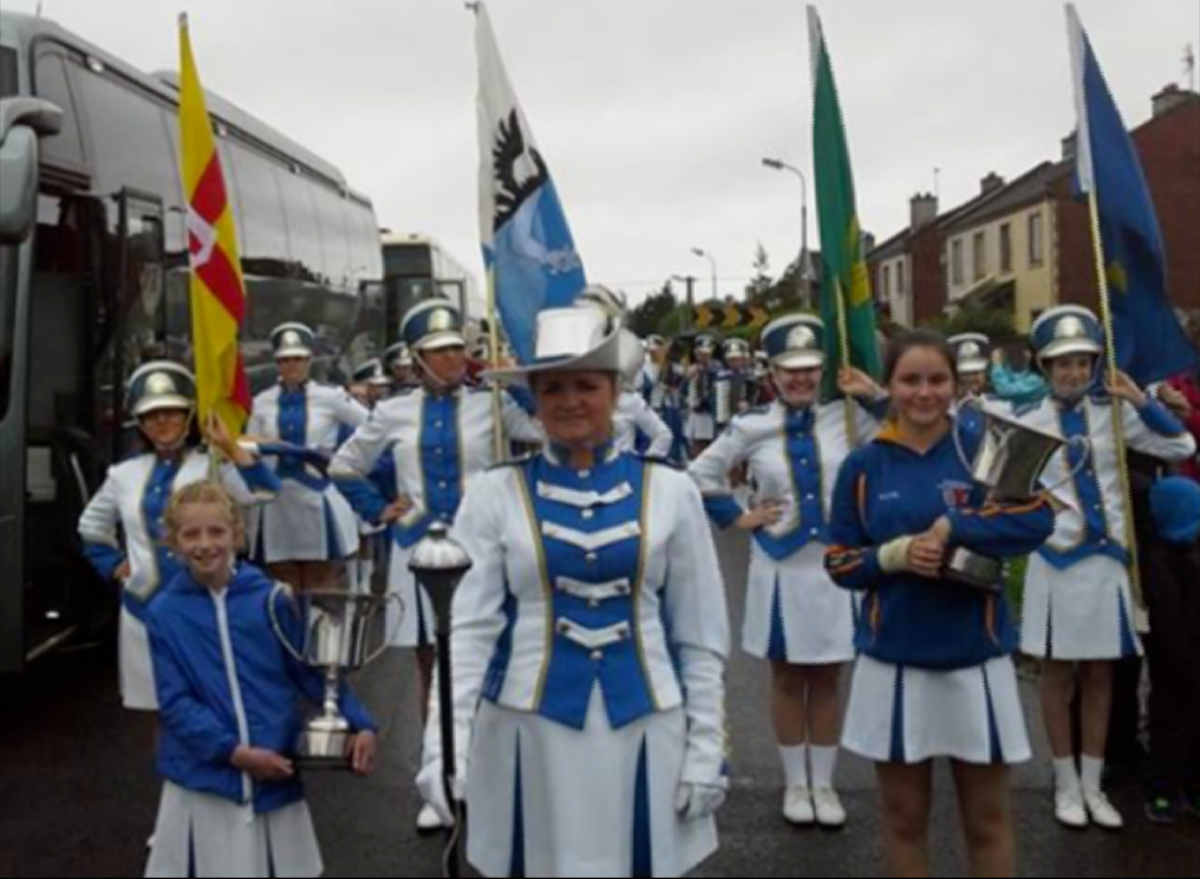
Holy Cross Accordion Band after historic double All Ireland in 2016

This competition has been one of the most popular sections at the Fleadh Marching bands competition. It has one of the highest standards of music and marching drill. On only one occasion, the title left the province of Ulster when K and S won it in 2002. Over the last decade, three bands have been very successful they are Mayobridge Accordion Band County Down, St Brigid Accordion Band County Armagh and Holy Cross Accordion Band Atticall. Mayobridge's band won the title firstly in 1984, they then won three in a row in 1999, 2000 and 2001 and in 2003 and 2006. They continued to compete at the Fleadh until 2009 but were unsuccessful only gaining second and third place, they have since become a parade-only band. Since 2007 St Brigids Accordion Band and Holy Cross Accordion Band have been the only winners. St Brigids won the title firstly in 2005, then three in a row in 2007, 2008 and 2009 and then again in 2012, 2013 and 2015. They are the most successful band in this section winning seven All Ireland Titles. However, Holy Cross Accordion Band Atticall won their first ever title in 2010 and have won 4 times since then in 2011, 2014, 2016 and 2017. In 2018 they won the competition for the third year in a row creating history for the band.

== Most Successful Bands ==
Top Five Bands in Senior Miscellaneous

Position	Miscellaneous Band	Years	Number of Titles
1st	Ramelton Town Band, County Donegal	2009, 2010, 2012, 2013, 2014, 2015, 2016	7
2nd	St Mary's Band, Broomfield, County Monaghan	1999, 2000, 2001, 2003, 2005	5
Joint 4th	St Crona's Band, An Clochán Liath, County Donegal	1985, 1991, 2004	3
3rd	Bunion Cheoil, Chloich Cheann Fhaola, County Donegal	1986, 2002, 2017, 2018	4
Joint 4th	St Cecilia's Band, Aughnamullen, County Monaghan	1993, 1994, 1995	3

Top Five Bands in Senior Flute

Position	Flute Band	Years	Number of Titles
1st	An Machaire Fife and Drum Band, County Donegal	1997, 1998, 2001, 2002, 2015, 2016, 2017, 2018, 2019, 2022, 2023, 2024, 2025, 2026	14
2nd	An Mullach Dubh Fife and Drum Band, County Donegal	1992, 1994, 1995, 1996, 1999, 2006, 2007, 2008, 2009, 2010, 2011, 2012, 2013, 2014	14
3rd	Cloney/Cluanaidh Mhór Flute Band, County Antrim	1985, 1986, 1988, 1989, 1993	5
4th	Druma Mór, Rann Na Feirste, County Donegal	1987, 1990, 1991, 2000	4
5th	Bunion Cheoil, Cnoiceach Mór, Ailt an Chorráin, County Donegal	2003, 2004, 2005	3

Top Five Bands in Senior Accordion

Position	Accordion Band	Years	Number of Titles
1st	St Brigid's Accordion Band, Jonesborough, County Armagh	2005, 2007, 2008, 2009, 2012, 2013, 2015	7
Joint 2nd	Mayobridge Accordion Youth Band, County Down	1984, 1999, 2000, 2001, 2003, 2006	6
Joint 2nd	Holy Cross Accordion Band, Atticall, County Down	2010, 2011, 2014, 2016, 2017, 2018	6
Joint 4th	St Oliver Plunkett's Accordion Band, Keady, County Armagh	1992, 1993, 1995	3
Joint 4th	St Oliver Plunkett's Accordion Band, Strabane, County Tyrone	1988, 1990, 1994	3
