= Blood Sausage (band) =

English indie rock band

- Origin: Brighton, England
- Genre: Indie rock
- Years active: 1993–1994
- Labels: Wiiija; K Clawfist
- Past members: Dale Shaw; Jo Johnson; Niki Eliot; Owen Thomas; A.J.W. Bourton

Blood Sausage were an indie rock band from Brighton, England, containing members of Huggy Bear.

== History ==
The band featured vocalist Dale Shaw, who was described as "a self-confessed 'ugly' boy who read soulful beat poetry over whichever noise patterns happened to be passing at the time". Shaw declared himself to be "the total antithesis of a rock star". The rest of the band was made up of members of Huggy Bear (Jo Johnson - bass guitar, drums, and Niki Eliot - drums, vocals) and Cee Bee Beaumont (Owen Thomas - guitar, percussion, A.J.W. Bourton - guitar, bass, flute, keyboards). The band's debut EP, Touching You in Ways That Don't Feel Comfortable, released on the Wiiija label, was named 'Single of the Week' by the NME in 1993, and this was followed by the album Happy Little Bullshit Boy in July that year. The band's next release was the Denis Lavant EP, released by K Records in November 1993. They shared a split single with Wiiija labelmates Cornershop in 1994, both bands recording Elvis Presley cover versions - "(You're the) Devil in Disguise" being the Blood Sausage contribution.

Shaw also contributed vocals to "Tera Mera Pyar" on Cornershop's 1993 album Hold on It Hurts, and took on the role of MC on Make-Up's 1996 album Destination: Love – Live! at Cold Rice. Thomas went on to play with Graham Coxon.

== Discography ==
=== 7" ===
- Touching You in Ways That Don't Feel Comfortable EP (1993), Wiiija
- Denis Lavant EP (1993), K
- "(You're the) Devil in Disguise" (A-side: "Seetar Man" by Cornershop) 7" single (1994), Clawfist

=== Album ===
- Happy Little Bullshit Boy LP (1993), Wiiija

=== Compilation ===
- The Short and Painful Life of Blood Sausage 2LP (2016), Do Yourself In [singles, unreleased and live tracks]
