= Our Troubled Youth =

Studio album by Huggy Bear
- Released: 1993
- Genre: Riot grrrl
- Label: Kill Rock Stars; Catcall

Huggy Bear chronology
| Our Troubled Youth (1993) | Weaponry Listens to Love (1994) |

Our Troubled Youth is the Huggy Bear side of a split album they released with Bikini Kill (whose side was entitled Yeah Yeah Yeah Yeah). It was released on International Women's Day 1993 on Catcall Records in the United Kingdom, and on the Kill Rock Stars label in the United States.

Professional ratings
Review scores
| Source | Rating |
|---|---|
| AllMusic | 4/5 stars |
| Robert Christgau | (neither) |
| The Encyclopedia of Popular Music | 3/5 stars |

== Influence ==
Gordon Moakes of Bloc Party has cited the album's song "Blow Dry" as being influential to him when he heard it in the early 1990s. In 2008, he wrote that the song "...was so simple, so ugly, so daring. What those two minutes of feedback and scruffy drums warned of was a new language of rock'n'roll that was dangerous, alluring and turned everything that had come before on its head." In 2015, Lisa Wright of NME wrote of the album:

"The whole thing just feels totally instinctive and effortless. From the title onwards, a more perfect teenage punk album you will not find. It’s disenfranchised and impassioned in the most fun way possible."

== Track listing ==
| No. | Title | Length |
|---|---|---|
| 1. | "Jupiter Re-Entry" |
| 2. | "T-Shirt Tucked In" |
| 3. | "Blow Dry" |
| 4. | "Nu Song" |
| 5. | "Into the Mission" |
| 6. | "Hopscortch" |
| 7. | "Aqua Girl Star" |
| 8. | "February 14th" |
