= Jullandar =

- Jullandar is an alternate spelling of Jalandhar.
- It may also refer to 6 A.M. Jullandar Shere, a single from the album Woman's Gotta Have It by Cornershop.
