= Got It Made (album) =

Studio album by Brassy
- Released: 2000
- Genre: Pop, rock 'n' roll, indie rock
- Label: Wiiija
- Producer: Brassy

Brassy chronology
Bonus Beats (1999)	Got It Made (2000)	Play Some D (2000)

Got It Made is the debut album by the British band Brassy, released in 2000. The first single was "Good Times". The band supported the album with a UK tour that was followed by a North American tour opening for Idlewild.

== Production ==
The album was produced by the band. They put more emphasis on turntablism instrumentation, with many songs originating with sampled loops. "L Vs. S" debate the merits of Laverne & Shirley. "No Competition" uses elements of drum and bass. "Parkside" samples the Beastie Boys song "Paul Revere". "That's the Way" was influenced by frontwoman Muffin Spencer's fondness for LL Cool J.

== Critical reception ==
Professional ratings
Review scores
Source	Rating
Amesbury Journal	8/10
Edmonton Journal	5/5 stars
Entertainment Weekly	B
The Gazette	4.5/5 stars
The Great Indie Discography	6/10
Pittsburgh Post-Gazette	3/4 stars
The Province	3.5/5 stars
The Tampa Tribune	2.5/4 stars
Winnipeg Sun	4/5 stars

The Independent called the album "a fully integrated pop melting-pot, every ingredient carefully chosen to create a sound that just makes you want to dance." The Edmonton Journal labeled it "ultra-funky rock 'n' roll"; the paper later listed it as the third best album of 2000. The Gazette opined, "This is what Luscious Jackson could have been had it rocked out instead of flaking out."

The Pittsburgh Post-Gazette said, "Brassy offers hip-hop-flavored high jinks on the Cibo Matto tip with hooks to spare and kitsch to burn"; the paper listed it among the 20 best albums of 2001. The Morning Call noted that "it's sassy, it's spunky and it's self-aware... But the net effect is occasionally like one of those jokey Offspring songs." The Amesbury Journal likened it to "Babes in Toyland remixed by the Lo Fidelity Allstars."

== Track listing ==
No.	Title	Length
1.	"In"
2.	"No Competition"
3.	"Parkside"
4.	"Work It Out"
5.	"That's the Way"
6.	"L Vs. S"
7.	"I Can't Wait"
8.	"You Got It"
9.	"Who Stole the Show"
10.	"Play Some D"
11.	"Nervous"
12.	"Good Times"
13.	"Put You Right"
14.	"Micstyle"
15.	"I Gotta Beef"
16.	"B'Cos We Rock"
17.	"B.R.A.S.S.Y."
