= Elvis Sex-Change =

Compilation album by Cornershop
- Released: 1993
- Recorded: West Orange, Preston, Lancs. Suite 16, Rochdale, Lancs
- Genres: Rock, indie rock
- Length: 24:09
- Label: Wiiija
- Producer: John Robb

Cornershop chronology
Elvis Sex-Change (1993)	Hold On It Hurts (1994)

Professional ratings
Review scores
Source	Rating
AllMusic	2.5/5 stars
The Encyclopedia of Popular Music	2/5 stars

Elvis Sex-Change is a compilation album by the British indie rock band Cornershop, released in 1993. It compiles the band's first two EPs In the Days of Ford Cortina and Lock Stock & Double Barrel.

== Recording ==
Singh later said, "It was very much an artistic statement that we were making, rather than a musical one, when we were starting out. A lot of it was based on the principles of William Morris, in terms of trying to do everything ourselves. We used sitars, feedback, and Eastern, laid-back music. There's samples, Punjabi lyrics, noise, there's all the ethics on that first EP."

== Critical reception ==
Greil Marcus, in Artforum, wrote that the songs are "all blocked gestures and creative exhaustion, stumbling stabs at anger or love. It's music completely defined by its limits, and touching for just that quality."

== Track listing ==
All songs written by Ben Ayres, David Chambers, Avtar Singh and Tjinder Singh.

1. "Waterlogged" – 3:56
2. "Moonshine" – 2:30
3. "Kawasaki (More Heat Than Chapati)" – 2:58
4. "Hanif Kureishi Scene" – 3:25
5. "England's Dreaming" – 3:36
6. "Trip Easy" – 2:59
7. "Summer Fun in a Beat Up Datsun" – 1:31
8. "Breaking Every Rule Language English" – 3:14
- Tracks 1 – 4 from the In the Days of Ford Cortina EP (1993)
- Tracks 5 – 8 from the Lock Stock & Double Barrel EP (1993)

== Personnel ==
- Tjinder Singh – vocals, bass, baja, dholki
- Ben Ayres – guitar, vocals
- Avtar Singh – guitar
- David Chambers – drums, baja

Additional musicians

- Anthony "Saffs" Saffery – sitar
- Kulwant Ghakal – flute

Technical

- John Robb – production
- Charlie – engineering
- Rex – engineering
- Kiran – drawings
- Jake – drawings
