= When I Was Born for the 7th Time =

Studio album by Cornershop
- Released: 8 September 1997
- Studios: 657 Holloway Road (London); Eastcote Studios (London); Sun Plantation (San Francisco); West Orange Studios (Preston)
- Genres: Indie rock; electronica; raga rock; Britpop; avant-pop
- Length: 54:12
- Label: Wiiija
- Producers: Tjinder Singh; Dan the Automator; Daddy Rappaport

Cornershop chronology
Woman's Gotta Have It (1995)	When I Was Born for the 7th Time (1997)	Handcream for a Generation (2002)

Singles from When I Was Born for the 7th Time
- 1. "Butter the Soul" Released: 25 November 1996; 2. "Good Ships" / "Funky Days Are Back Again" Released: 9 June 1997; 3. "Brimful of Asha" Released: 18 August 1997; 4. "Sleep on the Left Side" Released: 4 May 1998; 5. "Candyman" Released: 26 October 1998

When I Was Born for the 7th Time is the third studio album by English indie rock band Cornershop. It was released on 8 September 1997 through Wiiija. The album received critical acclaim and contains the international hit single "Brimful of Asha".

== Recording and release ==
When I Was Born for the 7th Time was recorded over a period of approximately two months. Singer and guitarist Tjinder Singh described the recording process as "very intense. There was a lot of smoking going on, it was a very relaxed time, and very enjoyable all the way through. At the end, our engineer had to go for medical assistance. He got freaked out. He smoked so much and then he stopped and he went loopy. He was on medication. His body couldn't take it." The album was released on 8 September 1997 by the independent record label Wiiija. The song "Brimful of Asha" was released as a single and became an international hit. The track "Candyman" was used in a Nike commercial featuring LeBron James, while "Good Shit" was featured in a commercial for Target with the chorus being altered to read "Good Stuff ..."; in the single release and in the video played on MTV Europe the title was "Good Ships". As of February 2002, the album has sold 198,000 copies in the U.S. according to Nielsen SoundScan.

== Critical reception ==
Professional ratings
Review scores
Source	Rating
AllMusic	4.5/5 stars
Chicago Tribune	4/4 stars
Christgau's Consumer Guide	A
Entertainment Weekly	B
The Guardian	5/5 stars
NME	6/10
Rolling Stone	4/5 stars
The Rolling Stone Album Guide	4/5 stars
Select	4/5
Spin	9/10

When I Was Born for the 7th Time received high acclaim from music critics. Writing for Rolling Stone, Neva Chonin opined that the album "is a cohesive, finely crafted LP in which the last album's low-fi funk expands into low, fat grooves, and Singh's pancultural, anti-racist lyrics become more sophisticated but no less impassioned." Robert Christgau of The Village Voice called it "an international pop so seamless that its fusion of alt-rock, Punjabi melody, hip hop, and what-all is subsumed into its own song-based catchiness". In 1998, the album was ranked at number three in The Village Voice's Pazz & Jop critics' poll for 1997. Similarly, Spin journalists placed the album at number one in their list of Top 20 Albums of the Year. In 2000, Q magazine placed the album at number 68 in its list of 100 Greatest British Albums. The album was also included in the book 1001 Albums You Must Hear Before You Die.

== Track listing ==
All tracks are written by Tjinder Singh, except where noted.

No.	Title	Writer(s)	Length
1.	"Sleep on the Left Side"		4:06
2.	"Brimful of Asha"		5:17
3.	"Butter the Soul"		3:19
4.	"Chocolat"		1:24
5.	"We're in Yr Corner"		5:47
6.	"Funky Days Are Back Again"		3:41
7.	"What Is Happening?"	Singh; Ben Ayres	2:15
8.	"When the Light Appears Boy" (featuring Allen Ginsberg)	Allen Ginsberg; Singh	2:41
9.	"Coming Up"		1:03
10.	"Good Shit"		4:40
11.	"Good to Be on the Road Back Home" (with Paula Frazer)		5:45
12.	"It's Indian Tobacco My Friend"		4:51
13.	"Candyman" (with Justin Warfield)	Larry Coryell; Singh	3:49
14.	"State Troopers"		3:07
15.	"Norwegian Wood (This Bird Has Flown)"	John Lennon; Paul McCartney	2:27
Total length:			54:12

== Personnel ==
Credits are adapted from the album's album notes.

Cornershop

- Tjinder Singh – vocals, guitar, scratching, dholki
- Ben Ayres – tamboura, guitar, keyboards
- Anthony Saffery – sitar, harmonium, keyboards
- Nick Simms – drums
- Peter Bengry – percussion

Additional musicians

- Robert Buller – strings ("Brimful of Asha")
- Elizabeth Johnson – strings ("Brimful of Asha")
- Grace Winder – strings ("Brimful of Asha")
- Allen Ginsberg – vocals ("When the Light Appears Boy")
- Lourdes Belart – vocals ("Good Shit")
- Paula Frazer – vocals ("Good to Be on the Road Back Home")
- Ray Dickaty – flute ("Good to Be on the Road Back Home")
- Justin Warfield – rapping ("Candyman")

Technical

- Tjinder Singh – production (tracks 1., 2., 4. – 12., 14., 15.)
- Dan the Automator – production (tracks 1., 10., 13.)
- Daddy Rappaport – production (track 3.)
- Alan Gregson – engineering
- Philip Bagenal – engineering
- Mike Marsh – mastering
- Deborah Norcross – art direction and design
- Catalina Gonzales – front cover photography
- Thomas Bayrle – inside illustration
- Frank Maddocks – afro illustration

== Charts ==
Chart performance for When I Was Born for the 7th Time
Chart (1997–1998)	Peak position
Australian Albums (ARIA)	81
New Zealand Albums (RMNZ)	12
Scottish Albums (Official Charts)	22
Swedish Albums (Sverigetopplistan)	60
UK Albums (Official Charts)	17

== Certifications ==
Certifications for When I Was Born for the 7th Time
Region	Certification	Certified units/sales
United Kingdom (BPI)	Gold	100,000^{^}
^{^} Shipments figures based on certification alone.
