= Judy Sucks a Lemon for Breakfast =

Studio album by Cornershop
- Released: 27 July 2009
- Genres: Indie pop; indie rock; raga rock
- Length: 57:02
- Label: Ample Play
- Producer: Tjinder Singh

Cornershop chronology
Handcream for a Generation (2002)	Judy Sucks a Lemon for Breakfast (2009)	Cornershop and the Double 'O' Groove Of (2011)

Professional ratings
Aggregate scores
Source	Rating
Metacritic	73/100
Review scores
Source	Rating
AllMusic	3.5/5 stars
Daily Mirror	4/5 stars
The Guardian	4/5 stars
The Independent	4/5 stars
MSN Music (Consumer Guide)	A−
The Observer	3/5 stars
Pitchfork	7.3/10
PopMatters	6/10 stars
Rolling Stone	3/5 stars
Uncut	4/5

Judy Sucks a Lemon for Breakfast is a 2009 studio album by British band Cornershop. It was their first album in seven years following 2002's Handcream for a Generation.

The band were dropped by Beggars Banquet Records after disagreements about the promotion of their previous album, and frontman Tjinder Singh explained the reasons for the seven-year gap: "We needed to take a break from doing music. I didn't stop working but the climate didn't seem very fertile for what we were doing. It was really a case of waiting for a time when it was more receptive." The band also made a film in that time, which has yet to be released, and set up their own Ample Play record label. The band released the album independently through their website and in local shops.

The album received generally positive reviews and was particularly praised for its diverse sound. Like previous Cornershop albums, Judy draws on soul, funk and rock music and features various Indian instruments; its music has drawn comparisons to the Rolling Stones and T. Rex. The Daily Mirror gave the album four stars out of five, with reviewer Gavin Martin stating: "Their surefire smashes, wired energy and saucy singalongs are as strong as ever on this album."

== Track listing ==
All songs written by Tjinder Singh except where noted.

1. "Who Fingered Rock 'n' Roll" - 3:48
2. "Soul School" - 3:32
3. "Half Brick" - 0:52
4. "Judy Sucks a Lemon for Breakfast" - 5:16
5. "Shut Southall Down" - 1:13
6. "Free Love" - 5:38
7. "The Roll Off Characteristics (Of History in the Making)" - 4:39
8. "Operation Push" - 4:18
9. "The Mighty Quinn" (Dylan) - 3:32
10. "The Constant Springs" - 4:09
11. "Chamchu" - 3:25
12. "The Turned on Truth (The Truth Is Turned On)" - 16:45
