= Cornershop and the Double 'O' Groove Of =

Cornershop and the Double 'O' Groove Of...

Studio album by Cornershop with Bubbley Kaur
- Released: 13 March 2011
- Genres: Pop, alternative, Punjabi
- Length: 38:10
- Label: Ample Play

Cornershop chronology
Judy Sucks a Lemon for Breakfast (2009)	Cornershop and the Double 'O' Groove Of... (2011)	Urban Turban (2012)

Cornershop and the Double 'O' Groove Of... is a 2011 studio album by the British band Cornershop. It follows their 2009 album Judy Sucks a Lemon for Breakfast. The album had been six years in the making and is a collaboration album with Bubbley Kaur, a previously unrecorded Punjabi singer. The funds for its release were raised via Pledgemusic.

== Reception ==
Professional ratings
Aggregate scores
Source	Rating
Metacritic	78/100
Review scores
Source	Rating
AllMusic	3.5/5 stars
Rolling Stone	3.5/5 stars
Spin	6/10 stars

The album has, like many previous Cornershop releases, received positive reviews, with its interesting blend of dance and Punjabi music particularly popular. When the track Topknot was released in 2004, the late John Peel, a fan of the band, was said to have "played it to death. Uncut were particularly praiseworthy, commenting "[It] isn't just great music, it fuses disparate cultures with such joyous irreverence that, for 40 inspirational minutes, entire notions of national borders and racial divides cease to exist". Mojo said "Kaur came to sing here through chance meetings and filmic, serendipitous intervention from a London cabbie. If this tale ever reaches the cinema, an effervescent soundtrack is ready and waiting". The newspaper The Daily Mirror described the album as "a striking blend of dance-crazed hip-hop grooves and trilling, thrilling Punjabi folk. It also introduces the sensational Bubbley Kaur. The previously unrecorded New Delhi-born, Lancashire-raised housewife is possibly the greatest natural new singer you'll hear all year".

Uncut placed it at number 48 on its list of the "Top 50 Albums of 2011".

Cornershop would subsequently go on to reunite with Kaur for the 2026 single "Bounce and Salute".

== Track listing ==
All songs credited to Tjinder Singh and Bubbley Kaur.

1. "United Provinces Of India" - 3:26
2. "Topknot" - 3:39
3. "The 911 Curry" - 3:32
4. "Natch" - 2:34
5. "Double Decker Eyelashes" - 4:13
6. "The Biro Pen" - 4:28
7. "Supercomputed" - 3:44
8. "Once There Was A Wintertime" - 3:14
9. "Double Digit" - 3:38
10. "Don't Shake It" - 5:42
