= Huggy Bear (band) =

Early 1990s riot grrrl band

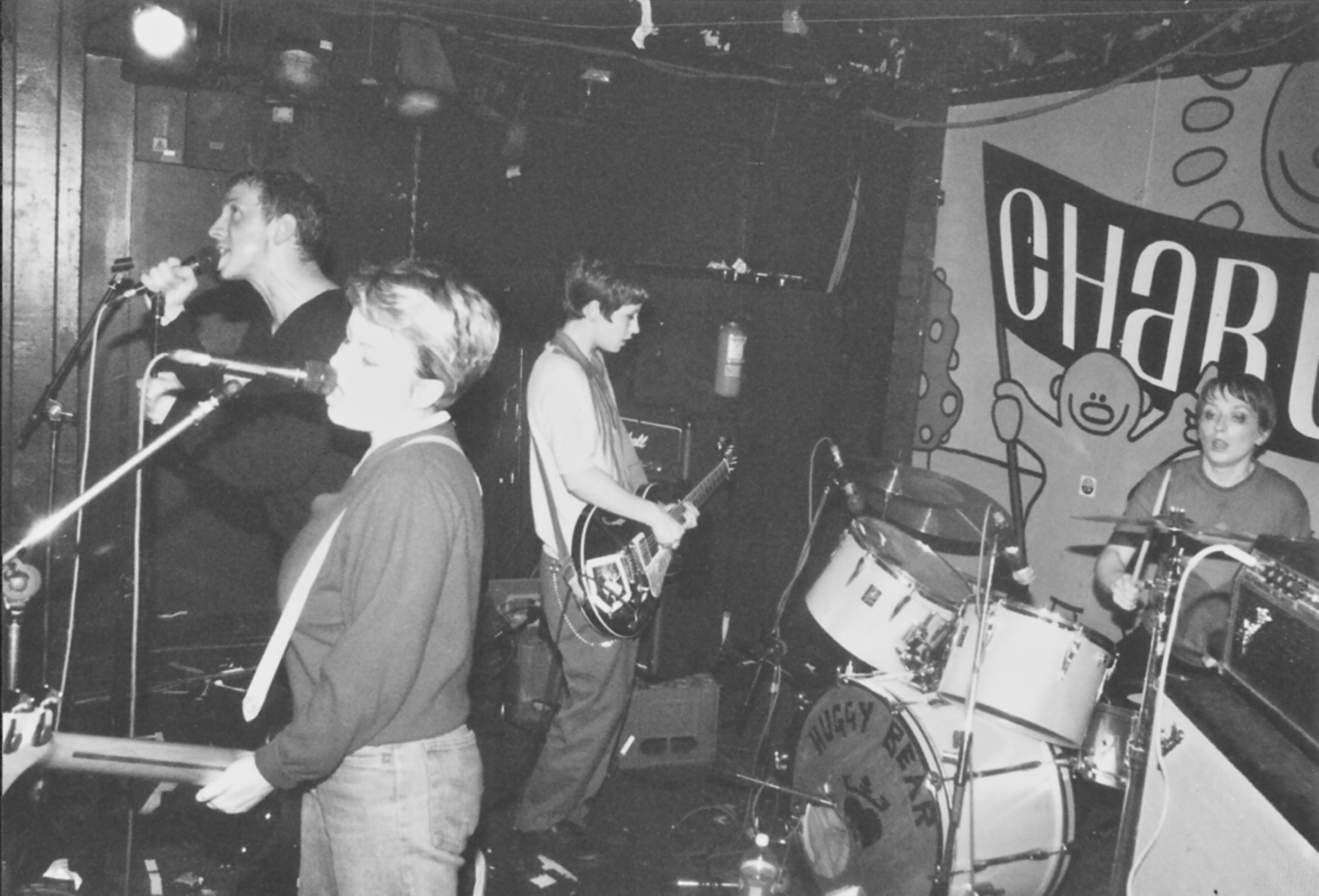
- Huggy Bear (1994)

Background information
- Origin: London/Brighton, England
- Genre: Punk rock • art punk • riot grrrl
- Years active: 1991–1994
- Labels: Wiiija, Kill Rock Stars, Gravity
- Past members: Niki Eliot; Jo Johnson; Jon Slade; Karen Hill; Chris Rowley

Huggy Bear were an English riot grrrl band, formed in 1991 and based in Brighton; active for three years, they played their final gig in December 1994.

== History ==
Evolving in tandem with the Olympia, Washington-based riot grrrl movement led by feminist bands such as Bikini Kill, Huggy Bear called themselves "girl-boy revolutionaries", both in reference to their political philosophy and the gender makeup of their band.

For the majority of their existence, they refused to be photographed or interviewed by mainstream press, nor gave their full names once they began releasing records formally. In spite of a major label bidding war, Huggy Bear stayed with indie label Wiiija.

Our situation was different to the one the American Riot Grrrls were responding to. The underground in London had deteriorated totally, there wasn't really much of an alternative . . . 'indie' just became an abstract term for a style of music, not ideas or values, 'cause they were all signing to major labels. The notion of selling out wasn't important. Punk rock wasn't important. Fanzines were seen as a sad joke, so we had to explain stuff that might have been obvious to American kids but was alien to young British kids. The reasons for being independent were snorted at.

Their avant-garde debut EP, Rubbing the Impossible to Burst, was released in 1992, and in the same year they began working closely with Bikini Kill as riot grrrl's popularity peaked on both sides of the Atlantic, culminating in a split album on Catcall Records (Huggy Bear) and Kill Rock Stars (Bikini Kill) called Our Troubled Youth/Yeah Yeah Yeah Yeah, the names of the Huggy Bear and Bikini Kill sides, respectively. Huggy Bear then released a series of EPs, which were collected on Taking the Rough with the Smooch.

On 14 February 1993, Huggy Bear performed "Her Jazz" on the British television programme, The Word. After their set, the band stayed in the studio to watch a report on two American models who called themselves "the Barbi Twins". Huggy Bear and their fans became upset at this and started shouting at the show's presenter Terry Christian. They were ejected from the studio, and a spokesperson for The Word later claimed that one of the band's friends had "bit the face of a member of our production team." Future Goldblade frontman and editor of music blog Louderthanwar, John Robb was with the band in the studio and said no-one got bitten and the security was heavy-handed and had to be calmed down. The performance was given a Melody Maker cover story, the event being compared to the Sex Pistols' Bill Grundy incident.

In early 1994, Slade left the band. Huggy Bear released two more singles and Weaponry Listens to Love in 1994, their first full-length album as well as their final release. The band would play their final show in December of that year, keeping to their promise to only exist for three years.

In 2024, a Huggy Bear retrospective book Killed (Of Kids) was published, featuring zines, memorabilia and an oral history of the band. A book launch was held at New River Studios at which former band members Hill, Slade, and Rowley performed Huggy Bear songs for the first time in thirty years.

== Other projects ==
Members of Huggy Bear also played as the Furbelows. In 1993, Rowley and Johnson released an EP as The Element of Crime on Soul Static Sound records, with members of Linus, Skinned Teen, Sister George and Blood Sausage. Elliott and Johnson also joined Blood Sausage, while Rowley assisted Skinned Teen live and with artwork, and Elliot guested on their 1994 album.

After leaving Huggy Bear, Hill formed Phantom Pregnancies with Delia from Mambo Taxi and Sean from Wat Tyler. Slade briefly joined I'm Being Good, and then Comet Gain. Since 2020 he has played bass in Snoozers with Nadia Buyse (Dubais) and Steve Dore (Casual Dots).

Jo Johnson has been playing and releasing solo ambient music since 2012. In 2014, she released debut digital album Weaving on Further Records. Since then, she has released The Serpentine Path on Going In, The Wave Ahead EP on Mysteries of the Deep and, in 2024, a third album, Let Go Your Fear on Castles in Space, and contributed to a number of compilations. Jo began collaborating with pianist and composer Hilary Robinson during the pandemic and the duo released Session One on 9128.live in 2021.

In 2019, Chris Rowley formed new band Adulkt Life with former members of Male Bonding. On 27 November of that year, they played their first show at the Lexington in London. They released their first single and a digital zine on 18 August 2020, "County Pride", on What's Your Rupture?, followed by debut album Book of Curses. Their second album There Is No Desire was released in 2023.

In 2025, Jon and Chris, with Lise Frances ex-Help She Can't Swim, formed new band Unmarry Me, releasing a 7" on Happy Soul Records, and contributing to a split single with Lungleg.

== Line-up ==
- Niki Eliot: bass and vocals
- Jo Johnson: guitar and vocals
- Karen Hill: drums and piano
- Chris Rowley: vocals, trumpet and piano
- Jon Slade: guitar

== Discography ==
=== Albums ===
- Our Troubled Youth (Huggy Bear), mini LP split with Yeah Yeah Yeah Yeah (Bikini Kill), 8 March '93, CATCALL / Kill Rock Stars 206
- Weaponry Listens to Love, LP/CD, 21 Nov '94, WIIIJA

=== Compilations ===
- We Bitched, cass, 1992, WIIIJA [demo recordings, inc. exclusive tracks Coral Kill; Sour Creamer Stag, Bumper Sticker, Cherry Cherry]
- Huggy Nation / Kisser Boy Kisser Girl, cass, 1992, Soul Static Sound [V/A compilation inc. Huggy Bear & side projects]
- Taking the Rough with the Smooch, LP/CD, 1993, KILL ROCK STARS/WIIIJA [compilation of WIIIJA 18/WIIIJA 23/Trouble 001]
- For Every Wolf That Roams, cass, 1994, Famous Monsters of Filmland [live at the Square, Harlow]
- Basic Strategies For Going Out/Radio Sessions, 10"/cass, 2026, JABS [compilation of 1992/1993 Peel Sessions etc.]

=== Singles and EPs ===
- Rubbing the Impossible to Burst 7", SEPT'92, WIIIJA 16, Ltd edition of 2000 pressed [Katholic Kunt; High Street Jupiter Supercone // Snail Messenger Loss; Single Bullets]
- Kiss Curl for the Kid's Lib Guerrillas, 7", DEC'92, WIIIJA 18 [Derwin; Sizzlemeet // Concrete Life; Carnt Kiss]
- "14 February" / "Into the Mission" – one-sided 7" given out at a Brighton gig, 14.2.93
- Her Jazz, 7", 93, CATCALL/WIIIJA – Trouble001 [Her Jazz // Prayer; Pro No From Now]
- Shimmies in the Super 8, double 7", 4 songs of Huggy Bear, 2 of Darlin', 1 of COLM, 1 of Stereolab, 1993, DUOPHONIC, Ltd edition of 800 [Trafalgar Square; Godziller; More Music From Bells; Snow White, Rose Red]
- Don't Die, 7", AUG'93, WIIIJA 23 [Dissthentic Penetration; Teen Tighterns; No Sleep // Shaved Pussy Poetry; Pansy Twist]
- Long Distance Lovers, 7", '94, GRAVITY No. 9 [Steppin on Bugs; Limit 2 Surf // Tuff Lovin; Code Fucker]
- Main Squeeze, miniCD, '94, FELLAHEEN RECORDS Jack 011-2 [Children Absent From Heaven Says; Red Flipper No. 2; My Best Kiss]
