= Weaponry Listens to Love =

Studio album by Huggy Bear
- Released: 1994
- Genre: Punk rock, riot grrrl
- Label: Kill Rock Stars; Wiiija

Huggy Bear chronology
Main Squeeze EP7 (1994)	Weaponry Listens to Love (1994)

Weaponry Listens to Love is an album by the English riot grrrl band Huggy Bear. It was released in 1994. The band broke up shortly after a North American tour, due to their self-imposed three-year time frame.

== Critical reception ==
Professional ratings
Review scores
Source	Rating
AllMusic	3/5 stars
The Encyclopedia of Popular Music	2/5 stars
NME	6/10
Martin C. Strong	5/10

Trouser Press thought that "Huggy Bear is a complete disaster, a stunningly dull band grinding away behind an incomprehensible sloganeer who won’t shut up." The Village Voice wrote that "like all bands who forged their spirit in the embrace of the amateur, on Weaponry they seem not to know what to do with their newfound expertise; Jo's guitarwork could unhinge the jaw of most metalhead boy musos, but also seems to have disarmed her bandmates." The Guardian opined that the album "is as enraged as the first, but lacks its touches of modulating whimsy." The Rocket stated: "Brutal, harsh and chilling, the band's lyrics are an equal match for the powerhouse musical roll."

AllMusic wrote that "the material here is less singsongy and obvious, opting for sludgier instrumentation and more male lead vocals than in the past."

== Track listing ==
No.	Title	Length
1.	"Immature Adolescence"
2.	"Fuck Your Heart"
3.	"Facedown"
4.	"Warming Rails"
5.	"On the Wolves' Tip"
6.	"Erotic Bleeding"
7.	"16 & Suicide"
8.	"Obesity & Speed in 15 Refractions"
9.	"For Insecure Offenders"
10.	"'Why I'm a Lawbreaker'"
11.	"Local Arrogance 1994"

== Personnel ==
- Niki Eliot – bass, piano, vocals
- Karen Hill – drums, piano
- Jo Johnson – guitar, vocals
- Chris Rowley – vocals, trumpet
