= Cornershop =

English indie rock band

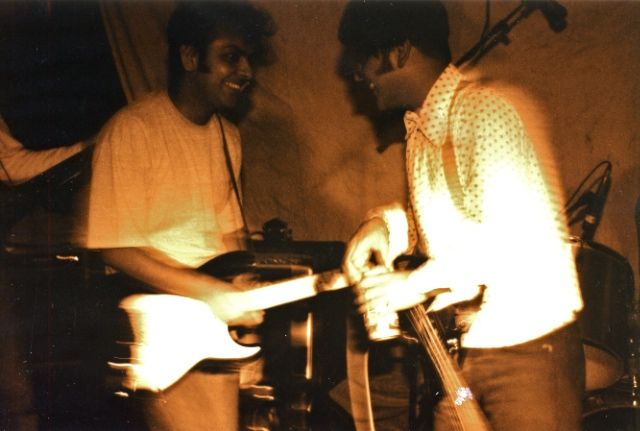
- Cornershop c. 1993

Background information
- Origin: Leicester, England
- Genres: Alternative rock; indie rock; alternative dance; Britpop
- Years active: 1991–present
- Labels: Wiiija; Rough Trade; Ample Play; Luaka Bop; Warner Bros.
- Members: Tjinder Singh; Ben Ayres; Nick Simms; Peter Bengry; Adam Blake; Pete Downing; James Milne
- Past members: Avtar Singh; David Chambers; Anthony Saffery; Wallis Healey; Pete Hall
- Website: www.cornershop.com

Cornershop are an English indie rock band formed in Leicester, in 1991. The group are best known for their single "Brimful of Asha" from their third album When I Was Born for the 7th Time. A remixed version of the track reached number one on the UK singles chart in 1998. They were formed by Tjinder Singh (singer, songwriter, and guitar), his brother Avtar Singh (bass guitar, vocals), David Chambers (drums), and Ben Ayres (guitar, keyboards, and tamboura), the first three having previously been members of General Havoc, who released one single (the Fast Jaspal EP) in 1991. The band name originated from a stereotype referring to British Asians often owning corner shops. Their music is a fusion of Indian music, indie rock, alternative and electronic dance music.

== History ==
=== Formation and early years: 1991–1996 ===
Tjinder Singh formed General Havoc whilst a student at Lancashire Polytechnic in Preston in 1987. He relocated to Leicester, where his brother and sister lived. He formed Cornershop in 1991 along with his brother Avtar and Chambers and Ayres while working as a barman at Leicester's Magazine pub, a popular local music venue near O'Jays, where the band played their first gigs. Named after the stereotype of South Asians owning corner shops, Cornershop drew inspiration from Singh's experiences as a British-born Sikh, mixing traditional Punjabi music with British indie rock. In the early 1990s, when the UK music press criticised singer Morrissey after accusations of racism, the band were invited to comment and the Melody Maker ran a story featuring the band burning a picture of the singer outside the offices of EMI.

Their debut release, the In the Days of Ford Cortina EP, produced by John Robb was pressed on "curry-coloured vinyl" and contained a blend of Indian-tinged noise pop. The sound mellowed somewhat with the release of debut album Hold On It Hurts in 1994, described by Trouser Press as "a politically charged popfest, ten tracks of noisy delights that meld incisive social commentary with a firm hold on British post-punk." The album impressed David Byrne, who signed the band to his label Luaka Bop. Although David Chambers left the band in 1994 and was replaced by Nick Simms, the band re-emerged in 1995 with the "6 a.m. Jullandar Shere" single and the album Woman's Gotta Have It, also touring the United States, including some dates on the Lollapalooza tour. The band also toured Europe with Beck, Stereolab and Oasis.

=== Mainstream success: 1997–2001 ===
The band released their critically acclaimed album, When I Was Born for the 7th Time, in September 1997. The album incorporates a variety of genres, combining indie rock, Britpop, electronic music, and hip-hop. The track "When the Light Appears Boy" features Allen Ginsberg, while "Candyman" includes Justin Warfield, and "Good to Be on the Road Back Home" features Paula Frazer. The band also covers the Beatles' "Norwegian Wood (This Bird Has Flown)" in Punjabi.

Recorded in multiple studios across London, San Francisco, and Preston, Lancashire, the album was produced by Tjinder Singh in collaboration with Dan the Automator and Daddy Rappaport. Rolling Stone named it one of the essential recordings of the 1990s, and it was ranked No. 1 on Spin's list of "Top 20 Albums of the Year" for 1997. The album reached No. 17 on the UK Albums Chart and was certified Gold.

The album's lead single, "Brimful of Asha", topped John Peel's Festive 50 list in 1997 and became an international hit following a popular remix by Fatboy Slim. The song is a tribute to the Indian playback singer Asha Bhosle and reflects Singh's love for Trojan Records and vinyl culture.

Cornershop took a break from touring in 1998, during which frontman Tjinder Singh and guitarist Ben Ayres worked as DJs and formed the side project Clinton. In 2000, they released a disco-inspired album, Disco and the Halfway to Discontent, as part of their side-project. This inspired the launch of the London-based club night called Buttoned Down Disco, which took its name from the third track on the album.

=== Further activities and recent years: 2002–present ===
Cornershop's next official release was the 2002 album Handcream for a Generation. The album was recorded between 2000 and 2001 at West Orange Studios in Preston, Lancashire, and Eastcote Studios in London, with Singh producing most of the album and Rob Swift co-producing two tracks. Drawing on soul, funk, disco, house, reggae, and psychedelic rock, featuring instruments like sitar and tabla, the album also featured a collaboration with Noel Gallagher on guitar. Two singles, "Lessons Learned from Rocky I to Rocky III" and "Staging", peaked at 37 and 80 on the UK Singles Chart, respectively. Cornershop promoted the album with UK and US tours, festival appearances, and performances with Oasis.

Despite initial success, Cornershop parted ways with Wiiija in October 2002 due to low album sales. Since 2003, they have reportedly been working on a film about London's independent music scene. In 2004, they released Topknot with Bubbley Kaur on Rough Trade Records, followed by the 2006 single "Wop the Groove", featuring Rowetta from Happy Mondays. Their song "Candyman" was later used in Nike's LeBron James VI shoe commercial, The Six "Chalk", in 2008. In July 2009, they released the album Judy Sucks a Lemon for Breakfast, led by the single "The Roll-Off Characteristics (Of History in the Making)" on their label, Ample Play.

In 2011, Cornershop were awarded a prize for Commitment to Scene at the UK Asian Music Awards, and released Cornershop and the Double 'O' Groove Of, a collaborative album with Punjabi folk singer Bubbley Kaur, which was critically acclaimed. They also launched the "Singhles Club", a subscription service featuring musical collaborations and digital artwork. Their eighth album, Urban Turban, came out in May 2012, followed by their ninth album, Hold On It's Easy, in February 2015. In July 2015, they released the single "Pinpoint" with Welsh singer Angharad Van Rijswijk, aka Accü.

In 2016, American vice-presidential candidate Tim Kaine talked at length to Rolling Stone magazine about how Cornershop is one of his favorite bands.

In 2017, the band released "Demon Is a Monster", an instrumental track and theme for the anti-Brexit podcast Remainiacs. The track was then released digitally. Cornershop are fiercely anti-Brexit. In March 2020, they released a new album, England Is a Garden to generally positive reviews. The first official video from the album accompanying the track "St Marie Under Canon" was released in February 2020.

The band released the single "Bounce and Salute", featuring Bubbley Kaur, in July 2026.

== Band members ==
Current members

- Tjinder Singh – vocals, guitars, bass, dholki (1991–present)
- Ben Ayres – guitars, tamboura, keyboards, tambourine, vocals (1991–present)
- Nick Simms – drums, vocals (1995–present)
- Peter Bengry – percussion (1995–present)
- Adam Blake – sitar, guitars (2009–present)
- Pete Downing – guitars (2009–present)
- James Milne – bass

Former members

- Avtar Singh – bass, guitars, vocals (1991–1995)
- David Chambers – drums (1991–1995)
- Anthony "Saffs" Saffery – sitar, guitars, keyboards (1994–2002)
- Wallis Healey – guitars (1994–1995)
- Pete Hall – percussion (1995)

== Discography ==
=== Albums ===
Release date	Title	Charts		Certifications
Release date	Title	UK	AUS	Certifications
31 January 1994	Hold On It Hurts	—	—	
23 October 1995	Woman's Gotta Have It	—	—	
8 September 1997	When I Was Born for the 7th Time	17	81	BPI: Gold
1 April 2002	Handcream for a Generation	30	—	
27 July 2009	Judy Sucks a Lemon for Breakfast	145	—	
14 March 2011	Cornershop and the Double 'O' Groove Of	—	—	
14 May 2012	Urban Turban	—	—	
2 February 2015	Hold On It's Easy	—	—	
6 March 2020	England Is a Garden	—	—	

=== Compilations ===
Release date	Title
19 July 1993	Elvis Sex-Change
4 March 2013	Snap Yr Cookies
22 April 2013	The Hot for May Sound

=== Singles and EPs ===
Release date	Title	Charts		Certifications	Album
Release date	Title	UK	AUS	Certifications	Album
11 January 1993	In the Days of Ford Cortina EP	82	—		Non-album singles
30 April 1993	Lock Stock & Double Barrel EP	79	—		Non-album singles
10 January 1994	"Reader's Wives"	91	—		Hold on It Hurts
28 March 1994	"Born Disco, Died Heavy Metal"	197	—		Hold on It Hurts
March, 1994	"Seetar Man" (split single with Blood Sausage)	—	—		Non-album single
17 April 1995	"6 a.m. Jullander Shere"	—	—		Woman's Gotta Have It
1995	"My Dancing Days Are Done" (split single with Prohibition)	—	—		Woman's Gotta Have It
26 February 1996	"6 a.m. Jullander Shere: The Grid and Star Liner Mixes"	—	—		Woman's Gotta Have It
24 June 1996	"W.O.G. – The U.S Western Oriental Mixes"	—	—		Woman's Gotta Have It
25 November 1996	"Butter the Soul"	—	—		When I Was Born for the 7th Time
9 June 1997	"Good Ships" / "Funky Days Are Back Again"	107	—		When I Was Born for the 7th Time
18 August 1997	"Brimful of Asha"	60	35	BPI: 2× Platinum	When I Was Born for the 7th Time
16 February 1998	"Brimful of Asha (Norman Cook Remix)"	1	—		When I Was Born for the 7th Time
4 May 1998	"Sleep on the Left Side"	23	—		When I Was Born for the 7th Time
26 October 1998	"Candyman"	—	—		When I Was Born for the 7th Time
4 March 2002	"Lessons Learned from Rocky I to Rocky III"	37	—		Handcream for a Generation
19 August 2002	"Staging (The Plaguing of the Raised Platform)"	80	—		Handcream for a Generation
26 July 2004	"Topknot" / "Natch" (Cornershop Presents Bubbley Kaur)	53	—		Cornershop and the Double 'O' Groove Of...
6 February 2006	"Wop the Groove" (featuring Rowetta)	145	—		Non-album single
25 May 2009	"The Roll Off Characteristics of History in the Making"	—	—		Judy Sucks a Lemon for Breakfast
3 May 2010	The School of Soul EP	—	—		Judy Sucks a Lemon for Breakfast
9 August 2010	"Brimful of Asher" (12" Bosom Mix by The Naked Ape)	—	—		Non-album singles
30 August 2010	"The Electronic E-Mail Mixes" (with Matsuki Ayumu)	—	—		Non-album singles
22 November 2010	The Battle of New Orleans EP	—	—		Non-album singles
17 January 2011	"Topknot" / "Natch" (reissue) (Cornershop Presents Bubbley Kaur)	—	—		Cornershop and the Double 'O' Groove Of...
14 February 2011	"United Provinces of India" (Cornershop Presents Bubbley Kaur)	—	—		Cornershop and the Double 'O' Groove Of...
9 May 2011	"Supercomputed" (Cornershop Presents Bubbley Kaur)	—	—		Cornershop and the Double 'O' Groove Of...
30 May 2011	"Non-Stop Radio" (featuring Celeste)	—	—		Urban Turban - The Singhles Club
27 17 June 2011	"What Did the Hippie Have in His Bag?" (featuring Castle Hill Primary)	—	—		Urban Turban - The Singhles Club
30 May 2011	"Non Stop Radio (The Italian Job Remixes)" (featuring Celeste)	—	—		Urban Turban - The Singhles Club
19 September 2011	"Don't Shake It (Let It Free)" (Cornershop Presents Bubbley Kaur)	—	—		Cornershop and the Double 'O' Groove Of...
9 April 2012	"Milkin' It" (featuring In Light of Aquarius)	—	—		Urban Turban - The Singhles Club
25 June 2012	"Who's Gonna Lite It Up" (featuring Izzy Lindqwister)	—	—		Urban Turban - The Singhles Club
9 July 2012	"Solid Gold" (featuring Katie)	—	—		Urban Turban - The Singhles Club
5 November 2012	"Something Makes You Feel Like" (featuring Soko)	—	—		Urban Turban - The Singhles Club
3 December 2012	"Every Year So Different" (featuring Trwbador)	—	—		Non-album singles
15 July 2015	"Pinpoint" (featuring Accü)	—	—		Non-album singles
4 December 2015	"Let the Good Times Roll"	—	—		Non-album singles
1 April 2016	Hold the Corner EP (featuring Mike Flowers Pops)	—	—		Non-album singles
20 October 2017	"Demon Is a Monster"	—	—		Non-album singles
27 July 2018	"Double Denim" / "Sugar Sugar"	—	—		Non-album singles
26 November 2019	"No Rock: Save in Roll"	—	—		England Is a Garden
27 January 2020	"St Marie Under Canon"	—	—		England Is a Garden
8 August 2025	"Amsterdam via Rotterdam"	—	—		
