= England Is a Garden =

Studio album by Cornershop
- Released: 6 March 2020
- Length: 48:20
- Label: Ample Play

Cornershop chronology
Hold On It's Easy (2015)	England Is a Garden (2020)

Professional ratings
Aggregate scores
Source	Rating
AnyDecentMusic?	7.6/10
Metacritic	82/100
Review scores
Source	Rating
AllMusic	4.5/5 stars
And It Don't Stop	(2-star Honorable Mention)
The Independent	4/5 stars
MusicOMH	3/5 stars
NME	3/5 stars
The Observer	4/5 stars

England Is a Garden is a studio album by British indie rock band Cornershop. It was released on 6 March 2020 under the band's own label, Ample Play Records.

The first single from the album, "No Rock: Save in Roll" was released on 26 November 2019.

== Critical reception ==
England Is a Garden was met with universal acclaim from critics. At Metacritic, which assigns a weighted average rating out of 100 to reviews from mainstream publications, this release received an average score of 82, based on 10 reviews.

AllMusic's Tim Sendra hailed England Is a Garden as Cornershop's "most cohesive and powerful record yet, full of songs that have a hearty punch to go along with their typically sharp hooks". Elisa Bray of The Independent found its "pan-cultural melting pot of juxtapositions" as "confrontational" and "musically ambitious" as the band's early work. Somewhat less impressed, Robert Christgau highlighted the songs "Everywhere That Wog Army Roam" and "The Cash Money" while offering as a summation that the band's singer and songwriter "Tjinder Singh fends off Brexit with his trademark hyperintelligent indirection, a tactic that doesn't work as well as it used to".

== Track listing ==
England Is a Garden track listing
No.	Title	Length
1.	"St Marie Under Canon"	4:12
2.	"Slingshot"	5:15
3.	"No Rock: Save in Roll"	3:42
4.	"Everywhere That Wog Army Roam"	5:09
5.	"King Kongs"	0:09
6.	"Highly Amplified"	4:49
7.	"England Is a Garden"	1:45
8.	"Cash Money"	5:19
9.	"Morning Ben"	0:18
10.	"I’m a Wooden Soldier"	5:00
11.	"One Uncareful Lady Owner"	3:52
12.	"The Holy Name"	8:50

== Charts ==
Chart performance for England Is a Garden
Chart (2020)	Peak position
Scottish Albums (OCC)	76
UK Independent Albums (OCC)	13
