= Fleadh Cheoil =

Annual Irish music competition

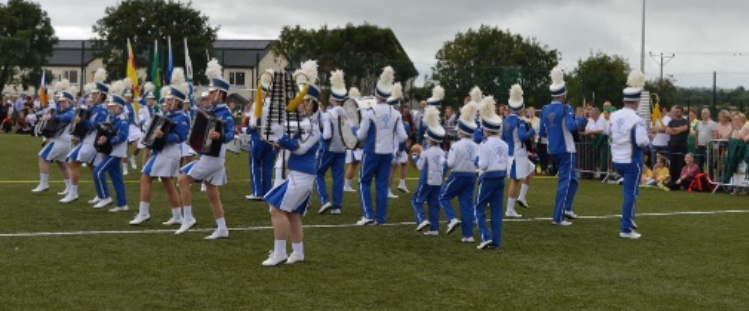
The Holy Cross Accordion Band Attical at the Fleadh Cheoil in 2014

The Fleadh Cheoil (Irish pronunciation: [ˌfʲlʲaː ˈçoːlʲ]), or "music festival" in English, is an annual Irish arts festival and competition run by Comhaltas Ceoltóirí Éireann (Irish pronunciation: [ˈkoːl̪ˠt̪ˠəsˠ ˈcoːl̪ˠt̪ˠoːɾʲiː ˈeːɾʲən̪ˠ]), a non-profit organisation that promotes the learning and performance of Irish traditional music and dance internationally and domestically. The group maintains branches in several countries.

Each year, a different town or city hosts the Fleadh Cheoil, giving musicians exposure to new styles and repertoire. Over the decades, the Fleadh has been held in large cities, towns and rural villages, Mullingar, Sligo, and Tullamore, among many others.

The competition, often seen as the most prestigious and "serious" part of the event, is held alongside a parade, impromptu sessions and performances by musicians of global renown, many of them previous All-Ireland winners. Public sessions occur spontaneously throughout the hosting town, with musicians on street corners, in pubs, restaurants and other public places. Competitors and attendees come from across Ireland, as well as many European countries, including Spain and the UK, and from the USA, Canada, Australia, New Zealand, Japan and others.

There are various stages within the competition, with local prerequisite titles required before competing at the Fleadh. In Ireland, county and provincial competitions lead to the Fleadh.

Competitions are held in solo and duo categories, divided into the following age ranges: under 12, 12–15, 15–18, over 18 (senior), U-18, Any Age, U-18, U-9, 9–11, 11–13, 13–15, 15–18 (for Cómhra) and O-35.

== Fleadhanna around the world ==
=== Great Britain ===
Since its establishment in 1957, Comhaltas in Britain has held regional fleadhanna followed by a national fleadh, the All-Britain Fleadh (Fleadh Cheoil na Breataine in Irish, stages of qualification prior to the All-Ireland. The organisation's charitable status was recognised in England and Wales in 2019, followed by charity registration in Scotland in 2024.

=== North America ===
The North American branches of Comhaltas Ceoltóirí Éireann oversee two regional, pre-All-Ireland qualifying events: the Mid-Atlantic Fleadh (for residents of the Eastern Seaboard of the United States and eastern Canada) and the Midwest Fleadh (covering most of the rest of North America). The latter is not restricted to the American Midwest, as it caters to regions with historically prominent Irish populations and music scenes, including Atlanta, Cleveland, Chicago, Detroit, San Francisco and St. Louis. Winners in any category at these festivals may be considered for entry into the All-Ireland Fleadh Cheoil, the most prestigious level of the system.

== History ==
The first national festival of Irish traditional music was held in Mullingar in 1951. At its inaugural meeting in September 1951, Comhaltas Ceoltóirí Éireann chose the title Fleadh Cheoil, aiming to create a great national festival of traditional music. The fleadh has since been held in many venues.

In the years that followed, the number of competitors grew so large that qualifying stages had to be arranged at county and provincial levels. Fleadh Nua (the new fleadh), Fleadh na Breataine (the All-Britain fleadh), regional fleadhanna in Britain, and two major fleadhanna in the USA also became annual Comhaltas events.

From its beginning, the goal of the Fleadh Cheoil was to establish standards in Irish traditional music through competition. The fleadh developed as a mainly competitive event, but it also included concerts, céilíthe, parades, and sessions.

Today, fleadhanna at each level provide a platform and meeting place for thousands of musicians, singers and dancers who carry on the tradition. Around 20,000 performers compete each year.

The 2008 festival was held in Tullamore, County Offaly, and attracted an estimated 250,000 people, making it Ireland's largest festival. The Fleadh was in Sligo in 2014 and 2015.

The 2016 festival was held in Ennis, County Clare, and attracted an estimated 400,000 people over the nine days from 14 to 22 August. President Michael D. Higgins attended. Ten thousand musicians took part, with 6,000 competing in 180 All-Ireland competitions. An estimated €38 million was spent as 80,000 people were in Ennis at any one time. There were 28 concerts, five of them in the 2,000-seat Shannon Aerodome at Tim Smythe Park. The 2017 Fleadh Cheoil returned to Ennis from 13 to 21 August. The festival was opened by Michael Flatley, and over 450,000 people visited, peaking on the Saturday.

A record-setting fleadh took place in 2025 in Wexford, attracting over 800,000 people.

This was surpassed in 2026, when more than 1.65 million people to the first ever Fleadh in Belfast. The 2027 Fleadh is also confirmed for Belfast.

== Competition categories ==
According to Comhaltas Ceoltóirí Éireann's official rules for 2026:

Solo competitions are held for the following instruments: fiddle, button accordion, flute, whistle, piano accordion, concertina, uileann pipes, Irish harp, mouth organ, banjo, mandolin, piano, melodeon, miscellaneous (instruments not named here), and in accompaniment category: bódhrán and céilí drums.
Solo competitions for slow airs are held for the following instruments: fiddle; uileann pipes, flute, whistle and Irish harp.
Solo competitions are held at all age levels for traditional singing in Irish (sean nos) and in English, also for whistling and lilting, as well as for newly-composed songs and tunes in Irish traditional style.

Ensemble competitions include duet, trio, céilí band, instrumental group (grupaí cheoil), accordion band, pipe band, flute band and miscellaneous ensemble.

Dance competitions include céilí dancing, set dancing and sean nós solo dancing (all with smooth shoes, no tips). Storytelling and conversational Irish language competitions also exist.

The full rule set, which may change from year to year, is available from the Comhaltas website through the News section. Comhaltas has a constitution (bunreacht) in Irish.

== Application ==
Towns and cities wishing to host the Fleadh Cheoil must submit several applications to Ardchomhairle an Chomaltais, the highest committee within Comhaltas. Members of the Ardchomhairle inspect applicant towns and proposed venues before making a final decision several weeks after the preceding fleadh, usually in September.

Once chosen, a town undertakes to host the festival for two consecutive years. Comhaltas may deny the second year if poor venues or organisational problems are evident in the first.

On 10 September 2011, the 2012 All-Ireland Fleadh Cheoil was awarded to Cavan, County Cavan, for the third year in succession. Other applicants were Ennis, County Clare, and Sligo, County Sligo. The Fleadh was held in Derry in 2013, the first time that it was held in Northern Ireland, partly due to the city's UK City of Culture. In 2014, it was confirmed that Sligo would host the Fleadh in 2014 and 2015. Ennis hosted in 2016 and 2017, with Drogheda hosting in 2018 and 2019. Mullingar was planned to host in 2020 and 2021, but both were cancelled due to COVID-19 in Ireland, and finally hosted in 2022, the first in-person Fleadh since 2019.

An online "FleadhFest" took place in 2021, with a showpiece in Sligo. The 2023 All-Ireland Fleadh also took place in Mullingar for a second consecutive year; Belfast and Wexford made unsuccessful bids. In 2024, it moved to Wexford. It returned to Wexford in 2025, and then to Belfast in 2026.

== See also ==
- Comhaltas Ceoltóirí Éireann
- List of All-Ireland Fleadh champions
- List of venues for All-Ireland Fleadh Cheoil na hÉireann
