= Brassy (band) =

British rock/hip hop band

- Origin: Manchester, England
- Genres: Alternative rock, alternative hip hop
- Years active: 1994–2003
- Labels: Costermonger, Wiiija
- Members: Muffin Spencer; Stefan Gordon; Karen Frost; Jonny Barrington

Brassy were an English rock/hip hop band, formed in 1994 in Manchester. The band was composed of Singer-guitarist Muffin Spencer, guitarist Stefan Gordon, bassist-backing singer Karen Frost and drummer Jonny Barrington (aka DJ Swett).

The band split up in 2003 after releasing 2 studio albums.

== History ==
Muffin Spencer, younger sister of Jon Spencer (of Jon Spencer Blues Explosion), at the age of 17 moved from New Hampshire to Manchester, England in 1986 where she formed The Exuberants with David Walker and Stefan Gordon after placing an advert in Affleck's Palace. They eventually enlisted drummer Jonny Barrington. They released the album Led The Way in 1992 via Native Records before splitting up.

Spencer, Gordon and Barrington went on to form Brassy in 1994 and enlisted Karen Frost in 1995 after Spencer spotted her at a Hole gig at Manchester Academy on 30 April 1995 despite being unable to play at the time. Spencer stated that she had "gone to the gig with the sole intention of finding a female who could learn to play bass. We had lads in the group and I wanted another girl in there". The band signed to Costermonger and released 3 singles before signing to Wiiija. Complaining about their former label and changing musical influences, Spencer stated that "there’s always been a hip-hop element to our music. It’s a matter of having a budget and being able to use tools and studios that you don’t really have when you’re on a label called Costermonger… I think they still exist".

The band released their debut album Got It Made in 2000. Their 2000 track "Play Some D" was re-released in 2003 after it was used in the 'Hellomoto' ad campaign by Motorola, leading to renewed interest in the band, and the recording of a second album, Gettin Wise. Gettin Wise received a mixed response from critics, and proved to be their final album, with the band members all finding themselves in debt after recording it. The band members had to get day jobs, with Spencer and Frost moving to Manhattan, and Gordon moving to London. Spencer worked in a coffee shop.

The band's last tour was in the USA in October 2003 as part of the "Girlz Garage" tour. By this point Gordon and Frost had left the band, with session bass player Kai Custodio touring with the band.

Commenting in 2021 on the band, Spencer stated that "it was hard. We really cared about it, so we fought to do everything the way we thought it should be done. I think that intrinsically makes it harder to do. So, we didn't take it easy on ourselves and it was tough" and that "we were just broke, and it just got really hard. We went our separate ways because we just couldn't hack it anymore". When asked about a reunion, Spencer responded "Oh, I don't know. I'd play with the other three. But I'm not interested in playing with anybody else".

In 2009, Spencer owned a coffee shop at Irving 71 Place in New York City and complained about customers expecting free internet stating that ""we have writers and so forth in here who already take up table space. We don't have room for that".

In 2020, Stefan Gordon and Karen Frost along with Lol Hammond formed Are We Superheroes?.

== Discography ==
=== Albums ===
- Got It Made (11 July 2000), Wiija WIJ 1111
- Gettin Wise (12 May 2003), Wiija WIJ 1131

=== Singles ===
- "Boss" b/w Route Out (Mar 1996), Costermonger COST 7 (#194 UK)
- "Straighten Out" b/w Right Back (Jul 1996), Costermonger COST 8 (#198 UK)
- "Sure Thing" b/w (remix) (1997), Costermonger COST 10
- Bonus Beats EP (24 May 1999) (Containing Good Times/Secrets/Back in Business/Bonus Beat), Wiija WIJ 98
- "Good Times" (1999) Wiija WIJ 88
- "I Can't Wait" (23 Aug 1999), Wiija WIJ 103 (#136 UK)
- "Work It Out" (28 February 2000), Wiija WIJ 109 (#88 UK)
- "B'Cos We Rock" (Jul 2000), Wiija WIJ 121
- Play Some D EP (16 Oct 2000), Wiija WIJ 123 (#179 UK)
- "Play Some D" (31 March 2003), Wiija WIJ 133 (#88 UK)
