= Brimful of Asha =

1997 single by Cornershop

Single by Cornershop

from the album When I Was Born for the 7th Time
- B-side: "Easy Winners"; "Rehoused"; "Counteraction"
- Released: 18 August 1997
- Studio: West Orange (Preston, Lancashire, England)
- Genre: Indie pop; indie rock; Britpop
- Length: 5:17 (album version); 4:07 (single version)
- Label: Wiiija
- Songwriter: Tjinder Singh
- Producer: Tjinder Singh

Cornershop singles chronology
"Good Ships" (1997)	"Brimful of Asha" (1997)	"Brimful of Asha (Norman Cook remix)" (1998)

Music video
- "Brimful of Asha" on YouTube

"Brimful of Asha" is a song by English alternative rock band Cornershop from their third album, When I Was Born for the 7th Time (1997). The recording, released by Wiiija, originally reached number 60 on the UK Singles Chart in 1997. After a remixed version by Norman Cook (Fatboy Slim) became a radio and critical success, the song was re-released and reached number one on the UK chart and number 16 on the US Billboard Modern Rock Tracks chart. It was the fifth best-selling Britpop song of the 1990s.

The lyrics are a tribute to the Indian singer Asha Bhosle. The BBC stated, "the reason this hit by British Asian band Cornershop is significant [...] is that it marks a point where two types of popular culture were finally brought together in the UK charts: namely, Indie rock and Bollywood film."

== Background ==
This song is based on the history of film culture in India. Since their beginnings, Indian films have relied heavily on song-and-dance numbers. The singing is almost always performed by background singers while the actors and actresses lip sync. Asha Bhosle was a playback singer who sang over 12,000 songs and is referred to as "Sadi rani" (Punjabi for "our queen") at one point in the lyrics. In the slower, original album recording, playback singers Lata Mangeshkar (her elder sister) and Mohammed Rafi (one of the top male playback singers of the mid-century) are mentioned. The lyrics in the bridge contain a number of references to non-Indian music, including Georges Brassens' song "Les Amoureux des bancs publics", Jacques Dutronc, Marc Bolan, Argo Records and Trojan Records.

== Critical reception ==
Kevin Courtney from Irish Times named "Brimful of Asha" Single of the Week, adding, "This three-chord paean to the joy of vinyl is already a classic, but Fatboy Slim's bouncy, big beat remix will plant the tune firmly on to the dance-floor and give Cornershop a much-deserved commercial boost." British magazine Music Week rated the original version of the song five out of five, writing, "The Asian-rock outfit deliver their most compulsive slice of pop to date, mixing a Velvet Underground-style groove with a truly ticklesome lyric, strings and a top tune." In 1998, also Music Week named the Norman Cook remix Single of the Week, adding that his remix of this "hugely infectious tune stands out and will at last provide Cornershop with a much-deserved big break. Stock up—this one will surely fly."

A reviewer from NME commented, "Sadly not a song about the joys of chain-smoking, but in fact a celebration of the Asian music and films of our Tjinder's youth. The cognoscenti of the youth revolution will no doubt have heard this already on either its previous release or the album, but this may be the record to take the 'Shop into the crazy Global Hypermarket of the Top Ten. Not because it's a marvellously infectious good-time dance pop number, but because it repeats the line, "Everybody needs a bosom for a pillow"." James Hyman of Record Mirror gave the remix five out of five and named it Tune of the Week, remarking that "this gentle jangly big beat brew certainly hooks with its Everybody needs a bosom for a pillow mantra." He concluded, "Seriously a monster!" David Fricke from Rolling Stone said, "You can almost smell the weed that went into the rhythms and smiles of "Good Shit" and "Brimful of Asha"." OMD frontman Andy McCluskey praised the track, saying, "You cannot not want to dance to that song, it's just infectious."

== Music video ==
The accompanying music video for the song was directed by Phil Harder and produced by Harder/Fuller Films. It was filmed in a house in Lewisham, London. In the video, a teenage girl listens to several 45 rpm singles at home and dances to the music while the band performs on their covers, all of which display either the song title or snippets from the lyrics.

== Norman Cook remix ==
"Brimful of Asha" (Norman Cook remix)

Single by Cornershop
- B-side: "u47's"
- Released: 16 February 1998
- Genre: Big beat; dance-rock
- Length: 4:03 (single version); 7:35 (extended version)
- Label: Wiiija
- Songwriter: Tjinder Singh
- Producer: Tjinder Singh

Cornershop singles chronology
"Brimful of Asha" (1997)	"Brimful of Asha" (Norman Cook remix) (1998)	"Sleep on the Left Side" (1998)

Music video
- "Brimful of Asha" (Norman Cook remix) on YouTube

English DJ Norman Cook, known as Fatboy Slim, was asked to remix "Brimful of Asha", which he did by speeding it up and modulating the song to a higher key (halfway between B-flat and B, rather than in A). This new version was realized by sampling the Dave Pike Set's 1970 song "Raga Jeeva Swara" and the Monkees' 1966 song "Mary, Mary". The remix was released as a standalone single and became a number-one single on the UK Singles Chart in February 1998.

In 2003, Q ranked the Fatboy Slim remix at number 840 in their list of the "1001 Best Songs Ever" and in 2004 it featured it in their "The 1010 Songs You Must Own". In October 2011, NME placed it at number 105 on its list "150 Best Tracks of the Past 15 Years". In August 2010, Pitchfork placed the remix at number 113 in their list of "The Top 200 Tracks of the 1990s". NME ranked the remix at number 2 in their list of "The 50 Best Remixes Ever", saying it "does what the truly great remixes do – render you unable to enjoy the original". The remix was included in Pitchfork's 2010 list of "25 Great Remixes" of the 1990s.

== Track listings ==
=== 1997 ===
UK and European CD1

1. "Brimful of Asha" (short version/radio friendly edit) – 3:31
2. "Easy Winners" (part 1) – 4:43
3. "Rehoused" – 4:05
4. "Brimful of Asha" (Sofa Surfers Solid State radio mix) – 5:17

UK and European CD2

1. "Brimful of Asha" (album version) – 5:16
2. "Easy Winners" (part 2) – 5:56
3. "Counteraction" – 2:44
4. "Brimful of Asha" (Mucho Macho Bolan Boogie mix) – 6:48

UK 7-inch single

A. "Brimful of Asha" (short version)
B. "Easy Winners" (part 1)

=== 1998 ===
UK and Australian CD single; UK 12-inch single

1. "Brimful of Asha" (single version)
2. "Brimful of Asha" (Norman Cook remix single version)
3. "u47's"
4. "Brimful of Asha" (Norman Cook remix extended version)

UK 7-inch and cassette single

1. "Brimful of Asha" (single version)
2. "Brimful of Asha" (Norman Cook remix single version)

European CD single

1. "Brimful of Asha" (Norman Cook remix single version)
2. "Brimful of Asha" (single version)

Japanese CD single

1. "Brimful of Asha" (Norman Cook full length remix)
2. "Brimful of Asha" (Mucho Macho Bolan Boogie mix)
3. "Brimful of Asha" (Sofa Surfers Solid State radio mix)
4. "Easy Winners" (part 1)
5. "Easy Winners" (part 2)
6. "u47's"

== Charts ==
=== Weekly charts ===
Chart (1998)	Peak position
Australia (ARIA)	35
Belgium (Ultratip Bubbling Under Wallonia)	5
Denmark (IFPI)	15
Europe (Eurochart Hot 100)	12
Finland (Suomen virallinen lista)	20
Germany (GfK)	84
Hungary (Mahasz)	8
Iceland (Íslenski Listinn Topp 40)	5
Ireland (IRMA)	3
Italy (Musica e dischi)	9
Italy Airplay (Music & Media)	4
Netherlands (Dutch Top 40 Tipparade)	21
Netherlands (Single Top 100)	83
New Zealand (Recorded Music NZ)	26
Norway (VG-lista)	18
Scottish Singles Sales (Official Charts)	1
Sweden (Sverigetopplistan)	36
UK Singles (Official Charts)	1
UK Indie (Official Charts)	1
US Maxi-Singles Sales (Billboard) with "Sleep on the Left Side"	35
US Modern Rock Tracks (Billboard)	16

=== Year-end charts ===
Chart (1998)	Position
Iceland (Íslenski Listinn Topp 40)	55
UK Singles (OCC)	20
US Modern Rock Tracks (Billboard)	56

== Certifications ==
Region	Certification	Certified units/sales
New Zealand (RMNZ)	Gold	15,000^{‡}
United Kingdom (BPI)	2× Platinum	634,000
^{‡} Sales+streaming figures based on certification alone.

== Release history ==
Region	Version	Date	Format(s)	Label(s)	Ref.
United Kingdom	Original	18 August 1997	7-inch; CD	Wiiija	
United States	Original	15 September 1997	Alternative radio	Luaka Bop; Warner Bros.	
United States	Original	16 January 1998	Adult top 40; modern adult radio	Luaka Bop; Warner Bros.	
United States	Original	20 January 1998	Contemporary hit radio	Luaka Bop; Warner Bros.	
United Kingdom	Norman Cook remix	16 February 1998	7-inch; CD; cassette	Wiiija	
Japan	Norman Cook remix	25 March 1998	CD	Luaka Bop; Warner Bros.; Wiiija	
