= Hold On It Hurts =

Studio album by Cornershop
- Released: 31 January 1994
- Studios: Suite 16 (Rochdale); The Green Room (Brighton); Stayfree (Leicester); West Orange (Preston)
- Genre: Indie rock
- Length: 34:42
- Label: Wiiija
- Producers: John Wills; John Robb; Tjinder Singh

Cornershop chronology
Elvis Sex-Change (1993)	Hold On It Hurts (1994)	Woman's Gotta Have It (1995)

Singles from Hold On It Hurts
- 1. "Readers' Wives" Released: 10 January 1994; 2. "Born Disco; Died Heavy Metal" Released: 28 March 1994

Professional ratings
Review scores
Source	Rating
AllMusic	4/5 stars
The New Rolling Stone Album Guide	3/5 stars

Hold On It Hurts is the debut studio album by English indie rock band Cornershop. It was released on 31 January 1994 through Wiiija. The album failed to reach commercial success, but went some way in helping the band find its niche in the following years.

== Reception ==
In CMJ New Music Monthly, Franklin Bruno said, "Cornershop uses its sitar the same way the Velvets sometimes used John Cale's viola: as another noisemaker among already chaotic, often atonal guitars. Many songs are conventional noise-rock, blending English pop-cultural references and incendiary sloganeering over bass and drums right off of Psychocandy"

== Track listing ==
All lyrics written by Tjinder Singh; all music composed by Cornershop, except where noted.

1. "Jason Donovan/Tessa Sanderson" – 2:31
2. "Kalluri's Radio" – 4:20
3. "Readers' Wives" – 3:40
4. "Change" – 1:57
5. "Inside Rani" – 3:22
6. "Born Disco; Died Heavy Metal" – 3:40
7. "Counteraction" – 2:42
8. "Where D'U Get Your Information" – 3:16
9. "Tera Mera Pyar" – 2:04
10. "You Always Said My Language Would Get Me into Trouble" – 7:07

US bonus tracks (Lock Stock & Double~Barrel EP)

11. "England's Dreaming" – 3:36
12. "Trip Easy" – 2:59
13. "Summer Fun in a Beat Up Datsun" (Lyrics by Ben Ayres, music by Cornershop) – 1:31
14. "Breaking Every Rule Language English" – 3:17

== Personnel ==
Cornershop

- Tjinder Singh – vocals, bass
- Avtar Singh – guitar
- Ben Ayres – guitar, vocals
- Wallis Healey – guitar
- Anthony "Saffs" Saffery – sitar, keyboards
- David Chambers – drums

Other musicians

- Emma Davies – keyboards
- Alastair Dickins – clarinet
- Raj Patel – dholki
- Dale Shaw – vocals

Technical

- John Wills – production (tracks 1., 2., 4., 6., 8.)
- Tjinder Singh – production (tracks 3., 5., 7., 9., 10.)
- John Robb – co-production (tracks 1., 2., 4. – 6., 8.), production (Lock Stock & Double~Barrel EP)
- Richard Whelan – engineering
- Andy Green – engineering
- Kevin Reverb – engineering
- Rob – engineering
- Charlie – engineering
- Rex – engineering (Lock Stock & Double~Barrel EP)
- Mike Marsh – mastering
- Malcolm Maybury – front cover photo
- Lloyd Thomas – inner sleeve art
