= List of venues for All-Ireland Fleadh Cheoil na hÉireann =

A complete list of locations that have been the venue of the All-Ireland Fleadh, also known as Fleadh Cheoil na hÉireann:

	Town	County	Host year
1	Mullingar	County Westmeath	1951
2	Clones	County Monaghan	1952
3	Athlone	County Westmeath	1953
4	Cavan	County Cavan	1954
5	Loughrea	County Galway	1955
6	Ennis	County Clare	1956
7	Dungarvan	County Waterford	1957
8	Longford	County Longford	1958
9	Thurles	County Tipperary	1959
10	Boyle	County Roscommon	1960
11	Swinford	County Mayo	1961
12	Gorey	County Wexford	1962
13	Mullingar	County Westmeath	1963
14	Clones	County Monaghan	1964
15	Thurles	County Tipperary	1965
16	Boyle	County Roscommon	1966
17	Enniscorthy	County Wexford	1967
18	Clones	County Monaghan	1968
19	Cashel	County Tipperary	1969
20	Listowel	County Kerry	1970
21	Dublin (Postponed and held June 1972)	County Dublin	1971
22	Listowel	County Kerry	1972
23	Listowel	County Kerry	1973
24	Listowel	County Kerry	1974
25	Buncrana	County Donegal	1975
26	Buncrana	County Donegal	1976
27	Ennis	County Clare	1977
28	Listowel	County Kerry	1978
29	Buncrana	County Donegal	1979
30	Buncrana	County Donegal	1980
31	Listowel	County Kerry	1981
32	Listowel	County Kerry	1982
33	Kilkenny	County Kilkenny	1983
34	Kilkenny	County Kilkenny	1984
35	Listowel	County Kerry	1985
36	Listowel	County Kerry	1986
37	Listowel	County Kerry	1987
38	Kilkenny	County Kilkenny	1988
39	Sligo	County Sligo	1989
40	Sligo	County Sligo	1990
41	Sligo	County Sligo	1991
42	Clonmel	County Tipperary	1992
43	Clonmel	County Tipperary	1993
44	Clonmel	County Tipperary	1994
45	Listowel	County Kerry	1995
46	Listowel	County Kerry	1996
47	Ballina	County Mayo	1997
48	Ballina	County Mayo	1998
49	Enniscorthy	County Wexford	1999
50	Enniscorthy	County Wexford	2000
51	Listowel	County Kerry	2001
52	Listowel	County Kerry	2002
53	Clonmel	County Tipperary	2003
54	Clonmel	County Tipperary	2004
55	Letterkenny	County Donegal	2005
56	Letterkenny	County Donegal	2006
57	Tullamore	County Offaly	2007
58	Tullamore	County Offaly	2008
59	Tullamore	County Offaly	2009
60	Cavan	County Cavan	2010
61	Cavan	County Cavan	2011
62	Cavan	County Cavan	2012
63	Derry	County Londonderry (The first Fleadh held in Northern Ireland)	2013
64	Sligo	County Sligo	2014
65	Sligo	County Sligo	2015
66	Ennis	County Clare	2016
67	Ennis	County Clare	2017
68	Drogheda	County Louth	2018
69	Drogheda	County Louth	2019
70	Mullingar	County Westmeath	2022
71	Mullingar	County Westmeath	2023
72	Wexford	County Wexford	2024
73	Wexford	County Wexford	2025
74	Belfast	County Antrim /County Down	2026
