= Woman's Gotta Have It =

Studio album by Cornershop
- Released: 23 October 1995
- Studios: West Orange (Preston); Stayfree (Leicester)
- Genres: Indie rock; raga rock
- Length: 51:17
- Label: Wiiija
- Producer: Tjinder Singh

Cornershop chronology
Hold On It Hurts (1994)	Woman's Gotta Have It (1995)	When I Was Born for the 7th Time (1997)

Alternative cover
- Cover of U.S. issue

Singles from Woman's Gotta Have It
- 1. "6am Jullander Shere" Released: 17 April 1995; 2. "Wog" Released: 1996

Woman's Gotta Have It is the second studio album by English indie rock band Cornershop. It was released on 23 October 1995 through Wiiija.

== Recording and release ==
The song "My Dancing Days Are Done" is performed in French (mes jours de bal perdus) by the guest singers Parsley and Sasha Andres. The album's style is a blend of indie rock with Indian music.

The opening track "6am Jullandar Shere", sung in Punjabi, as well as "Wog" were released as singles. A video for the former was sometimes played on MTV Europe's alternative music slots.

== Reception ==
Professional ratings
Review scores
Source	Rating
AllMusic	4/5 stars
Robert Christgau	A−
The New Rolling Stone Album Guide	3.5/5 stars

Reviewing the album on AllMusic, Denise Sullivan said, "Cornershop has created the perfect hybrid of Western indie rock and swirling Eastern traditional music: Hindi-pop. It's not like what the Beatles did with sitars nor is it classifiable as worldbeat: Cornershop is unique." CMJ New Music Monthly said the album "could be one of the best things you'll buy all year. The album is a rare case of a band getting, well, better."

== Track listing ==
All tracks are written by Tjinder Singh.

No.	Title	Length
1.	"6am Jullandar Shere"	6:22
2.	"Hong Kong Book of Kung Fu"	3:23
3.	"Roof Rack"	3:48
4.	"My Dancing Days Are Done"	3:30
5.	"Call All Destroyer"	3:24
6.	"Camp Orange"	3:48
7.	"Wog"	3:12
8.	"Jansimran King"	3:34
9.	"Looking for a Way In"	7:48
10.	"7:20am Jullandar Shere" (The song "7:20am Jullandar Shere" ends at minute 9:45. The hidden track "Never Leave Yrself Open" begins at minute 9:55.)	13:15

== Personnel ==
- Tjinder Singh – vocals, bass
- Avtar Singh – guitar
- Ben Ayres – guitar
- Wallis Healey – guitar
- Anthony "Saffs" Saffery – sitar, keyboards
- Nick Simms – drums
- Pete Hall – percussion
- Parsley – vocals
- Sasha Andres – vocals

Technical

- Tjinder Singh – production
- Charlie – engineering
- Mike Marsh – mastering
- Ben Ayres – artwork
- Alison – artwork
