= Urban Turban =

Urban Turban - The Singhles Club

Studio album by Cornershop
- Released: 14 May 2012
- Recorded: Sassy P Studios, London and West Orange Studios, Preston.
- Genre: Alternative, pop, hip-hop
- Length: 49:40
- Label: Ample Play
- Producer: Tjinder Singh

Cornershop chronology
Cornershop and the Double 'O' Groove Of (2011)	Urban Turban - The Singhles Club (2012)	Snap Yr Cookies (2013)

Urban Turban (subtitled Urban Turban - The Singhles Club) is a 2012 studio album by the British band Cornershop. It follows their 2011 album Cornershop and the Double 'O' Groove Of. Like their previous effort, the album consists mostly of collaborations; however, unlike its predecessor, which consisted solely of music with vocalist Bubbley Kaur, Urban Turban includes a variety of collaborators, including SoKo and Amar. The album originated as a project called The Singhles Club, in which the band sent subscribers a new song on a monthly basis via e-mail along with unique cover art. All six tracks from this project appear on the album.

== Reception ==
Professional ratings
Aggregate scores
Source	Rating
Metacritic	72/100
Review scores
Source	Rating
AllMusic	3/5 stars
NME	8/10 stars
Rolling Stone	3/5 stars
Spin	8/10 stars

NME reviewer Chris Parkin said that the album "is more grin-inducing than a piano-playing cat", awarding the album 8/10. BBC Music, though lamenting "the occasional meander" and expressing their need for "a bigger production budget", said that "there's nobody remotely like them and few who seem to actually enjoy being in a band more".

Pitchfork rated the album 7/10, saying the album "feels especially emblematic of a band that's fully liberated itself from any commercial or audience expectations and shifted its experimental ethos into overdrive". They were complimentary of tracks such as Something Makes You Feel Like, calling it "lovely" and complimenting its "restless, bleary-eyed vocal turn by French singer Soko that's offset by an easy-going Sweet Jane groove", but criticised other tracks such as "the annoyingly repetitious French-touch house of Solid Gold and the all-too aptly titled Milkin' It". The A.V. Club were also fairly complimentary, calling the album "creative and fun", but also called it "a little half-baked, and ultimately impersonal", rating it a B−.

== Track listing ==
All songs credited to Tjinder Singh except where noted. Tracks with a * indicate that it was a part of The Singhles Club.

1. "What Did the Hippie Have in His Bag?" (featuring Castle Hill Primary)* - 4:12
2. "Who's Gonna Lite It Up?" (featuring Izzy Lindqwister)* - 3:50 (Tjinder Singh and Izzy Lindqwister)
3. "Non-Stop Radio" (featuring Celeste)* - 4:14
4. "Solid Gold" (featuring Katie)* - 4:26
5. "Beacon Radio 303" (featuring Rajwant)* - 3:10 (Tjinder Singh and Rajwant)
6. "Milkin' It" (featuring In Light of Aquarius) - 4:29 (Tjinder Singh, Ben Ayres and Richie Deeney)
7. "Concrete, Concrete" (featuring Kay Kwong)* - 3:49
8. "Something Makes You Feel Like" (featuring SoKo) - 4:33 (Tjinder Singh, Ben Ayres and SoKo)
9. "Inspector Bamba Singh's Lament" (featuring Amar) - 4:27 (Tjinder Singh and Amar)
10. "Dedicated" (featuring Lorraine) - 3:45
11. "What Did the Hippie Have in His Bag - The High Slung Satchel" [featuring Castle Hill Primary] - 5:16
12. First Wog on the Moon - 3:29
