= Sheema Mukherjee =

British composer and sitar player

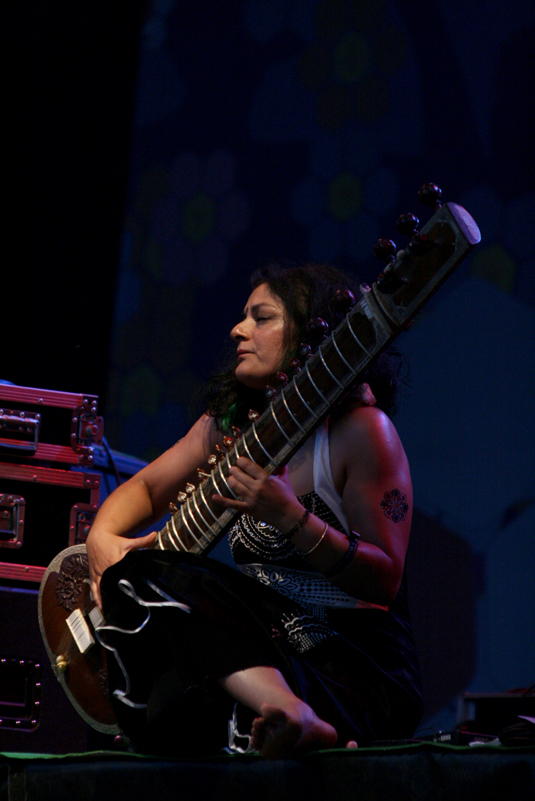
- Sheema Mukherjee in concert, 2008

Background information
- Instrument: Sitar
- Years active: 1998 – present
- Website: mukherjee.co.uk

Sheema Mukherjee is a British composer and sitar player. She is best known for her work with musical collective Transglobal Underground and The Imagined Village. She is the niece of sitarist Nikhil Banerjee. In 2005, Billboard referred to her as a "sitar prodigy".

Mukherjee studied Hindustani classical music under her uncle Nikhil Banerjee, Ali Akbar Khan and later Aashish Khan. In 1998 she joined Transglobal Underground. In 2005, she composed the music for the West Yorkshire Playhouse productions Gluey and the Lion and Non-Contact Time. She also composed the score for the Tamasha Theatre Company's 2009 musical Wuthering Heights. Her composition "Bending the Dark" was featured during the 2012 Summer Olympics.

Her first solo debut album, Sheema, was released on 28 August 2014 by the independent vinyl label ECC100 Records and was well received.
