= Fleadh Nua =

Music and culture festival in Ireland

Fleadh Nua (Irish pronunciation: [ˌfʲlʲaː ˈn̪ˠuə], flah-NOO-ah; meaning "New festival") is a festival of Irish culture which has been held annually during May in Ennis, County Clare, Ireland since 1974. It was started in Dublin in 1970. The Fleadh's purpose is to promote Irish traditional music and culture. Activities include music concerts, céilithe (dances), dance workshops and street entertainment.

The Fleadh Nua is organised by Comhaltas Ceoltóirí Éireann. It has expanded to be a nine-day event with events every day for all including Ciorcal Comhrá, Café music sessions, lunchtime concerts, Foinn Seisiún and evening sessions.
