= Wiiija =

British record label

Wiiija (Note: /ˈwiːdʒə/ WEE-jə) was a British independent record label founded in 1988 by staff from the Rough Trade Shop in Notting Hill, London. The name Wiiija is a corruption of W11 1JA, the postcode of the Rough Trade Shop in Talbot Street. It was run by Gary Walker, a sales assistant at the shop.

The label released two early mini-albums by the band Therapy?, and the first records by Silverfish, Huggy Bear and Cornershop. Cornershop's third album, When I Was Born for the Seventh Time, saw international success. Notable later releases included Free Kitten and Bis.

Wiiija became loosely associated with the early UK riot grrrl scene as a result of releases by Huggy Bear and Blood Sausage, as well as the Some Hearts Paid To Lie EP which featured Comet Gain, Skinned Teen, Linus and Pussycat Trash.

In 1996 it became a subsidiary of Beggars Banquet Records, and remained active until the early 2000s.

== Artists ==
- Action Swingers
- Anjali
- Bastard Kestrel
- Bis
- Blood Sausage
- Brassy
- Comet Gain
- Cornershop
- Fabric
- Free Kitten
- Jacob's Mouse
- Loveblobs
- Mucho Macho
- Silverfish
- Sgt Rock
- Sun Carriage
- Terminal Cheesecake
- Terry Edwards
- Therapy?
- Thule
- Velocette
- Whistler

== See also ==
- Lists of record labels
- List of independent UK record labels

== Other sources ==
- Young, Rob. Rough Trade. Black Dog Publishing. ISBN 1-904772-47-1
