= 1953 Salford City Council election =

Local election in Salford

- 7 May 1953

16 of 64 seats on Salford City Council 33 seats needed for a majority
	First party	Second party
Party	Labour	Conservative
Last election	15 seats, 59.1%	1 seat, 37.0%
Seats before	49	15
Seats won	13	3
Seats after	52	12
Seat change	▲3	▼3
Popular vote	31,578	25,035
Percentage	54.3%	43.1%
Swing	▼4.8%	▲6.1%
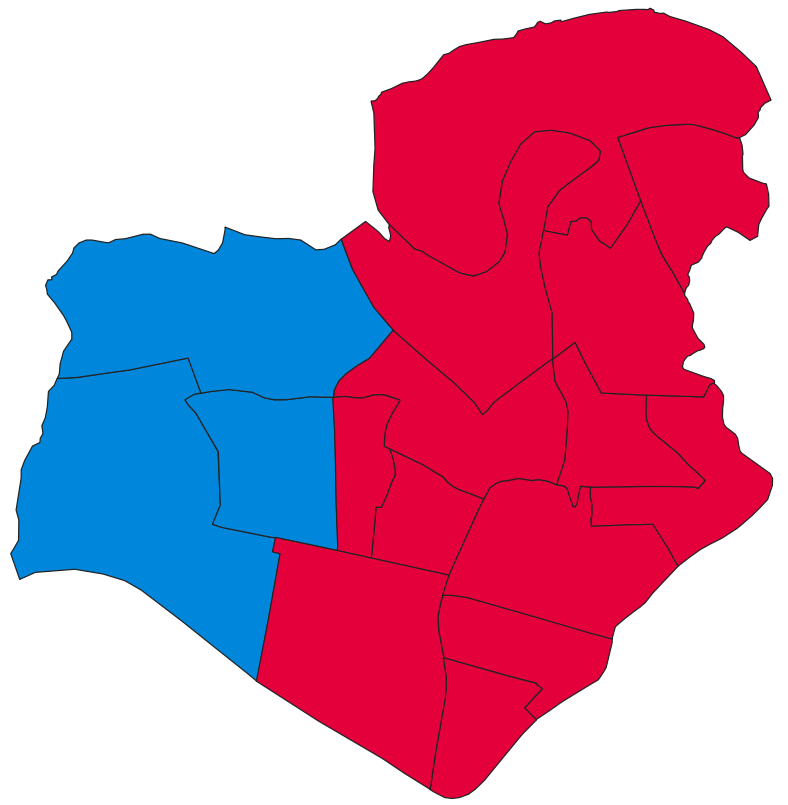
- Map of results of 1953 election
Leader of the Council before election
Labour
Leader of the Council after election
Labour

Elections to Salford City Council were held on Thursday, 7 May 1953. One-third of the councillors seats were up for election, with each successful candidate to serve a three-year term of office. The Labour Party retained overall control of the council.

== Election result ==
Party	Votes		Seats			Full Council	
Labour Party	31,578 (54.3%)	▼4.8	13 (81.3%)	13 / 16	▲3	52 (81.3%)	52 / 64
Conservative Party	25,035 (43.1%)	▲6.1	3 (18.7%)	3 / 16	▼3	12 (18.7%)	12 / 64
Liberal Party	1,402 (2.4%)	▼1.3	0 (0.0%)	0 / 16	Steady	0 (0.0%)	0 / 64
Communist	104 (0.2%)	Steady	0 (0.0%)	0 / 16	Steady	0 (0.0%)	0 / 64

=== Full council ===
↓
52	12

=== Aldermen ===
↓
16

=== Councillors ===
↓
36	12

== Ward results ==
=== Albert Park ===
Albert Park
Party	Candidate	Votes	%	±%
Labour	H. Durnford	2,535	52.5	−10.2
Conservative	F. Cope	2,296	47.5	+10.2
Majority		239	5.0	−20.4
Turnout		4,831		
Labour gain from Conservative		Swing		

=== Charlestown ===
Charlestown
Party	Candidate	Votes	%	±%
Labour	J. Hardman*	2,108	57.8	−5.2
Conservative	R. Ranicar	1,435	39.3	+5.6
Communist	E. Grundy	104	2.9	−0.4
Majority		673	18.5	−10.8
Turnout		3,647		
Labour hold		Swing		

=== Claremont ===
Claremont
Party	Candidate	Votes	%	±%
Conservative	A. F. Carroll*	3,405	62.1	+12.8
Labour	R. Wiggins	2,076	37.9	+1.5
Majority		1,329	24.2	+11.3
Turnout		5,481		
Conservative hold		Swing		

=== Crescent ===
Crescent
Party	Candidate	Votes	%	±%
Labour	T. W. Thelwell	1,530	58.2	−5.4
Conservative	N. J. Hockenhull	1,100	41.8	+5.4
Majority		430	16.4	−10.8
Turnout		2,630		
Labour hold		Swing		

=== Docks ===
Docks
Party	Candidate	Votes	%	±%
Labour	B. Burchill*	2,053	62.0	−4.6
Conservative	J. T. Callison	1,256	38.0	+4.6
Majority		797	24.0	−9.2
Turnout		3,309		
Labour hold		Swing		

=== Kersal ===
Kersal
Party	Candidate	Votes	%	±%
Labour	S. C. Hamburger*	2,683	53.6	−1.5
Conservative	H. Cobden Turner*	2,322	46.4	+1.5
Majority		361	7.2	−3.0
Turnout		5,005		
Labour gain from Conservative		Swing		

=== Langworthy ===
Langworthy
Party	Candidate	Votes	%	±%
Labour	F. M. Marron*	1,804	52.5	−7.8
Conservative	E. Phillips	1,025	29.8	−2.6
Liberal	K. Wolstenholme	606	17.7	+10.4
Majority		779	22.7	−5.2
Turnout		3,435		
Labour hold		Swing		

=== Mandley Park ===
Mandley Park
Party	Candidate	Votes	%	±%
Labour	E. M. Cooper*	2,690	60.0	+2.1
Conservative	R. H. Benham	1,792	40.0	−2.1
Majority		898	20.0	+4.2
Turnout		4,482		
Labour hold		Swing		

=== Ordsall Park ===
Ordsall Park
Party	Candidate	Votes	%	±%
Labour	B. Moylan*	2,008	67.5	−6.8
Conservative	W. Jones	965	32.5	+6.8
Majority		1,043	35.0	−13.6
Turnout		2,973		
Labour hold		Swing		

=== Regent ===
Regent
Party	Candidate	Votes	%	±%
Labour	L. Moreton*	2,009	65.5	−5.1
Conservative	J. Shaw	1,058	34.5	+5.1
Majority		951	31.0	−10.2
Turnout		3,067		
Labour hold		Swing		

=== St. Matthias' ===
St. Matthias'
Party	Candidate	Votes	%	±%
Labour	C. Bramall*	1,659	59.9	−3.4
Conservative	W. H. Povah	1,109	40.1	N/A
Majority		550	19.8	−6.8
Turnout		2,768		
Labour hold		Swing		

=== St. Paul's ===
St. Paul's
Party	Candidate	Votes	%	±%
Labour	T. A. Barton*	1,775	57.2	−9.7
Conservative	H. Hines	1,049	33.8	+7.0
Liberal	E. I. Rifkin	278	9.0	N/A
Majority		726	23.4	−10.4
Turnout		3,102		
Labour hold		Swing		

=== St. Thomas' ===
St. Thomas'
Party	Candidate	Votes	%	±%
Labour	N. Wright*	1,553	64.5	−4.0
Conservative	W. Parkin	855	35.5	+4.0
Majority		698	29.0	−8.0
Turnout		2,408		
Labour hold		Swing		

=== Seedley ===
Seedley
Party	Candidate	Votes	%	±%
Conservative	W. E. Hargreaves	1,754	46.4	−0.6
Labour	J. Hill	1,507	39.9	−13.1
Liberal	A. H. Hill	518	13.7	N/A
Majority		247	6.5	
Turnout		3,779		
Conservative hold		Swing		

=== Trinity ===
Trinity
Party	Candidate	Votes	%	±%
Labour	E. Barton	1,186	53.3	−4.6
Conservative	M. E. Butler*	1,038	46.7	+4.6
Majority		148	6.6	−9.2
Turnout		2,224		
Labour gain from Conservative		Swing		

=== Weaste ===
Weaste
Party	Candidate	Votes	%	±%
Conservative	A. G. Wild*	2,576	51.7	+2.4
Labour	E. L. Hardcastle	2,402	48.3	−2.4
Majority		174	3.4	
Turnout		4,978		
Conservative hold		Swing		
