= Some People Are on the Pitch They Think It's All Over It Is Now =

Studio album by the Dentists
- Released: 1985
- Genres: Jangle pop, power pop, post-punk, neo-psychedelia
- Label: Spruck

Some People Are on the Pitch They Think It's All Over It Is Now is the debut studio album by English rock band the Dentists, released in 1985 by the record label Spruck. The title is a reference to the famous BBC TV commentary made by Kenneth Wolstenholme during the closing moments of the 1966 FIFA World Cup Final.

The album's sound is influenced by the alternative rock of the time, while also being strongly reminiscent of experimental pop music of the 1960s, by the likes of Joe Meek and others. Recording took place from 30 November 1984 to 2 April 1985. The song "Strawberries Are Growing in My Garden (And It's Wintertime)" was also released as a single; years later it was still the group's best-known song.

== Reception ==
Professional ratings
Review scores
| Source | Rating |
|---|---|
| AllMusic | 4.5/5 stars |
| Tom Hull | B+ |

Critic Tim Sendra of AllMusic called it "a lost guitar pop classic". He specifically praised the mix of musical styles on the release, stating that the Dentists sounded "like the Byrds if they had formed in the wake of the punk explosion of the '70s". The single "Strawberries Are Growing in My Garden (And It's Wintertime)" received acclaim from critic Stuart Mason, also from Allmusic, who labelled the track a "neo-freakbeat masterpiece".

== Track listing ==
=== Side one ===
1. "Flowers Around Me"
2. "I'm Not the Devil"
3. "Tony Bastable vs. John Noakes"
4. "You Make Me Say It Somehow"
5. "Mary Won't Come Out to Play"
6. "I Had an Excellent Dream"

=== Side two ===
1. "Kinder Still"
2. "The Little Engineers Set"
3. "Back to the Grave"
4. "Tangerine"
5. "The Arrow Points to the Spot"
6. "Everything in the Garden"
7. "One of Our Psychedelic Beakers Are Missing"

== See also ==
- Neo-psychedelia
- "They think it's all over"
