= Pitch invasion =

Spectators running onto a sports pitch

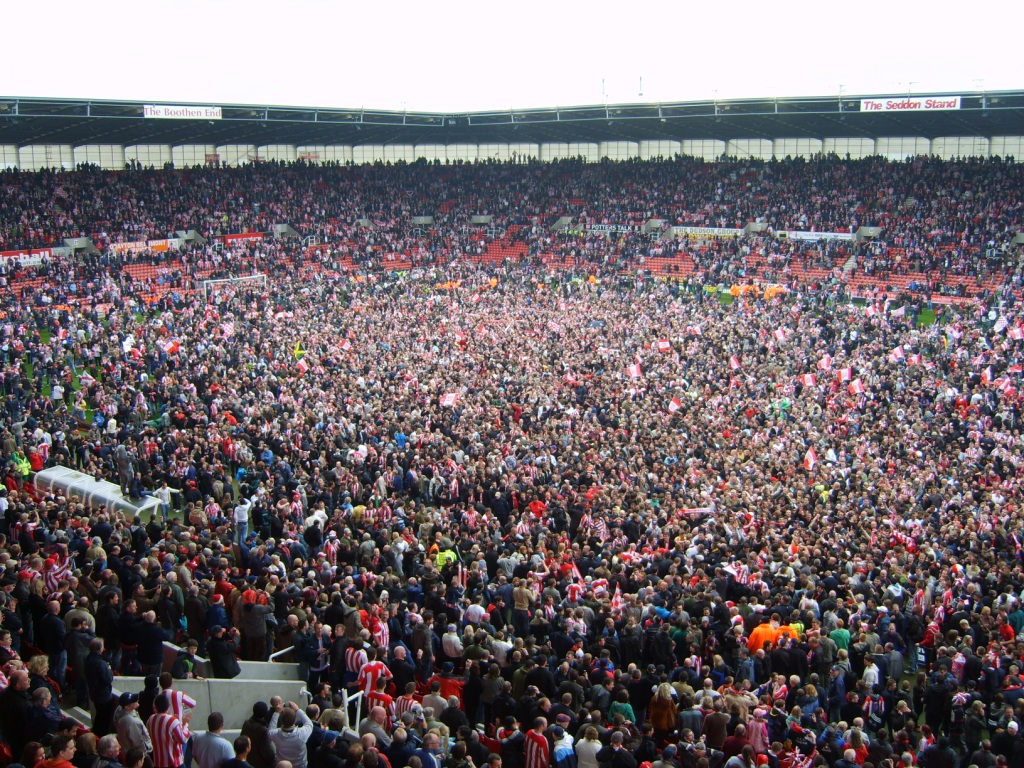
Stoke City fans invade the pitch post-match to celebrate promotion to the Premier League in 2008.

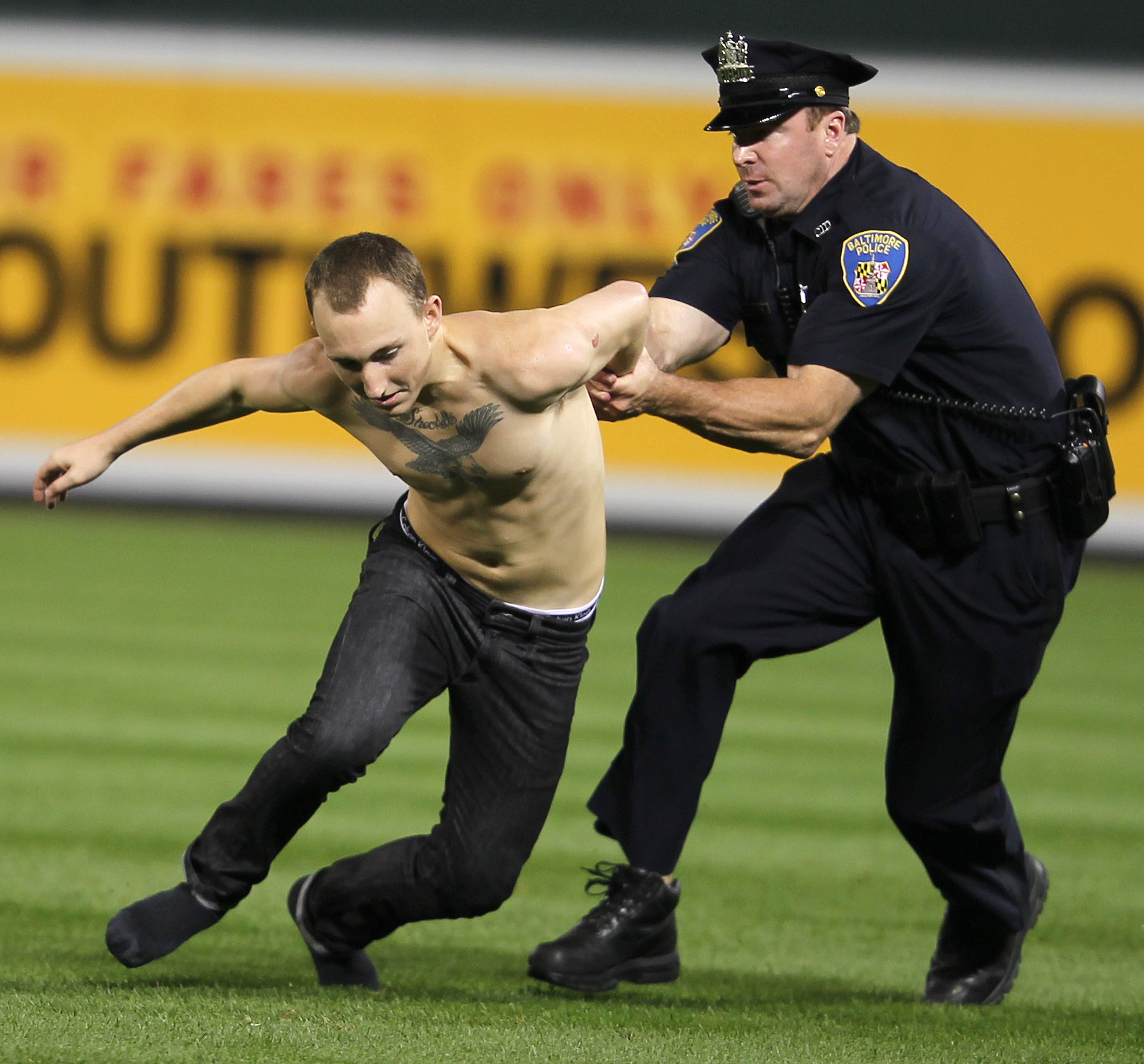
A police officer tackles a lone field invader at a 2011 Baltimore Orioles game.

A pitch invasion, also known as field storming, rushing the field, rushing the court, or storming the court, occurs when a person or a crowd of people spectating a sporting event run onto the competition area, usually to celebrate or protest an incident, or sometimes as a publicity stunt. Consequences for participants can result in criminal charges, fines or prison time, and sanctions against the club involved, especially if they cause a disruption in play, although they may sometimes be more welcomed if a large portion of the spectators invades the pitch simultaneously outside of playing time.

== American football ==
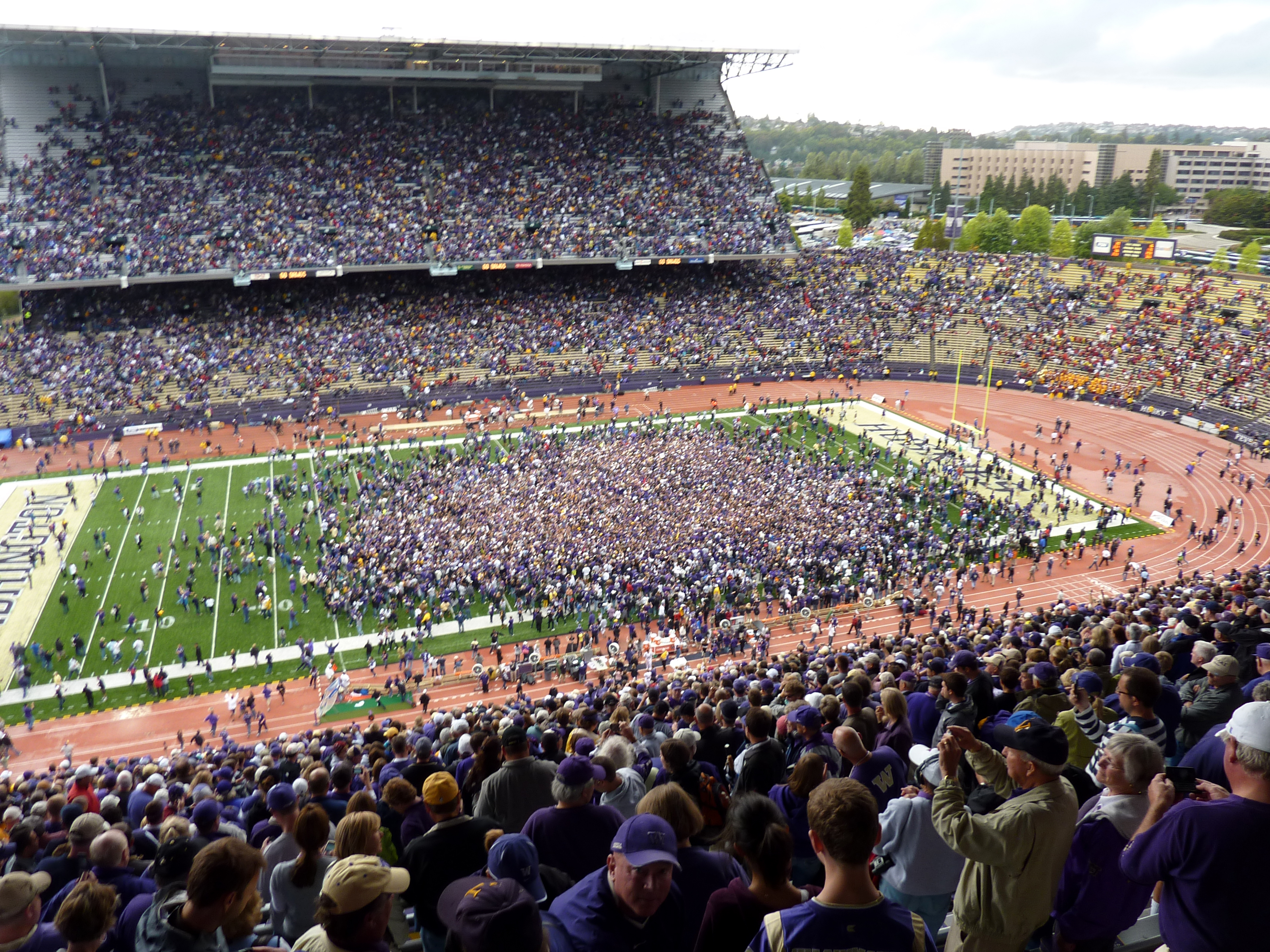
Washington Huskies college football fans storm the field in celebration after defeating the heavily favored No. 3 USC Trojans in an upset.

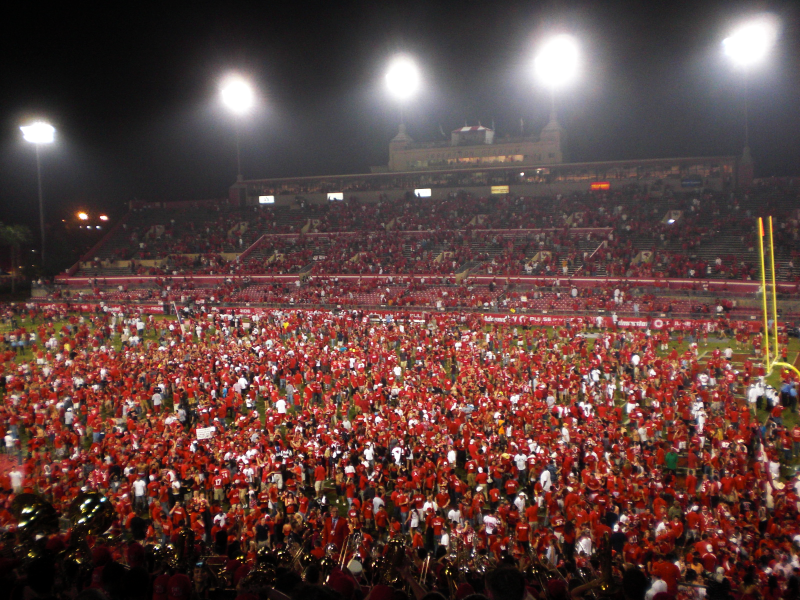
Houston Cougars football fans rushing the field after defeating rival Texas Tech in 2009

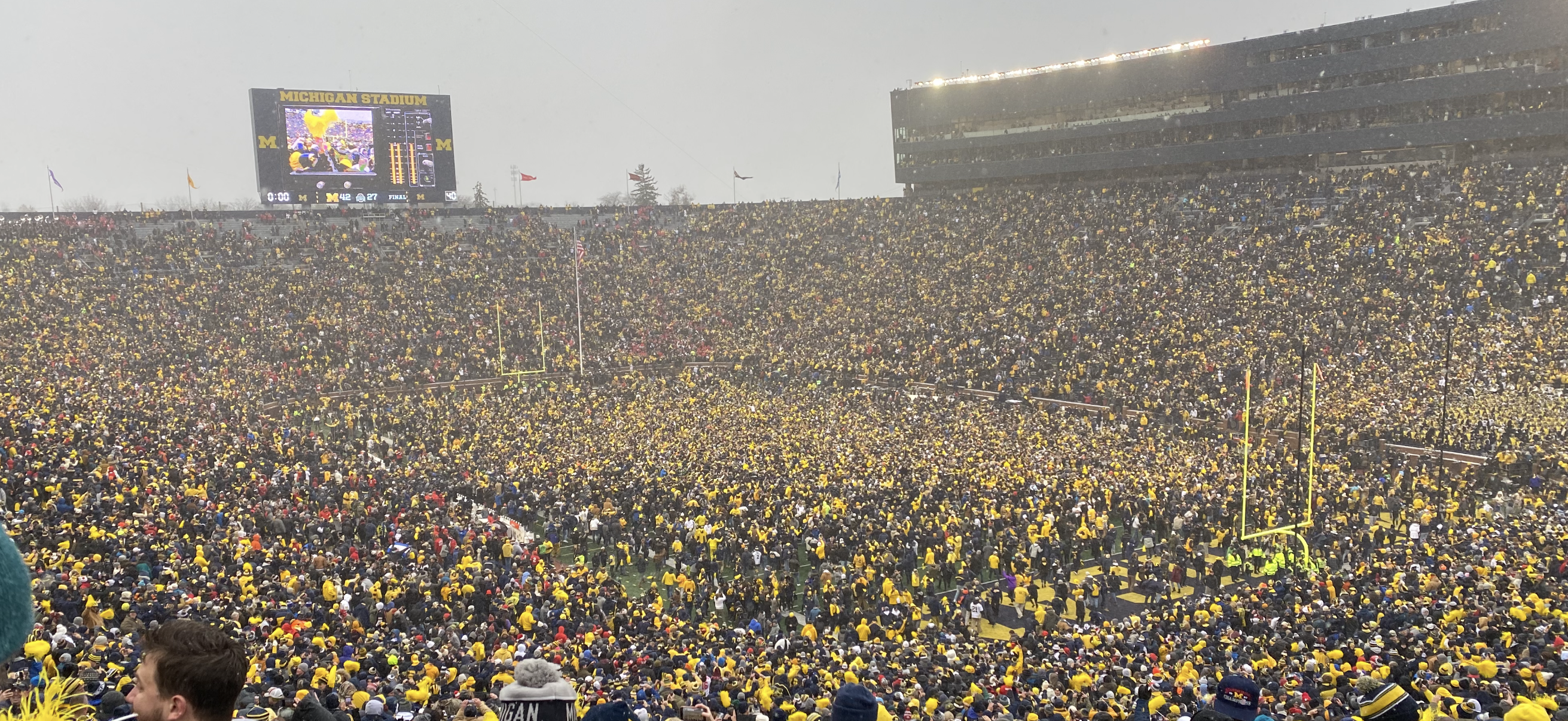
Michigan Wolverine football fans storming the field in the snow after defeating rival Ohio State in 2021

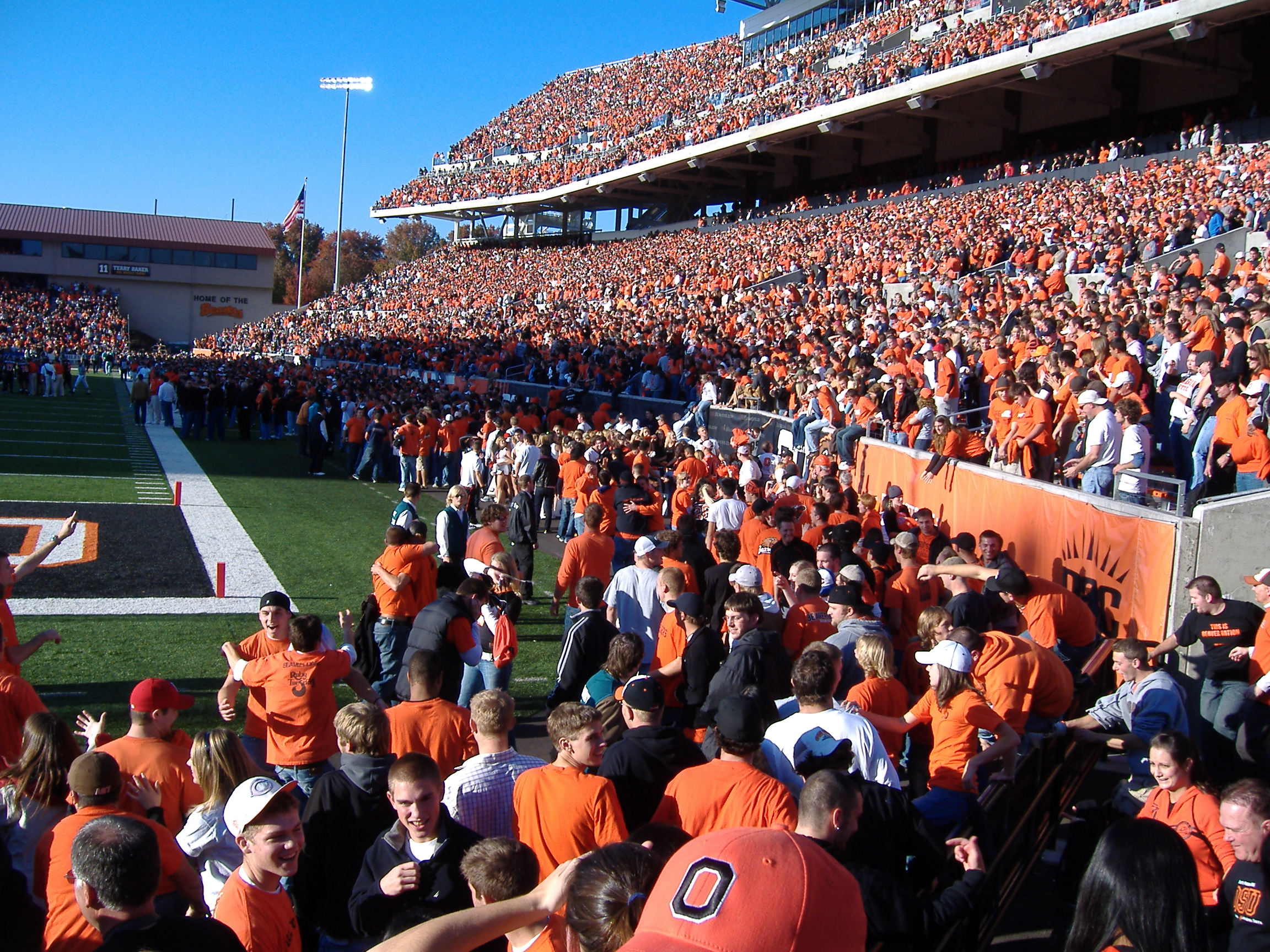
Oregon State football fans prepare to rush the field in a historic upset of No. 3 USC in 2006

A pitch invasion is common in college and high school football when a team pulls off a major upset, defeats a major rival, ends a long losing streak, or notches a history-making win. With the widespread advent of artificial turf, some schools have become more lenient about students storming the field. Goalposts are also taken down within moments of the end of the game as a cautionary measure to prevent fans from climbing atop them to cause damage to the standard holding them up, damage to television camera equipment on the posts, and spectator injury. In the National Football League, rushing the field usually results in a lifetime revocation of season tickets, even if given or sold to another person, along with a lifetime trespassing notice banning the rusher from the team and/or stadium property, or in cases of multiple rushes, other league stadiums.

=== Incidents ===
- Chicago College All-Star Game (23 July 1976): with 1:22 remaining in the third quarter, the Pittsburgh Steelers led the College All-Stars 24–0 when a torrential rainstorm hit the field which made play impossible. After officials called for a delay, drunk and unruly fans invaded the field and tore down the goalposts. Officials, security, and police attempted to clear the field, but twelve minutes later, NFL Commissioner Pete Rozelle and the sponsoring Chicago Tribune announced that the game had been called, which was greeted with jeers, and numerous brawls broke out on the flooded field before order was finally restored.
- Muscatine High School (8 September 1978): a high school football example, where fans celebrated the end of a long losing streak, as the Muskies had lost 44 consecutive games from 1973 to 1977, including 40 straight league games in the Mississippi Valley Conference. Optimism was high that the Muskies, now members of the newly formed Mississippi Eight Conference, would end their five-year-long losing streak sometime during the 1978 season, but it was in the season opener on the road against Ottumwa that Muscatine won their first game since the 1973 season opener. A touchdown with just over a minute left and a two-point conversion put Muscatine ahead with a 15–12 lead. Ottumwa advanced the ball to the Muskie 33-yard line on the ensuing series, but was intercepted in the Muskie end zone with two seconds left. As soon as time expired, more than 1,000 Muskie fans rushed the field to celebrate its first win in 45 contests; an attempt to tear down the goalposts was not successful.
- Buffalo Bills v Miami Dolphins (7 September 1980, NFL): the Bills broke a 20-game losing streak against their division rival, the Dolphins, on this day, prompting the 79,000 fans in attendance at Rich Stadium to storm the field and tear down the stadium's goalposts.
- California v Stanford (20 November 1982, Pacific-10 football): in the final seconds of the 1982 Big Game against the University of California, Berkeley (Cal), Stanford Band members and Stanford players ran out onto the field, thinking the game was over. Cal players lateralled the kickoff back and forth, with Cal's Kevin Moen dodging through the band for a winning touchdown, which he ended by running over trombone player Gary Tyrrell in the end zone. "The Play" is celebrated by Cal fans and inspires the ire of many Stanford fans. To this day, it remains one of the most famous plays in American football history. (The game does not end until the last play ends, even if the game clock runs out of time while the last play is still in progress. A penalty was called as a result of "The Play", but it was only because the spectators and band members had crowded onto the field while the game was in progress.)
- Philadelphia Stars v Michigan Panthers (17 July 1983, USFL football) USFL Championship Game: after dropping four out of five games to start their first season in the new league, Michigan acquired some NFL veterans to finish the year 12-6 and vaulted over the Oakland Invaders in the single-tier playoffs. In front of a crowd of 46,565 paid attendees at Mile High Stadium in Denver, the Panthers' late drive for a touchdown moved victory out of reach for the Stars, beating them 24–22. Despite the neutral ground afforded by a Super Bowl-style championship where the venue is selected in advance of the playoffs, several hundred Michigan fans stormed the field and congregated in the area of the south stands and south goalpost. Fans briefly mounted the goalpost, nearly breaking it down, and missiles, notably bottles, were hurled by fans at Denver Police, who responded with K-9 enforcement, mace and batons. In the melee, 12 fans were arrested by police, half from Michigan.
- Kentucky v LSU (9 November 2002, SEC football): Kentucky looked as if they would pull off a home upset of the Tigers when they held a 30–27 lead with two seconds left and LSU with the ball at their own 26-yard line. As quarterback Marcus Randall heaved a Hail Mary pass downfield, fans rushed onto the edges of the field ready to celebrate Kentucky's victory; however, the pass was deflected off two Wildcat defenders and into the hands of LSU wide receiver Devery Henderson, who was able to run into the end zone to cap a 33–30 win for LSU and leaving the fans on the field stunned at the turn of events. The play would come to be known as the Bluegrass Miracle. Five years later, at the same stadium, Wildcats fans invaded the field after avenging the loss with a thrilling triple-overtime win, and the school was fined $50,000 for a third violation of the conference's policy prohibiting field storming (see below).
- Texas Tech v Texas (2 November 2008): Texas Tech fans invaded the Jones AT&T Stadium turf three times during the final moments of the game. The first happened after Michael Crabtree caught a touchdown pass from Graham Harrell with one second to go: overjoyed fans, thinking the game was over and the Red Raiders had upset No. 1-ranked Texas, spilt out onto the field, doing so again after the replay official announced that Crabtree had indeed stayed inbounds the moment before crossing the goal line. Tech was assessed two unsportsmanlike conduct penalties for this, forcing them to kick off from the 7-and-a-half yard line. After the ball was recovered by Tech, the game ended and the fans stormed the field one final time without penalty.
- Auburn v Alabama (30 November 2013): Auburn University faced off against their arch-rivals, the University of Alabama in their annual rivalry game, popularly known as the Iron Bowl. Alabama entered the season ranked No. 1 after winning two consecutive BCS National Championships. Auburn had begun the season unranked but had moved up to No. 4 in the rankings, marking the second time both teams were ranked in the Top 5 of the BCS rankings. The winner of the game would earn the right to play in the SEC Championship Game. With one second left on the clock and the score tied, Alabama elected to attempt a 57-yard field goal. The kick was short and Auburn defender Chris Davis fielded it from nine yards deep in his own end zone. He returned the kick all the way to the Alabama end zone, scoring the game-winning touchdown, in a play known as the Kick Six. In spite of the SEC's penalties for rushing the field, thousands of Auburn fans (mainly students) flooded the field in delight at earning a spot in the SEC Championship game, as well as ending arch-rival Alabama's national title hopes. Following the game, the Auburn grounds crew discovered that among the debris left on the field was a pile of cremains on the Auburn sideline, assumed to be placed there by a fan honoring a deceased relation's request to have his ashes scattered on the field. (Traditionally, sports teams rarely permit "burials" on their fields in order to protect the health of the turf: if so, it is almost always an important club figure whose remains are scattered, or are properly buried and interred below the turf during a maintenance period.)
- Florida State v Virginia (26 September 2025): Virginia fans raided the Scott Stadium field after the Cavaliers upset the eighth-ranked Seminoles in double overtime, 46–38.

=== Southeastern Conference penalties ===
Section 10.5 of the Southeastern Conference By-Laws has a progressive fine policy adopted in 2004 for major sports: $5,000 for the first offense, $25,000 for the second offense, and $50,000 for third and subsequent offenses within a three-year period of the last field storming. In May 2015, the fines increased to $50,000; $100,000; and $250,000 for the first, second, and third plus subsequent offenses, respectively, with a period for past violations being increased from three years to five. In 2023, the fines were respectively further increased to $100,000; $250,000; and $500,000 and changed so the fine would be paid to the opposing institution for conference games (nonconference games continued to have the fine paid to the SEC's scholarship fund), with each team also being given a clean slate. Since 2025, SEC schools are fined $500,000 for every field- or court-storming offense.

For an upset situation, the fine (which in college sports is usually a donation to a conference's scholarship fund rather than a punitive payment, as is the course for the SEC) is generally taken as a "badge of honor" by the school and its fanbase that knows the cost of storming well in advance, and fans and the school's booster club proudly donate the funds to a school's athletic department needed to pay the fine, along with the secondary cost for the replacement of damaged or removed goalposts. The Kentucky Wildcats were hit with "the triple" for three football field stormings within eleven months, involving upset wins against league powers and an in-state rival:

- On 4 November 2006, the team was fined $5,000 for a field invasion after a football win against Georgia.
- On 15 September 2007, the team was fined $25,000 for a storming after a football non-conference win against archrival Louisville.
- On 13 October 2007, the team was fined $50,000 for a field rush after a triple-overtime football win against top-ranked LSU.

Vanderbilt, South Carolina, and Missouri had been fined $25,000 for second offense violations, but most SEC schools were fined $5,000. Alabama has never been fined, considering itself far too classy an institution to partake in field-storming. Missouri's fine is notable in that their second violation occurred after only three years as a member of the SEC: both came when supporters flooded Faurot Field after the team clinched a trip to the SEC Championship Game, in 2013 and 2014. LSU was fined $100,000 for a second offence following its victory 13 October 2018, against Georgia. Its first offence was 25 October 2014, following a victory over Ole Miss, drawing just a $5,000 fine. LSU fans twice tore down the goalposts in 2000, following victories over Tennessee and Alabama, but did not invade the Tiger Stadium field again until 2014. The goalposts remained intact during the 2014 and 2018 incidents. Auburn became the first SEC institution to be fined the maximum of $250,000, following its football victory over Alabama on 25 November 2017. This came on top of violations following Auburn victories over Alabama in football in 2013 and Kentucky in men's basketball in 2016. Auburn was fined another $250,000 after fans stormed the field following its Iron Bowl victory on 30 November 2019.

Arkansas was fined $250,000 when its fans stormed the field after a victory over Texas on 11 September 2021. Two weeks later, Kentucky was hit with a $250,000 fine following a victory over Florida, the Wildcats' first home win over the Gators since 1986. In 2022, LSU was hit with two $250,000 fines following successive home wins over Ole Miss and Alabama. The goalposts remained standing following both incidents. Missouri became the first institution to be fined $100,000 for a first offense following a last-second upset win over No. 15 Kansas State after the game ended on an SEC record 61-yard successful field goal. Ole Miss became the second two weeks later when it defeated LSU. The Rebels were fined an additional $75,000 for fans throwing debris onto the field at various times during the game. On October 5, 2024, both Arkansas and Vanderbilt scored upset victories over then-No. 4 Tennessee and then-No. 1 Alabama, respectively, resulting in field invasions. This marked the first instance that two top 5 SEC teams lost to unranked conference opponents in the same day. The schools were fined $250,000 and $100,000, respectively.

LSU was assessed a $250,000 fine when fans rushed the field after another victory against Ole Miss on October 12, 2024. Texas and LSU were each fined $250,000 by the SEC in 2024 for fans throwing debris onto the field during losses by their respective football teams, the Longhorns vs. Georgia (October 19) and the Tigers vs. Alabama (November 9). The SEC also mandated both universities identify offenders and ban them from all athletic events for the remainder of the 2024–25 school year. Ole Miss was fined $350,000 after its November 9, 2024 win vs. Georgia for another field invasion—$250,000 for a second offense and an extra $100,000 for fans entering the playing field before the end of the game.

Oklahoma was assessed its first fine of $100,000 as an SEC member when fans stormed the Gaylord Family Oklahoma Memorial Stadium gridiron after the Sooners' win over Alabama on 23 November 2024. Like Ole Miss two weeks prior, Oklahoma was fined an additional $100,000 because its fans came on the field before the game ended. Missouri was fined $250,000 when fans rushed the court at Mizzou Arena after the men's basketball team defeated archrival Kansas on 8 December 2024. (Creighton fans rushed the court at CHI Health Center Omaha four days earlier when the Bluejays defeated the Jayhawks, but the Big East Conference does not fine schools for court invasions.) Vanderbilt became the first SEC institution to be fined $500,000 for a third pitch invasion following its men's basketball win over Kentucky on 25 January 2025. This came one week following the Commodores' men's basketball upset victory over in-state rival Tennessee that drew a $250,000 second pitch invasion fine. Mississippi State was also fined $500,000 for a field storming after its upset win over Arizona State on 6 September 2025.

=== Atlantic Coast Conference penalties ===
Beginning with the 2025–26 academic year, the Atlantic Coast Conference (ACC) issued a new event security policy that discourages fans from storming the field or court until the visiting team and game officials have safely exited the playing area. Member schools are fined $50,000 for the first offense, $100,000 for the second offense, and $200,000 for the third and subsequent offenses over a two-year period from the field storming, with the fines being directed to the conference's postgraduate scholarship fund. On 30 August 2025, Florida State upset Alabama at Doak Campbell Stadium, 31–17. The school was fined $50,000 for the subsequent field invasion by Seminoles fans. This is the first ACC fine for a field storming.

=== Other conference penalties ===
Other conferences have similar bylaws; in some conferences, the rule is reset to zero after five years without a field storming, and the fine is doubled in the event that a player or official is injured as a result of the invasion; however, some conferences have begun cracking down on stormings in all sports.

=== Tearing down the goalposts ===
There has long been a tradition in American football – primarily in college football – under which fans celebrating a major victory will tear down the goalposts on the field after the game. No one knows for certain when or how the tradition started. The Boston Public Library has in its collection a photograph of fans tearing down a goal post in 1940. Tearing down the goalposts can be dangerous, as people can be injured or killed by a falling goal post. Persons who sit or hang on the goalposts while they are being pulled down can be injured if they fall off or if they land hard on the ground when the goalposts collapse. Camera equipment from a game broadcaster attached to the goalposts results in another injury possibility. These dangers can create legal implications for the schools, the localities, and the venues where the games occur.

In Massachusetts, there is a state statute that specifically prohibits the unauthorized tearing down of goalposts on a football field. Chapter 266, Section 104A of the Massachusetts General Laws provides: "Whoever willfully and without right destroys, injures or removes a goal post on a football field shall be punished by a fine of not less than fifty nor more than two hundred dollars." The Massachusetts state legislature enacted the statute in 1960 in response to a tragedy that occurred the previous year. On 26 November 1959 (Thanksgiving Day that year), a 14-year-old girl in Foxborough, Jane Puffer, was hit on the head by a falling goal post. She had been part of a crowd that was on the field after the conclusion of a high school football game while a group of fans was tearing down a goal post. The steel goal post suddenly toppled to the ground, and Puffer was hit as she was apparently trying to push another girl out of its way. She died of her injuries the next day. The state legislature enacted the statute the following year, and the law has remained unchanged ever since.

In spite of the law, on 22 December 1985, fans of the New England Patriots tore down a goal post in Sullivan Stadium (also in Foxborough) to celebrate the team's victory there in the regular season finale against the Cincinnati Bengals, which clinched a playoff berth (and eventual Super Bowl appearance) for the Patriots. Some fans carried the goal post outside of the stadium, where they caused it to come into contact with an overhead high-voltage power line. A man nearby, Jon Pallazola, was seriously injured. There was evidence that he was injured when he tried to protect himself from being hit by the falling goal post immediately after it became electrified. Pallazola subsequently sued a private security company that had been under contract to provide security at the stadium. He received a large jury verdict against the company, and then settled his claim against the company for $4.5 million. He also sued the Town of Foxborough but, in 1994, the Massachusetts Supreme Judicial Court ruled that his claim against the town was barred by a state statute that gave municipalities immunity from claims that they failed to provide police protection or prevent crimes.

On 19 November 1983, an 18-year-old Harvard University student was critically injured when she was hit on the back of her head by a goal post that Harvard fans tore down to celebrate their team's victory over archrival Yale University at the Yale Bowl in New Haven, Connecticut. The student, Margaret Cimino, subsequently filed a lawsuit in federal court against Yale, the City of New Haven, the City of West Haven, and a security company. She settled her claims against the City of West Haven and the security company. In 1986, a federal judge ruled that Cimino had sufficient evidence to take her claims against Yale and the City of New Haven to trial. The parties then reached a settlement before the trial occurred.

On 21 November 1998, a first-year student at Oregon State University was seriously injured when she was hit on the head by a falling goal post that fans tore down after the football team's 44-41 double overtime victory over the University of Oregon. She suffered a fractured skull and bleeding in her brain, but she eventually recovered from her injuries. In November 2000, fans of the University of Texas at El Paso tore down a goal post after a victory. One fan claimed that he was injured when fans pulled the goalposts down while he was hanging on them. He sued the university and the University System of Texas. A Texas intermediate appellate court ruled in 2005 that the lawsuit was barred by governmental immunity.

On 20 October 2001, a 21-year-old Ball State University student was rendered paraplegic when a goal post that fellow fans tore down to celebrate a victory landed on his back. The university had encouraged the fans to tear down the goal post, flashing a message on the scoreboard which said, "The goal post looks lonely." The student, Andrew Bourne, settled his subsequent claim against the university for $300,000, the maximum amount that he could recover from the school under Indiana state law. He also filed a product liability lawsuit against the manufacturer of the goal post, contending that the goal post was "defective and unreasonably dangerous". In 2006, a federal appeals court ruled that the manufacturer was not liable because the danger posed by the goal post was "obvious".

In order to prevent injuries, there are collapsible goalposts that stadium staff can take down within seconds after the conclusion of a game to prevent fans from tearing them down. There are also goalposts that are constructed in such a manner that they cannot be taken down by fans. On 4 October 2014, Ole Miss fans stormed the field and tore down the goalposts after knocking off No. 1 Alabama 23–17. On 2 November 2015, students at the University of Kansas illegally broke into Memorial Stadium and tore down the goalpost at the south end of the field following the Kansas City Royals' World Series clinching victory vs. the New York Mets at Citi Field. The goalposts at the stadium were also torn down after victories by the Jayhawks, vs. Nebraska in 2005 and 2007, West Virginia in 2013, Iowa State in 2014, Texas in 2016, Oklahoma State in 2022, Oklahoma in 2023, and in 1994 by fans of archrival Kansas State.

On 15 October 2022, Tennessee fans stormed the field and tore down the goalposts after knocking off No. 3 Alabama 52–49 on a game-winning field goal and ending a 15-game losing streak to the Crimson Tide. One was later tossed into the Tennessee River. On 5 October 2024, Vanderbilt fans rushed the field and tore down one of the goalposts after defeating No. 1 Alabama 40–35. It was the Commodores' first win over a top five opponent in program history as well as their first ever win over a No. 1 ranked opponent in program history, having previously gone 0–60. The fans later tossed the goalpost into the Cumberland River. On 12 September 2026, Oklahoma State fans rushed the field after defeating No. 6 Oregon 39-31, coming in as a 23.5 point underdog and being on a 21 game loss streak against FBS opponents. Fans tore down the goalpost and would toss it into the Theta Pond.

== Association football ==
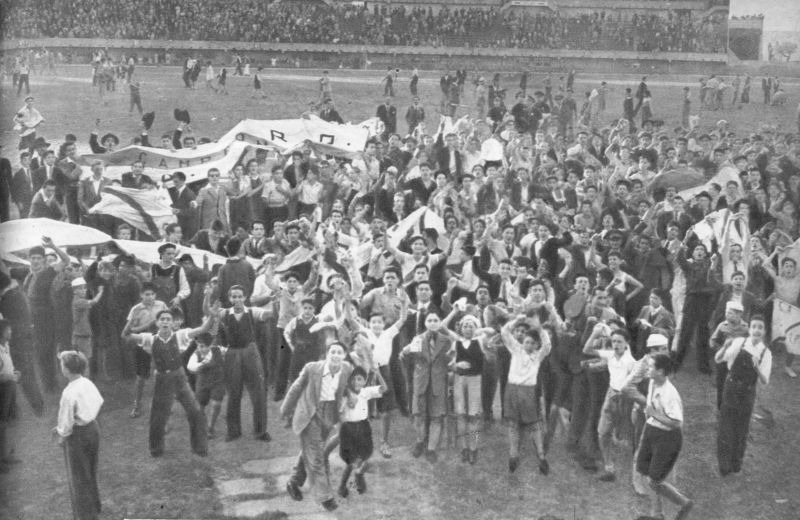
River Plate supporters invade the field during the 1945 league title.

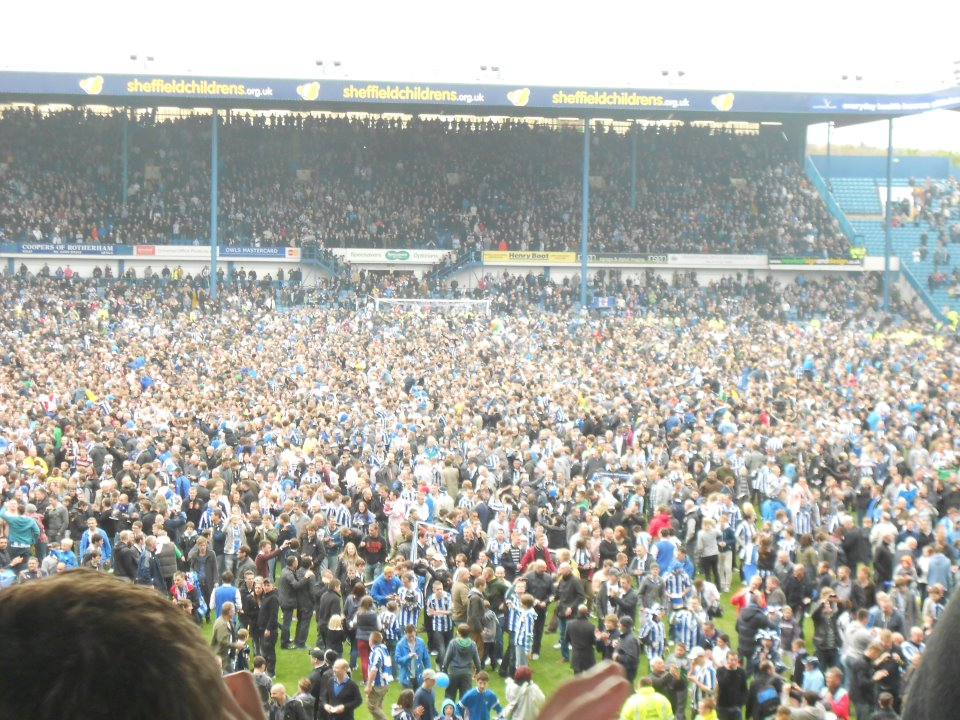
Sheffield Wednesday fans invade the pitch to celebrate promotion to the Championship on 5 May 2012.

Pitch invasions are not uncommon but not as frequent nowadays in top-level football, but historically it was common for the supporters of the winning team in a major match, such as a Cup Final, to flood onto the pitch after the final whistle. For example, in Kenneth Wolstenholme's famous "Some people are on the pitch, they think it's all over—it is now!" comment on the BBC's television coverage of the 1966 World Cup Final. "They" were fans who had encroached onto the pitch before the end of extra time. Counterintuitively, despite the fact that the 1970s and 1980s were a time where fans were barricaded in the stands by the use of fences, pitch invasions were not uncommon; when the barricading form of crowd control was abandoned after the 1989 Hillsborough disaster, pitch invasions became rarer.

Several reasons may account for the decline in pitch invasions. After the Hillsborough disaster, terraces were required to be converted into all-seater stands, from which it is somewhat more difficult for spectators to physically rush down in order to reach the pitch—especially in large numbers, and from higher rows of seats. Moreover, pitch invasions were criminalised in 1991 in the UK under the Football Offences Act. There is also the concurrent and substantial increase in the cost of tickets, especially for seating in the lower rows, leading to these seats increasingly being occupied by wealthier fans who are much less inclined to risk legal, professional or other consequences which could arise from invading the pitch. Pitch invasions still do occur, especially in the lower divisions, where terraces are still permitted, tickets are much less expensive, and there is less policing and security.

=== Notable pitch invasions ===
- Celtic v Rangers (17 April 1909) Scottish Cup final replay. At the end of the drawn replay, the crowd invaded the pitch to protest at the lack of a result and at the prospect of having to pay to watch a third game. The SFA withheld the Cup.
- Everton v Sheffield Wednesday (14 May 1966) FA Cup final. Sheffield Wednesday had scored two goals while Everton had a goal disqualified as offside before Everton scored two goals in the second half to equalise. Shortly after the equalising goal Everton fan Eddie Canavagh invaded the pitch, eluding one police officer before being tackled and escorted off the pitch by a second officer. Everton went on to win the game 3–2.
- Celtic v Inter Milan (25 May 1967) European Cup final. As the final whistle blew, fans of Celtic flooded the pitch in jubilation as Celtic became the first British team to lift the European Cup.
- Hereford United v Newcastle United (5 February 1972) FA Cup. Non-league Hereford beat top-flight Newcastle 2–1 after extra time. There were pitch invasions after both Hereford goals and one at the end of the match.
- Manchester United v Manchester City (27 April 1974) Football League First Division. There were pitch invasions a few minutes after Denis Law scored the only goal for the visiting team, in a match that would have given United hope of staying in the old First Division had they won as it was the second to last game of the season. Although United's fate was not sealed with that goal, the pitch invasion confirmed it as the match was abandoned 8 minutes before playing time had expired, along with negative results elsewhere.
- England v Scotland (4 June 1977) Home International. Scotland won 2–1 with goals from Gordon McQueen and Kenny Dalglish in the match played at the old Wembley. At the final whistle, Scotland supporters invaded the pitch and destroyed one of the goals. The scenes were broadcast live on UK TV, and this is identified as one of the key moments when football hooliganism caught the interest of politicians.
- Celtic v Rangers (10 May 1980) Scottish Cup final. Celtic beat Rangers 1–0 during extra time and rioting ensued on the pitch at full-time. Mounted police had to break up the battling fans; this also led to the banning of alcohol from Scottish football grounds.
- Derby County v Fulham (14 May 1983) Football League Second Division. This match was controversially never concluded after Derby fans invaded the pitch. Fulham required a win to be promoted back into the top flight of English football but despite their protests the match was never replayed and the result, a 1–0 defeat, stood.
- Everton v Wimbledon (7 May 1994). In an attempt to secure 40 consecutive years of top-flight football, Everton, who had been at the foot of the table for much of a dreadful season, needed to beat the in-form Wimbledon, who had not lost for 10 games in a row. The club's chairman had offered a trip to Las Vegas if they should make it 11. Despite one stand being closed due to construction the atmosphere was known as one of the greatest ever within Goodison Park. Although they went 2–0 down in the first 20 minutes, Everton managed a remarkable comeback to win the game 3–2 and secure survival. A mass pitch invasion ensued and many images of the emotional day were screened on the BBC's Grandstand.
- Carlisle United v Plymouth Argyle (8 May 1999). Having been bottom of the table for much of the season, Carlisle United needed a win to stand any chance of possible survival and retain their Football League status. With the score at 1–1 against Plymouth in injury time, on-loan goalkeeper Jimmy Glass came forward from his own half into the opposition box for the subsequent Carlisle corner kick. The ball met Glass on a rebound shot and he kicked into the net to score, winning the match and condemning Scarborough to relegation in the process. A mass pitch invasion took place before the match ended.
- Schalke v Unterhaching (19 May 2001). Before the last round of matches of the Bundesliga 2000–01 season, Bayern Munich led Schalke 04 by three points, but with an inferior goal difference. Schalke managed to defeat Unterhaching 5–3 in their final match at the Parkstadion. Shortly before this match ended, Bayern gave up a 90th-minute goal against Hamburg. Most Schalke supporters believed their team had won their first championship since 1958. The pitch had thus been stormed in celebration although the match in Hamburg was not concluded yet. In Hamburg, an indirect free kick was awarded for Bayern and Patrik Andersson eventually scored the decisive equaliser. In Schalke, the atmosphere immediately turned from joy and celebration to shock, disbelief and mourning.
- Aston Villa v Manchester United (6 January 2002) FA Cup. Manchester United were 2–0 down with 15 minutes left of play; however, Manchester United scored three times in 5 minutes and their third goal caused many Manchester United fans to invade the pitch in celebration.
- Watford v Luton Town (10 September 2002). 10 minutes before the Football League Cup game kicked off, Luton fans invaded the pitch, provoking the Watford fans to do the same. A mass brawl on the pitch ensued between the two sets and the game was delayed for 25 minutes before riot police regained order.
- Queens Park Rangers v Crewe Alexandra (26 April 2003) Football League Division 2. QPR needed to win this game to pip Crewe of automatic promotion from Division 2. During the game there was an infamous coin throwing incident, and a QPR fan went onto the pitch to remonstrate with the referee. The game finished 0–0, meaning Crewe were promoted, and hundreds of QPR fans invaded the pitch.
- West Bromwich Albion v Portsmouth (15 May 2005) FA Premier League. West Brom defeated Portsmouth 2–0; combined with other results, this completed one of the most amazing escapes from relegation in English football history. West Brom became the first team since the advent of the modern Premiership in 1992–93 to escape relegation after being bottom of the table at Christmas. Once all results came in and West Brom were secure, thousands of Baggies fans at The Hawthorns ecstatically ran onto the pitch. Many Portsmouth fans joined the celebrations, as one of the teams relegated instead of West Brom were their arch-rivals Southampton.
- Reading v Derby County (1 April 2006) Football League Championship. Reading defeated Derby County 5–0 to secure the Football League Championship title. In the previous game Reading drew 1–1 with Leicester City at the Walkers Stadium to secure promotion to the FA Premier League for their first season in the top flight during their 135-year history. At the end of the game Reading fans spilt onto the pitch to celebrate these two achievements.
- Wigan Athletic v Portsmouth (29 April 2006) FA Premier League. Portsmouth defeated Wigan 2–1 to ensure Portsmouth's survival in the FA Premier League. Nicknamed "the Great Escape" by Portsmouth fans, this win marked the conclusion to an astonishing series of matches under their manager Harry Redknapp who had rejoined the club earlier in the year, after being sacked by fierce rivals Southampton, when Portsmouth were in a deep relegation crisis. It heralded the arrival of Portsmouth's new owner, Sacha Gaydamak, who bankrolled the signings made by Harry Redknapp during the January transfer window. Portsmouth fans invaded the pitch at the DW Stadium in jubilation and relief at staying up. This marked the beginning of the saga leading to Portsmouth's relegation and bankruptcy.
- West Ham United v Millwall (25 August 2009) Football League Cup. After West Ham equalised, fans invaded the pitch but did not cause a major disturbance. After West Ham scored twice more, hundreds of their fans invaded the pitch and riot police were hastily deployed. It took over six minutes for the police to clear the pitch. Sports Minister Gerry Sutcliffe was quoted as saying that the violence between West Ham and Millwall was "a disgrace to football" and the invasions were widely condemned by the FA and the players.
- Sarajevo v Široki Brijeg (21 April 2010) Premier League of Bosnia and Herzegovina. Fans of Sarajevo invaded the pitch after the game ended with 1–1 to show their dissatisfaction over the result but also to protest because no one was still arrested for the killing of Vedran Puljić, a Sarajevo fan, on their away match in Široki Brijeg earlier in the session (4 October 2011).
- Željezničar v Laktaši (23 May 2010) Premier League of Bosnia and Herzegovina. Fans of Željezničar invaded the pitch after the final whistle to celebrate the return of the title to valley of cups after 8 years. During the whole match tifo were organized, like flares, big flags, transparents and card stunts. To celebrate the return of the title, but also to thank the Maniacs (ultras group of Željezničars fans) for their support, Željezničar organized a firework at the end.
- Bray Wanderers v Shamrock Rovers (29 October 2010) League of Ireland Premier Division. Shamrock Rovers won their first league title since 1994 and fans invaded the pitch in celebration.
- Southampton v Coventry City (28 April 2012) Football League Championship. Southampton fans invaded the pitch following back to back promotions to the Premiership following an absence of seven years in which the club entered administration.
- Manchester City v Queens Park Rangers (13 May 2012) Premier League. Manchester City fans invaded the pitch at the City of Manchester Stadium after winning the Premier League title in dramatic circumstances, coming back from 2–1 down against QPR in stoppage time. Many QPR fans joined the celebrations, as one of the teams relegated at QPR's expense was their relegation rival Bolton Wanderers. This was the first time the club had won a top-flight championship since 1968 and their first ever Premier League title.
- Fortuna Düsseldorf v Hertha (15 May 2012) Bundesliga relegation play-off. During extra time, Fortuna fans invaded the pitch at the Esprit Arena, causing a twenty-minute interruption. Police and security staff had to clear the pitch before the remaining 90 seconds could be played.
- Everton v AEK Athens (9 August 2012) Pre-Season Friendly. Everton icon Tony Hibbert, who had not scored a goal for Everton in 11 years at the club, had his testimonial at Goodison Park. Everton fans had come up with the slogan "If Hibbert scores, we riot", stating that if Hibbert ever scored a goal at Goodison Park, then they would riot on the pitch. In the second half of a pre-season friendly in 2012, Hibbert scored a free kick and many supporters ran on the pitch singing "Oh Tony Hibbert, he scores when he wants." After the match, Hibbert described his goal and the celebrations as "a fairytale".
- Melbourne Heart v Melbourne Victory (22 December 2012) A-League. Melbourne Victory fans invaded the pitch at AAMI Park after winning the Melbourne derby fixture 2–1 in dramatic circumstances against their bitter city arch-rivals Melbourne Heart thanks to Archie Thompson's match winning goal three minutes into stoppage time.
- Wigan Cosmos v AFC Leigh Centurions (17 March 2013) South Lancashire Counties League. About 300 Newcastle United fans invaded the pitch and caused the amateur game in Wigan to be abandoned before their own Premier League fixture against Wigan Athletic at the DW Stadium. During the 40 minute rampage, another South Lancashire Counties League game was disrupted and hundreds of pounds worth of damage was caused by Newcastle fans.
- Watford F.C. v Leicester City F.C. (12 May 2013). Watford fans invaded the pitch to celebrate defeating Leicester City 3–1 with a goal deep in stoppage time, as the win ensured Watford a place in the 2013 Football League Championship play-off final, which gave Watford the opportunity to return to the Premier League for the first time since 2007.
- Elfsborg v Malmö (28 October 2013) Allsvenskan. In the 29th round, Malmö secured the league title with a five-point lead after getting a 2–0 win in Borås. With 20 seconds left of the game, referee Jonas Eriksson awarded a free kick to Malmö – fans of the future champions who were celebrating behind the sidelines thought that Eriksson had blown the whistle for full-time, and stormed the pitch followed by police rushing in to protect the players. TV cameras showed Malmö player Guillermo Molins telling the fans to get off the pitch, and the players and fans then waited for the police to leave the pitch. Two minutes after the first pitch invasion, Jonas Eriksson restarted the game and blew for full-time only seconds later, again with fans invading the pitch in celebration and police keeping the fans on Malmö's half.
- Brazil national football team v South Africa national football team (5 March 2014) . A young South African boy entered the field after Brazil's 5–0 victory over Bafana Bafana and as security staff began to escort the boy from the field Brazilian star Neymar intervened and introduced the boy to his teammates before they lifted him into the air during their celebrations. This earned Neymar praise for his conduct.
- Reading v Burnley (3 May 2014) Football League Championship. A section of Reading fans invaded the pitch at the Madejski Stadium after drawing 2–2 with Burnley as they had believed they had clinched the last play-off position. Due to errors in communication, many had erroneously believed Brighton had failed to beat Nottingham Forest when in fact they had scored a late winner to secure 6th place ahead of Reading.
- Bristol Rovers v Mansfield Town (3 May 2014) Football League Two. Bristol Rovers needed a draw with Mansfield to avoid relegation to the Conference on the final day of the season, but after losing to a solitary strike by Colin Daniel, which, coupled with wins for Wycombe Wanderers and Northampton Town, ended the home side's 94-year-long tenure in the Football League, several Rovers fans flooded onto the pitch at the final whistle, chanting "Sack the board" and throwing abuse at the players and the away fans. Mounted police cleared the scene shortly afterwards, and 28 Rovers fans were charged for their involvement in the violence surrounding Bristol Rovers' relegation to the Non-League.
- Manchester City v West Ham United (11 May 2014) Premier League. Manchester City fans invaded the pitch at the City of Manchester Stadium after winning the Premier League title in dramatic circumstances, having been in a close race throughout the campaign only needing one point to win as they were significantly ahead of contenders Liverpool (who won their match that day 2–1 against Newcastle) in goal difference if the two teams had tied in points. This was the second time the club had won a Premier League title in three campaigns.
- Germany v Argentina (13 July 2014) World Cup Final. Russian comedian Vitaly Zdorovetskiy ran across the field in the second half of the match .
- Aston Villa v West Bromwich Albion (7 March 2015) FA Cup. Near the end of this FA Cup quarter-final between two fierce Midlands rivals, many Villa fans decided to invade the pitch before the final whistle had been blown. The referee halted the game before resuming. Upon the final whistle, both sets of fans ran on to the pitch. Aston Villa player Fabian Delph claimed he was bitten by a fan and other players were in danger of being attacked. Aston Villa fans were heavily criticised by the media for their actions with links being drawn to the frequent hooliganism of English football in the 1970s; 17 men were arrested on public offences. Aston Villa were later charged by the FA for their failure to sufficiently control the chaos.
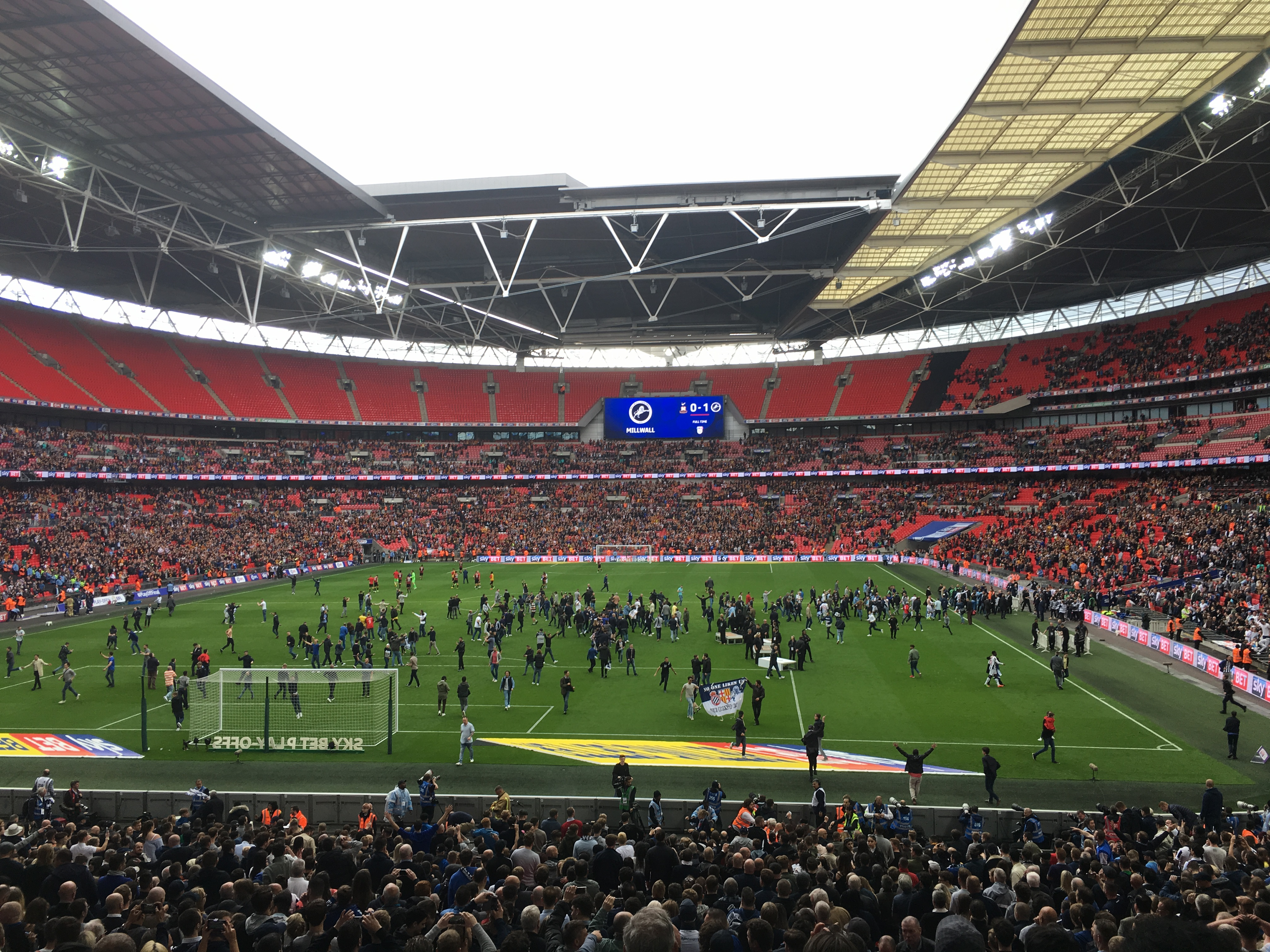
  The first pitch invasion at the new Wembley Stadium by Millwall supporters, May 2017.
- Sarajevo v Sloboda Tuzla (30 May 2015) Premier League of Bosnia and Herzegovina. Fans of Sarajevo invaded the pitch after their team won the league after 8 years. The match ended with 3–1 in favour of FK Sarajevo. The game did not even end while the athletic field around the pitch was already crowded with fans. The final whistle marked the entrance of the fans onto the pitch.
- Rangers v Hibernian (21 May 2016) Scottish Cup final. Fans of Hibernian invaded the pitch after their team won their first Scottish Cup since 1902.
- Coventry City v Wycombe Wanderers (7 February 2017) EFL Trophy Semi-Final. Coventry fans invade the pitch at the Ricoh Arena after beating Wycombe Wanderers 2–1 to reach the EFL Trophy final at Wembley.
- Tottenham Hotspur v Manchester United (14 May 2017) Premier League Fans of Tottenham Hotspur invaded the pitch after a 2–1 victory over Manchester United ended their time at White Hart Lane.
- Bradford City v Millwall. (20 May 2017) EFL League One play-off final. In the new Wembley's first, and so far only, pitch invasion, fans of Millwall invaded the pitch after their team returned to the EFL Championship for the first time since their relegation in 2015.
- Doncaster Rovers v Blackburn Rovers (24 April 2018). Hundreds of Blackburn fans invaded the pitch following the conclusion of their 1–0 win at the Keepmoat Stadium, a result which secured their immediate return to the EFL Championship following a one-year stint in the third tier of English football, EFL League One.
- Coventry City v Morecambe (5 May 2018) League Two. Coventry fans invade the pitch after a 0–0 draw, to celebrate reaching the League Two play-offs, which they would go on to win, to achieve an immediate return to League One.
- 2018 UEFA Champions League Final (26 May 2018) At the 93rd minute of the UCL final in Kyiv, Cristiano Ronaldo was about to score what would have been his last Real Madrid goal, but he was stopped by a pitch invader, captured by stadium security guards.
- 2018 FIFA World Cup Final (France v Croatia; 15 July 2018). Four people invaded the pitch during the second half of the FIFA World Cup final in Russia, forcing a brief stoppage in play. Russian feminist rock band and protest group Pussy Riot claimed responsibility for the interruption.
- Leyton Orient v Braintree Town (27 April 2019) National League . Leyton Orient fans invaded the pitch after their 0–0 draw with Braintree Town saw them get promoted to League Two After 2 Seasons in the National League.
- 2019 UEFA Champions League Final (1 June 2019) A female streaker invaded the pitch at the 18th minute of the UCL final in Madrid. She was the girlfriend of Vitaly Zdorovetskiy, who had invaded the pitch in the World Cup final five years earlier.
- Colchester United v Tottenham Hotspur (24 September 2019) EFL Cup. Fans of League Two Colchester United invaded the pitch after knocking out Tottenham Hotspur, one of the top six Premier League clubs, in a shootout after a 0–0 draw.
- Finland v Liechtenstein (15 November 2019) UEFA Euro 2020 qualifying. Finland supporters invaded the pitch after a 3–0 win over Liechtenstein secured their qualification to Euro 2020, which was the first time that they have qualified for the finals of a major tournament.
- Shrewsbury Town v Liverpool (26 January 2020) FA Cup. Shrewsbury fans invaded the pitch after seeing their team come back from a 2–0 deficit to draw with Liverpool, who were 16 points clear at the top of the Premier League and 59 places above them (Liverpool went on to win the Premier League title that season) and force a replay at Anfield.
- Manchester United v Liverpool (2 May 2021), fans stormed the pitch 2 hours before kick off to protest the Glazer Family, (club owners) this ultimately led to the match being postponed, some fans even protested outside the team's hotel.
- Everton v Crystal Palace (19 May 2022), fans invaded the pitch following Dominic Calvert-Lewin's 85th-minute header to complete a miraculous turnaround following being 2-nil down inside 36 minutes. The ensuing pitch invasion took several minutes to complete, with a larger pitch invasion occurring following the full-time result to secure Everton's Premier League safety. Controversially, Crystal Palace manager Patrick Vieira kicked a fan after taunting him. Merseyside Police took no further action.
- Manchester City v Aston Villa (22 May 2022). Manchester City fans invaded the pitch after winning the Premier League coming back from 2–0 against Aston Villa. Tensions erupt as Aston Villa goalkeeper Robin Olsen was assaulted by City fans during the pitch invasion. Manchester City would later issue an apology to the Swedish international and that, once identified, the individual would receive an indefinite stadium ban."
- Sassuolo v A.C. Milan (22 May 2022). A.C. Milan fans invaded the pitch after winning the Scudetto for the first time since 2010/2011 season by beating Sassuolo 3–0.
- Saint-Étienne v Auxerre (29 May 2022) Saint-Étienne fans invaded the pitch after losing a penalty shootout that sent them down to Ligue 2.
- Arema v Persebaya Surabaya (1 October 2022). Approximately 3000 Arema supporters invaded the pitch following their loss. The police began using tear gas in an attempt to disperse the rioters on the pitch, but the police also shot tear gas towards the stands. This led to a crowd crush that killed 131 people.
- Wrexham v Boreham Wood (22 April 2023). Wrexham fans invaded the pitch after their club's 3–1 win over Boreham Wood, which saw the Welsh club secure automatic promotion back into the EFL League Two, thus playing in the EFL for the first time since 2008. Highlighted in the S2 finale of Welcome to Wrexham.
- Espanyol v Barcelona (14 May 2023). Espanyol fans invaded the pitch after their club's 2–4 loss over city rivals Barcelona, which saw the Spanish club later being relegated back into the Segunda División, thus playing in Segunda División for the first time since 2021.
- 2023 FIFA Women's World Cup final (Spain v England; 20 August 2023). In the 23rd minute of the match, while England was about to take a free kick, Johnson Wen, an Australian national notable for his history of pitch invasion, ran on the field while wearing an anti-Putin shirt.
- Fenerbahçe v Trabzonspor (17 March 2024). Trabzonspor fans invaded the pitch, attacked Fenerbahçe players after Fenerbahçe players celebrated their 3–2 win.
- Bayer Leverkusen v Werder Bremen (14 April 2024). Leverkusen fans invaded the pitch after their club's 5–0 win over Werder Bremen, which saw the German club secure the Bundesliga championship for the first time ever.
- Central Coast Mariners v Melbourne Victory (25 May 2024). Mariners fans invaded the pitch following their team's 3–1 extra-time win over Melbourne Victory in the Grand Final
- Grimsby Town v Manchester United (27 August 2025). Grimsby fans invaded the pitch after their club's shootout win over Manchester United, one of the most supported clubs in the world, in the EFL Cup, winning 12–11 on penalties following a 2–2 draw.
- SK Slavia Prague v AC Sparta Prague (Prague derby, 9 May 2026). A few moments before the expected final whistle, with Slavia leading 3–2, Slavia supporters invaded the pitch to celebrate the league title. Ultras from Tribuna Sever (North Stand) then attacked Sparta players with pyrotechnics. The match was subsequently awarded to Sparta by forfeit (3–0). Slavia was fined 10 million CZK and ordered to play its next four home matches behind closed doors.
- Fleetwood v Arsenal (27 October 2026). Fans of League Two side Fleetwood invaded the pitch to celebrate beating the last season's Premier League champions, EFL Cup and Champions League runners-up Arsenal on penalties in an EFL Cup round of 16 matches.
- Singapore v Brazil (17 November 2026). A pitch invader took a selfie with Endrick of the Brazilian team near towards the end of the match between them and Singapore, and despite evading seven security officers, he was apprehended. The spokesperson identified the invader was a "minor" and was spoken to by the organisers The Kallang Group and Dentsu Sports International in the presence of a parent.

== Australian rules football ==
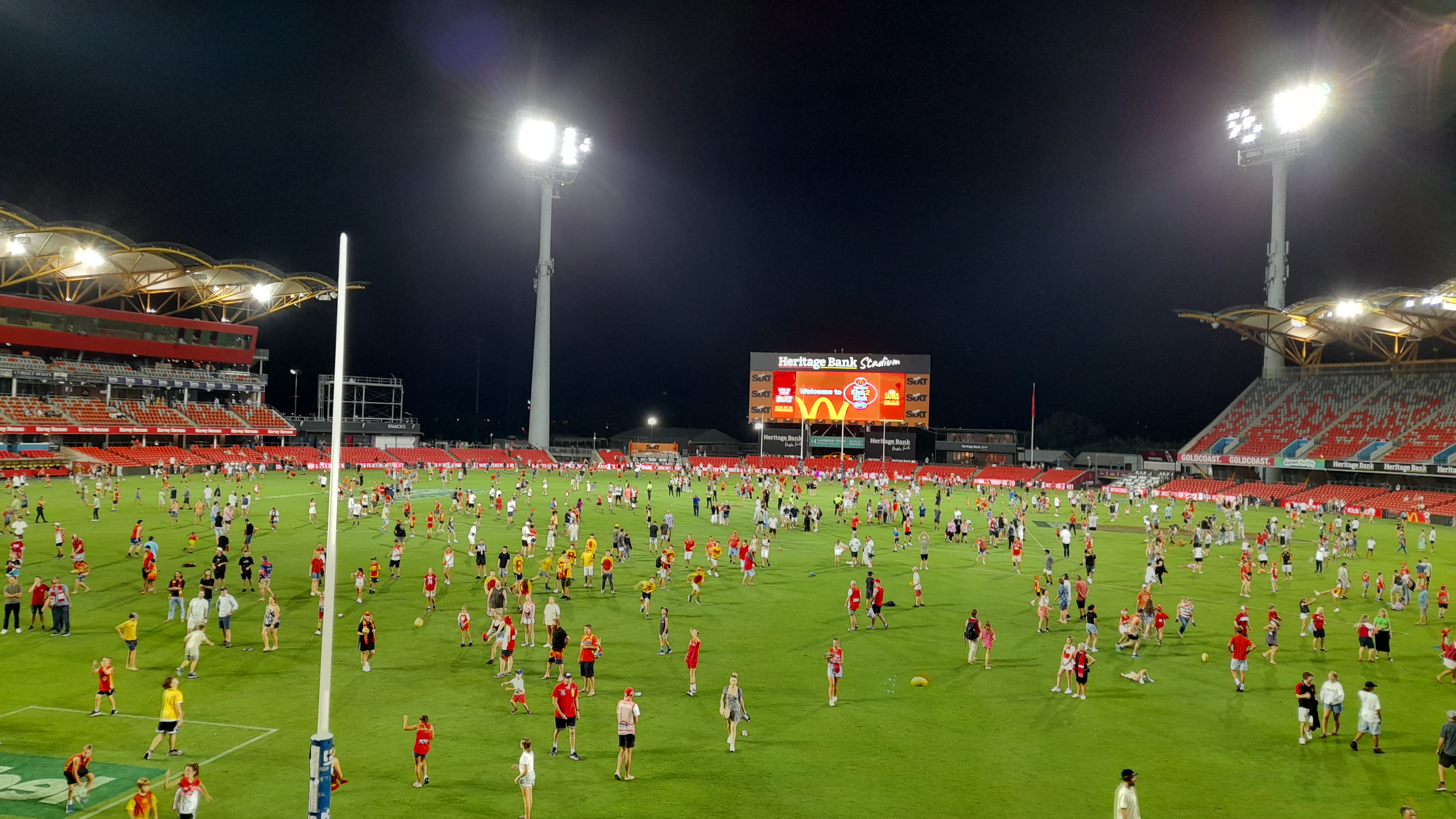
Fans allowed onto the field at Heritage Bank Stadium after an AFL match between the Gold Coast Suns and the Sydney Swans in 2023.

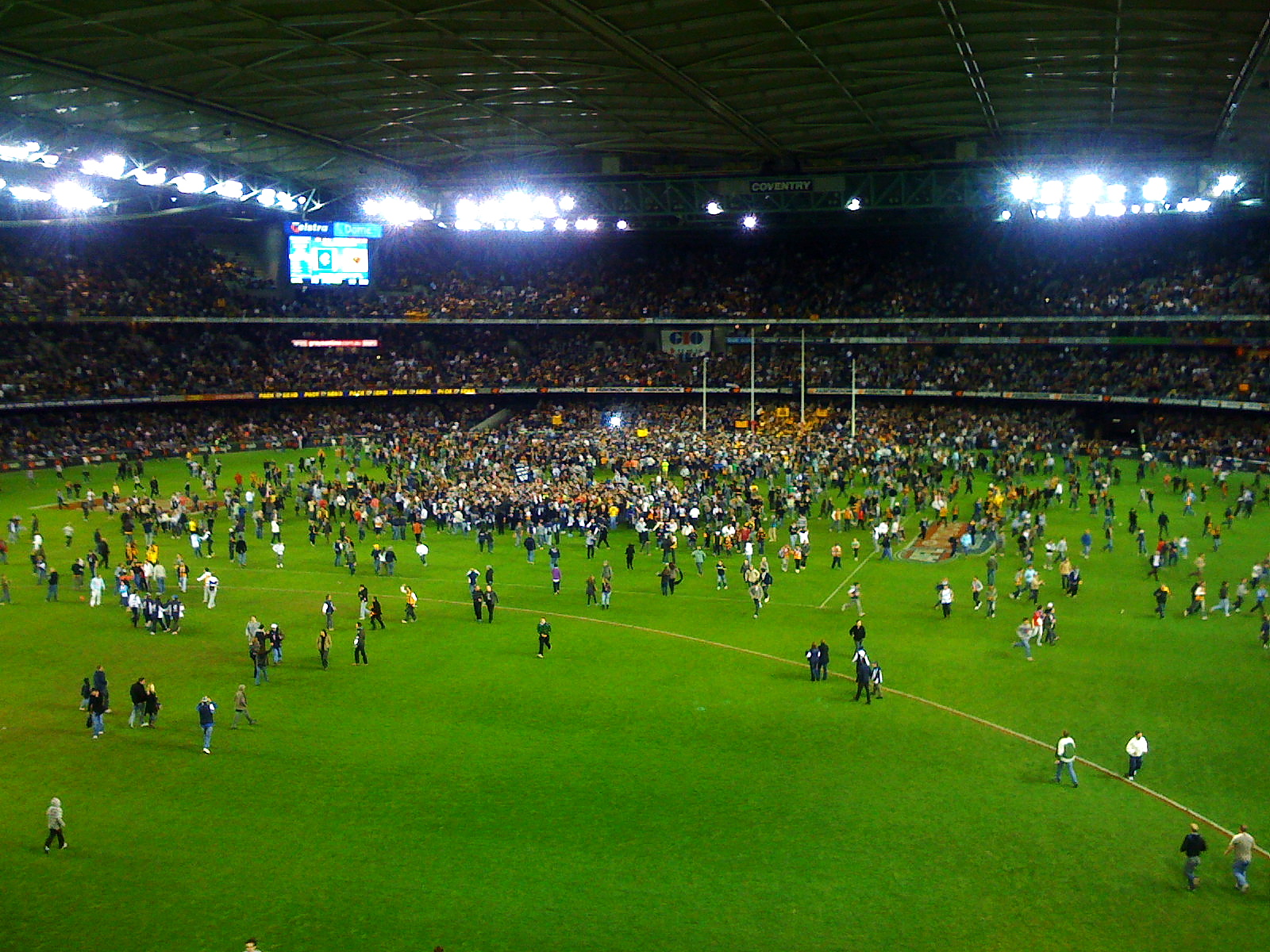
Spectators celebrating Buddy Franklin's 100th goal of the season in the final round of the regular AFL season.

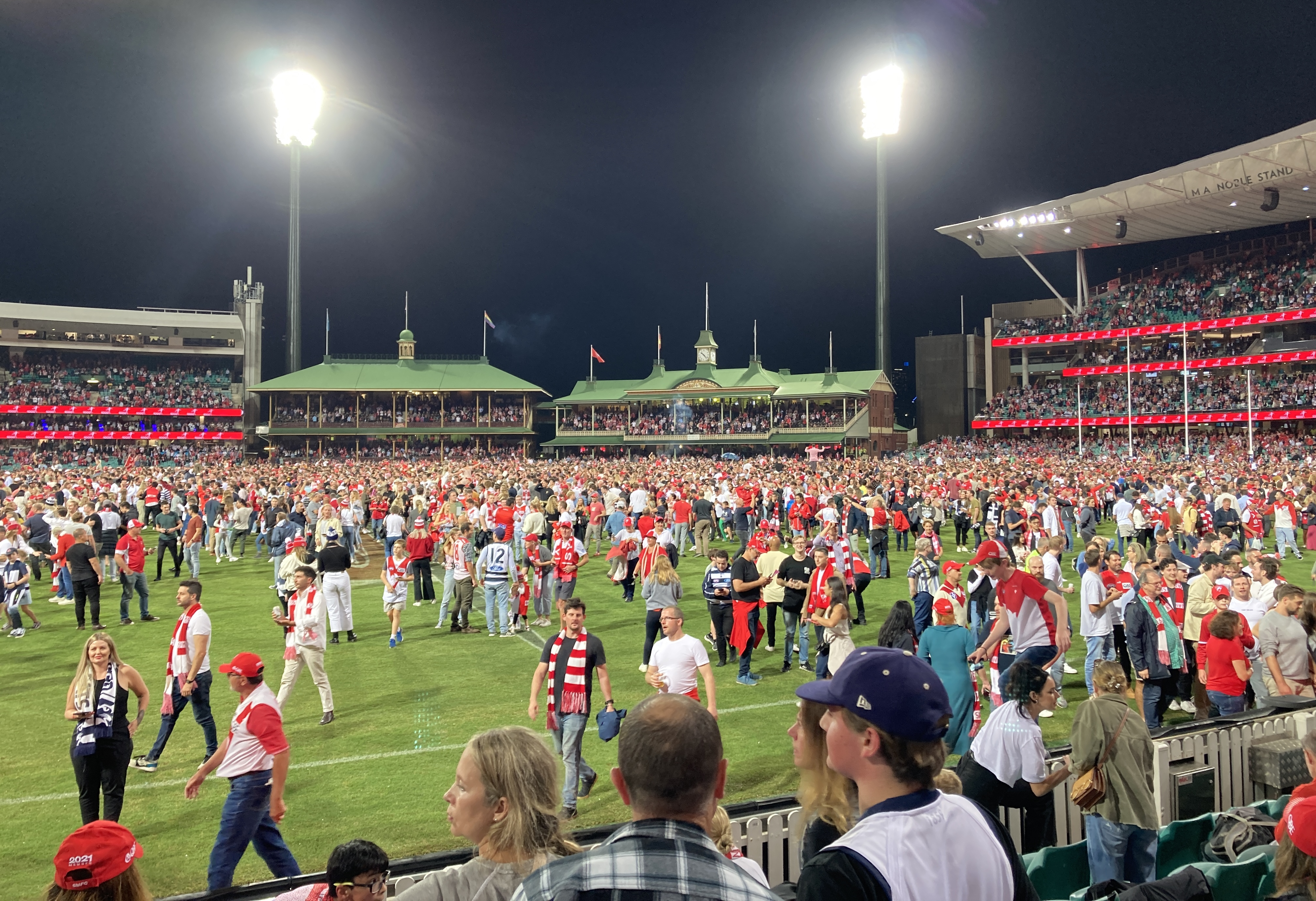
Fans flooding the Sydney Cricket Ground after Franklin's 1,000th AFL goal in 2022.

=== Post match kick-to-kick ===
Spectators on the playing field (i.e., rather than "pitch invasions") have long been a tradition of Australian rules football. At the end of an Australian rules match, it is traditional for supporters to run onto the field to celebrate the game and play games of kick-to-kick with their families. Supporters were once also able to do this during the half-time break. Since 2003, this was subject to stricter controls, and then finally banned altogether in games at Melbourne venues, in the elite Australian Football League; however, it is still common in suburban and state football leagues like the Victorian Football League as well as Australian Football League matches in New South Wales and Queensland.

=== Landmarks ===
It is common for football fans to engage in mid-match field invasions when a player reaches a landmark achievement, typically a 100th goal in a season, a 1000th career goal, or in the case of Tony Lockett's 1300th career goal in 1999, breaking the all-time goal-kicking record. The AFL has not yet succeeded in preventing these mid-match invasions, but players are duly protected by bodyguards, teammates and stadium security while supporters flood onto the field. Pitch invasions also occur when significant final occasions occur. For example, pitch invasions occurred after the Fitzroy Football Club's final VFL/AFL game in Victoria, as well as after the final AFL match was played at Waverley Park.

=== Streakers ===
The outlawed practice of "streaking" (running naked onto the ground) occurred in some big matches, most famously the performance of Helen d'Amico in the 1982 VFL Grand Final.

=== Hostile spectators ===
Although violent spectator playing field invasions both during and after matches were not uncommon in the early years of the VFL, and "spectator behaviour" was one of the main reasons that the VFA team Port Melbourne was not invited to become one of the VFL's foundation clubs in 1897, there have been a few occasions of hostile pitch invasions; the most famous of these occurred in the 1967 Tasmanian State Premiership Final, when hundreds of Wynyard fans invaded the field and tore down the goalposts to prevent North Hobart full forward David Collins from kicking a goal after the final siren. The Tasmanian Football League declared the match a no result and withheld the 1967 State Premiership.

Another hostile pitch invasion occurred in an AFL night game between St Kilda and Essendon in 1996, when the floodlights at Waverley Park lost power during the third quarter; fans rioted in the darkness and, coincidentally, also took down the goalposts. After an AFL meeting, the final quarter of the game was played three days later.

=== Animals on the playing field ===
On 9 May 1914, in the third quarter of the match between the Clayton Football Club, a Melbourne suburban team, and the Clyde Football Club, an enraged bull invaded the playing field. The players and spectators scattered, some vaulting fences into the next-door market garden, with the majority taking shelter in the dressing shed. The bull's first charge at the dressing sheds shook the building. Its second charge smashed the door, but the shed's doorway was too narrow for it to actually enter the room. Those inside maintained a barrage of boots, coats, and everything possible to scare the bull away. Eventually it was removed by a local farmer, who took it to a secure paddock. In a more humorous modern incident, a pig named "Plugger" was let loose on the ground in round 18, 1993.

== Baseball ==
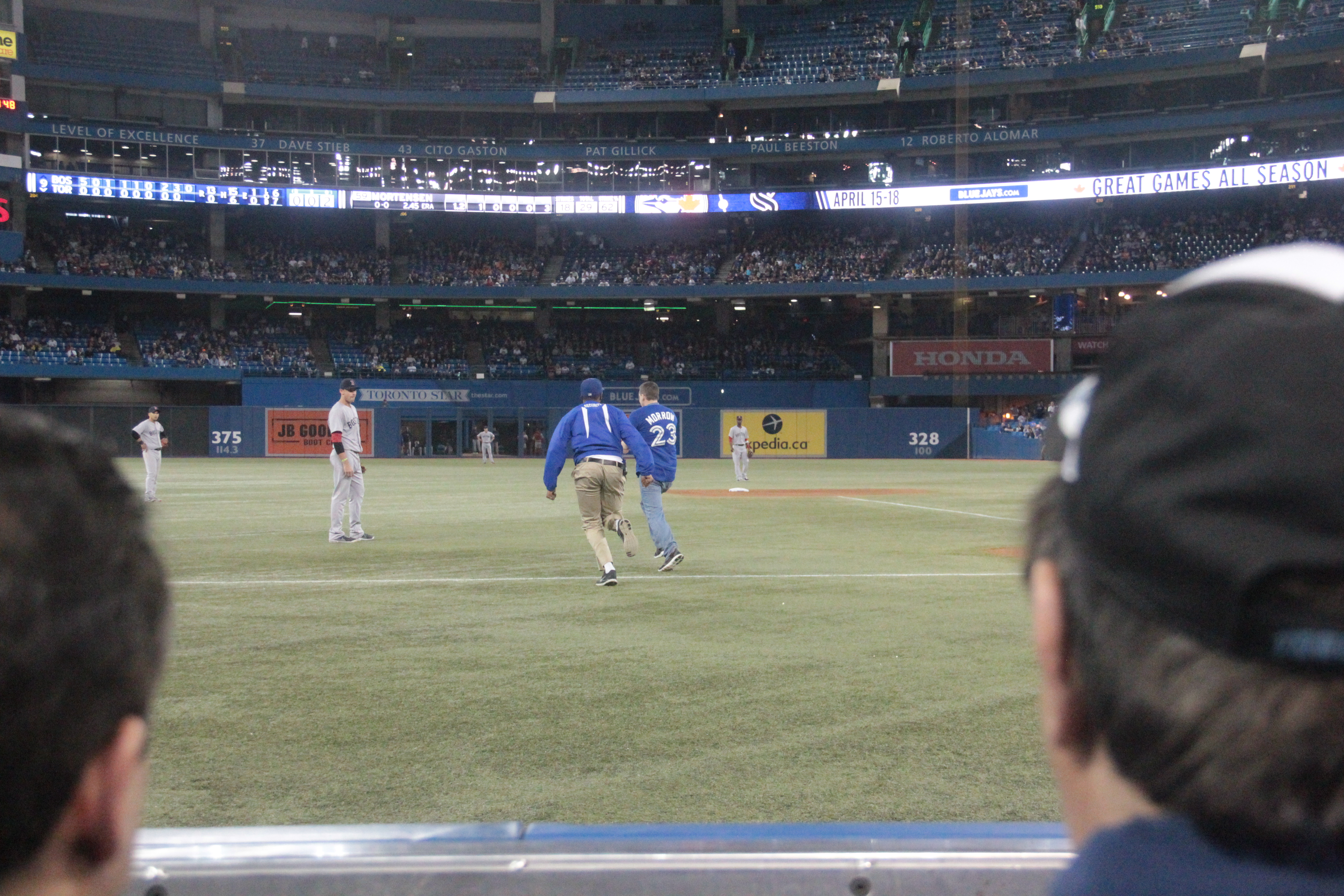
Field intrusion at Blue Jays baseball game

In modern baseball, the field is typically rushed by one or a small number of attention seeking fans or pranksters, rather than a large number of people although more-generalized riots have occurred. Almost universally, intruders will be ejected from the ballpark and potentially banned for life from it, and may also face criminal charges depending on the nature of the offence.

In cases when a game is broadcast on television and a person or small group runs onto the field, the broadcaster will cut to another camera shot elsewhere in the stadium, the commentators in the press box, or commercial breaks, instead of focusing on the intruders; this is to avoid giving attention to their behavior, and discouraging imitators who might try the same thing (and as, occasionally, the person is also a streaker, to avoid showing nudity). Radio play-by-play announcers will look at it in amusement, and add color to the broadcast, as the rusher is not visible in that medium; Kevin Harlan, who is the main play-by-play announcer for the NFL on Westwood One, has been lauded for his colorful descriptions of various field rushers.

Outside game action, teams do allow spectators on the field (usually children) after games, allowing them to either walk around the warning track and tour the field, or run the bases as part of promotional events, before the grounds crew restricts further intrusion to maintain the field for the next game.

=== Incidents ===
- New York Yankees at Washington Senators (30 September 1971; American League). With the Senators preparing to move to the Dallas-Fort Worth area the following season, thousands of non-paying spectators entered RFK Stadium for the Senators' final home game after security left mid-game. In the top of the ninth inning, with two out and the Senators leading 7–5, several hundred fans ran onto the field, tearing up the turf and stealing bases for souvenirs. Without security, order could not be restored, and the game was forfeited to the Yankees.
- Los Angeles Dodgers at Atlanta Braves (8 April 1974; National League). On this evening, Hank Aaron hit his 715th home run, breaking the record previously set by Babe Ruth, and two 17-year-old students ran on the field and rounded the bases with him, to Aaron's astonishment and surprise. Though both were quickly caught, there was no malicious intent in the rush as the men merely wanted to congratulate him, and their charges were dropped the next morning.
- Texas Rangers at Cleveland Indians (4 June 1974; American League). In an effort to increase attendance, the Indians arranged a "Ten Cent Beer Night" promotion, drawing over 25,000 fans—three times their normal home crowd. The game itself was plagued by sporadic pitch invasions and objects thrown into the field by inebriated fans. In the ninth inning, a scuffle between an intruder and Texas outfielder Jeff Burroughs ended with a riot involving thousands of fans and both teams, and the Indians were forfeited by umpire crew chief Nestor Chylak, who had a chair broken over his head during the melee.
- Chicago Cubs at Los Angeles Dodgers (25 April 1976; National League). Two protesters, William Thomas and his 11-year-old son, ran into the outfield at Dodger Stadium and tried to set fire to an American flag they had brought with them. Chicago outfielder Rick Monday noticed they had placed the flag on the ground and were fumbling with matches and lighter fluid; he then dashed over and grabbed the flag from the ground to thunderous cheers. He handed the flag to Los Angeles pitcher Doug Rau, after which the ballpark police officers arrested the two intruders. When he came up to bat in the next half-inning, he got a standing ovation from the Los Angeles crowd and the big message board behind the left-field bleachers in the stadium flashed the message, "RICK MONDAY... YOU MADE A GREAT PLAY..." He later said, "If you're going to burn the flag, don't do it around me. I've been to too many veterans' hospitals and seen too many broken bodies of guys who tried to protect it." On 25 August 2008, Monday (who would be coincidentally traded to the Dodgers the next season and has been a longtime team broadcaster) was presented with an American flag flown over Valley Forge National Historical Park in honor of his 1976 rescue.
- Kansas City Royals at New York Yankees (14 October 1976; American League Championship Series). Chris Chambliss hit a walk-off home run in game five of the series to send the Yankees to their first World Series in twelve years, and fans rushed onto the field while Chambliss circled the bases. The scene was so frenetic that Chambliss himself was not even sure he touched home plate in the chaos, and after being asked about this by third baseman Graig Nettles, had to be escorted back onto the field by police after fans had left to step on home plate in view of home plate umpire Art Frantz.
- Los Angeles Dodgers at New York Yankees (18 October 1977; World Series). With the Yankees leading by a large margin in the top of the ninth inning of the decisive sixth game, despite repeated warnings from public address announcer Bob Sheppard, fans boldly sat on top of the outfield wall intending to rush the field the moment the final out was made. After some fans went so far as to throw firecrackers onto the outfield, Yankees right fielder Reggie Jackson, who had all but secured the Series MVP award by hitting three home runs in the game, was so fearful for his own safety that he had a batting helmet brought out from the dugout prior to the final out. Immediately after the Yankees won the championship, a visibly panicked Jackson was filmed running from the outfield to the dugout at full speed, knocking over at least two spectators along the way.
- Detroit Tigers at Chicago White Sox (12 July 1979; American League). In a promotion famously known as Disco Demolition Night fans were invited to bring disco records with them to Comiskey Park. The records would then be destroyed in between games of a doubleheader. Fans were so caught up in the anti-disco mania that fans stormed the field and a near-riot broke out. The second game had to be cancelled and was eventually forfeited by the White Sox.
- Kansas City Royals at Chicago White Sox (19 September 2002; American League) Two fans, a father and son, ran onto the field and attacked Royals first base coach Tom Gamboa. The Royals were able to separate the attackers from Gamboa. Gamboa suffered permanent hearing loss in his right ear. The father received 30 months probation for the incident, while his 15-year-old son received five years probation.

=== Morganna, the Kissing Bandit ===
Morganna, the Kissing Bandit became famous for rushing the field in baseball and other sports from the early 1970s through the 1980s. She rushed the field on numerous occasions and kissed many Major League Baseball players including Nolan Ryan, Pete Rose, Johnny Bench, George Brett (twice), Steve Garvey, and Cal Ripken Jr.

== Basketball ==
College basketball has a similar phenomenon, known as "storming the court". This happens for the same reasons any field is rushed. In high school and some colleges, walking on the court is the only way to exit from the stands; however, there are usually officials and security personnel and laid-out security stanchions that limit how far spectators can walk onto the court, at least while players and game officials are still leaving the court. After the 2004 Malice at the Palace incident in the NBA, spectators were placed under a league-wide universal code of conduct that assesses severe penalties for intruding on the court (inclusive of other interference such as object tossing and player obstruction), including arrest, with some college conferences and high school sanctioning bodies also developing their own similar codes of conduct as spectator abuse of officials has become more pronounced and visible.

=== Incidents ===
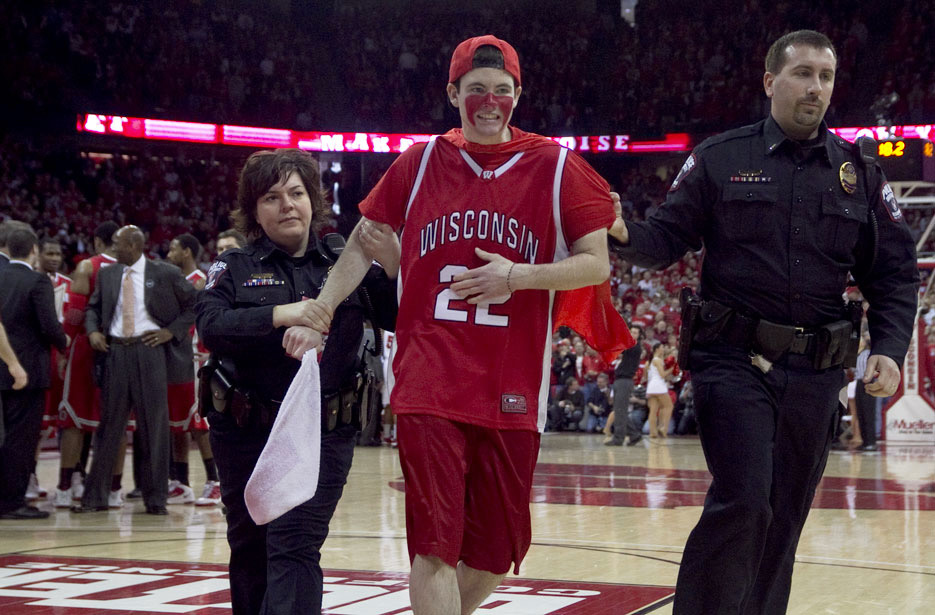
Michael Field the caped invader at the Kohl center in Madison Wisconsin.

On 19 November 2004, during the Malice at the Palace, at least two Detroit Pistons fans managed to invade the floor of The Palace of Auburn Hills to confront the Indiana Pacers' Ron Artest.

On 12 February 2011, Michael Field, originally of Marshfield, WI, stormed the court of the Kohl Center at the University of Wisconsin–Madison with 18 seconds remaining in the game. Michael was clad in a red Wisconsin cape and upon rushing the floor, bear-hugged Point Guard Jordan Taylor. He was detained and led-off in handcuffs, but he was quickly released after the entire student section rushed the floor 18 seconds later after the Badgers defeated No. 1 Ohio State. No one was injured and no charges were filed. The nickname "Caped Invader" lives on in Wisconsin Basketball lore to this day.

The Indiana University men's basketball team defeated the No. 1 ranked Kentucky Wildcats 73–72 on 10 December 2011, after a three-point shot by Christian Watford with no time left on the clock. Fans at Indiana's Assembly Hall filled the court within seconds to create a series of iconic images. ESPN commentator Dick Vitale, who was covering the game for the network, said it was the "best game of the year" and that "[t]he atmosphere there was unreal, as I felt the building shaking after Watford hit the shot." Watford's shot won an ESPY Award for Best Play. Kentucky avenged their loss on their way to a National Championship later that season by defeating Indiana 102-90 during the Sweet Sixteen round of the 2012 NCAA Men's Division I Basketball Tournament.

Hundreds of students from Iowa State University stormed the court after the No. 4-ranked Cyclones' 83-82 come-from-behind victory over in-state rival Iowa 11 December 2015, at Hilton Coliseum in Ames, Iowa. In the aftermath, Des Moines Register sports columnist Randy Peterson suffered a leg fracture. The incident raised awareness of the dangers of court storming, but when asked about it in a post-game interview, Iowa State coach Steve Prohm stated, "That's part of college athletics. That's a great moment. Those college kids ... they've been camping out here (for tickets) for three days. There's only probably 10 schools that do that in the country. Give them their 15 or 20 minutes to do that. I thought it was pretty cool."

Court storming in collegiate athletics came under further scrutiny following a pair of high-profile incidents that occurred during the 2023-24 basketball season. The first involved University of Iowa women's basketball star Caitlin Clark colliding with a fan who rushed the court after Ohio State's win over the Hawkeyes in Columbus, Ohio. Several weeks later, Kyle Filipowski of the Duke Blue Devils had to be carried off the court after appearing to suffer an injury from coming into contact with a fan at Wake Forest University. In the wake of the Filipowski incident, several coaches including Duke's Jon Scheyer called for the practice to be abolished entirely. Meanwhile, ESPN analyst Jay Bilas indicated that fans who engage in such conduct should face criminal penalties. “There's no accountability for this," he argued. "The fans feel like it's an entitlement. And the universities like it. And the truth is, we like it.”

The 2023 FIBA Basketball World Cup in the Philippines had a court storming incident. Prior to the start of the New Zealand vs United States game at the Mall of Asia Arena in Pasay on 26 August 2023, a ticket-paying fan wearing a full New Zealand jersey stormed the court. He was stopped after the New Zealand bench informed the organizers that the fan was not part of their team.

On 3 June 2026, a fan invaded the Frost Bank Center floor to attempt to take a selfie with San Antonio Spurs center Victor Wembanyama during Game One of the 2026 NBA Finals. He and his accomplice were banned for life from all National Basketball Association arenas.

=== High schools ===
Although not as well publicized as college incidents, fans storming the court after a big win is not uncommon at the high school level. The injuries suffered by several people following the Iowa State University men's basketball team's win over the University of Iowa in December 2015 prompted the Iowa Girls High School Athletic Union to issue a memorandum to athletic directors and coaches to remind fans that the organization and its sister organization, the Iowa High School Athletic Association, have policies prohibiting court storming after post-season games. "I have to wonder if the person injured was the star player, the coach, or one of the game officials if the attitude and need for 'storming the court' might change?" wrote IGHSAU executive director Mike Dick.

== Cricket ==
It used to be a common occurrence at the end of cricket Test matches for the crowd to invade the pitch to watch the presentation from the pavilion balcony. In the UK, this tradition ended in 2001 after a steward was injured in a pitch invasion at a one-day match between England and Pakistan. Invading the pitch can now warrant a £1,000 fine and a lifetime ban from the ground. Post-match presentations are now held on the field or in a room within the venue restricted from public access and displayed on a video scoreboard if available.

In August 1975, vandals protesting the imprisonment of alleged armed robber George Davis invaded the pitch of the Headingley Cricket Ground before the final day of the Third Ashes Test between England and Australia, digging holes in the field and covering one end of the pitch in oil. This led to the first-ever declaration of a Test ground being unfit for play, resulting in the match being abandoned and declared a draw. This was significant as it denied England a chance to tie the series and potentially retain the Ashes; Australia eventually took back the Ashes. In 1982, a pitch invasion at the WACA led to Australian bowler Terry Alderman suffering a shoulder injury when attempting to apprehend one of the intruders.

Two One Day International matches at the Bourda ground in Georgetown, Guyana have had their results disrupted by pitch invasions. In 1993, the crowd invaded on the last ball of a match as the West Indies ran a second run to tie the score against Pakistan; then, in 1999, the crowd invaded on the last ball of a match as Australia ran a third run to tie the score against the West Indies. In both cases, the fielding team had been a chance of effecting a run-out to prevent the tying run, had the crowd not invaded; but in both cases, match referee Raman Subba Row declared the match to be tied.

== Gaelic football and hurling ==
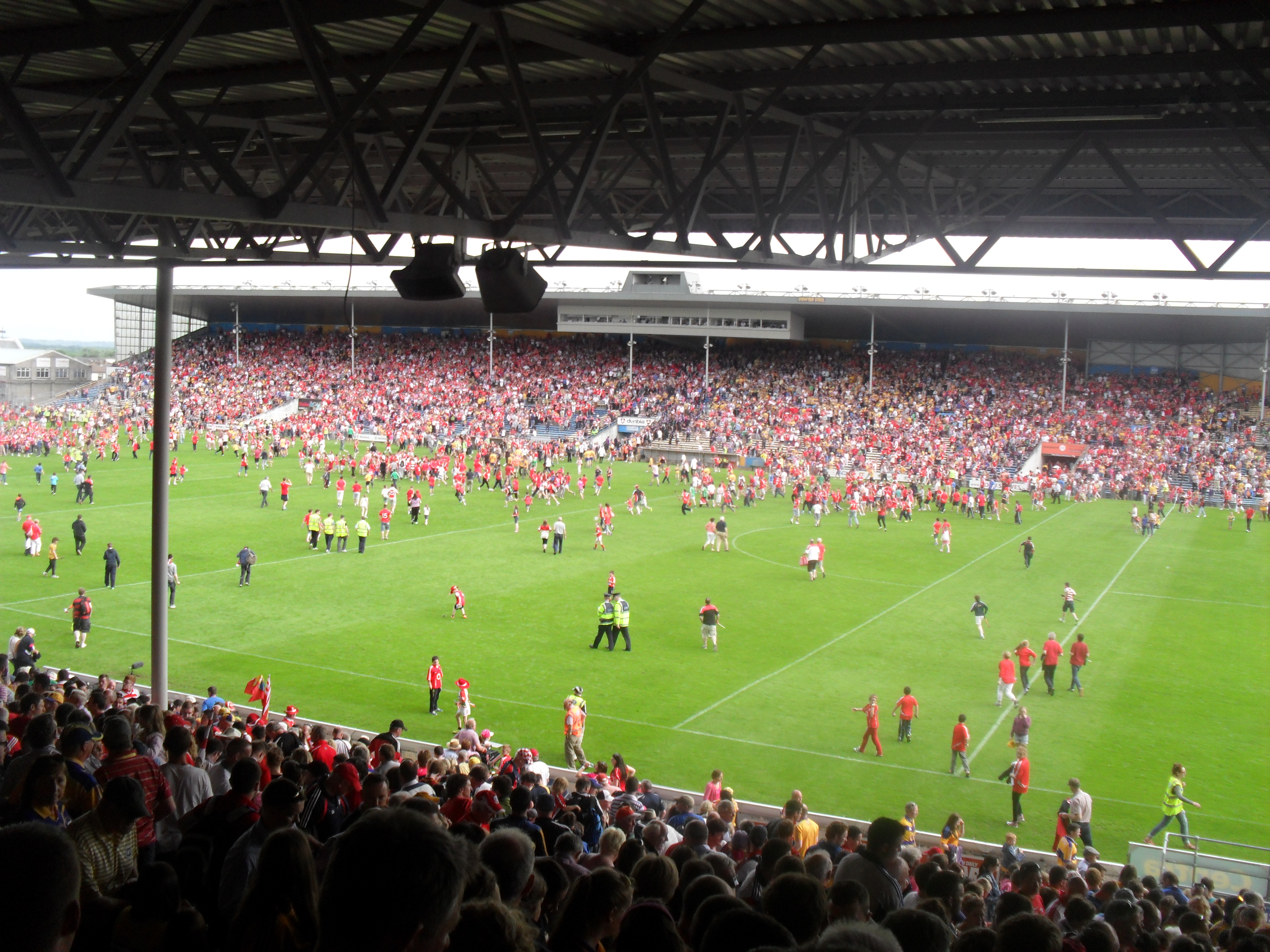
Cork supporters invade the field at Semple Stadium after a game, 2014

In Gaelic football and hurling, both national sports of Ireland, pitch invasions were acceptable and most widely seen at Provincial and All-Ireland Finals; however, there has only been one occurrence at Croke Park, after the 2010 Leinster Senior Football Championship Final, due to a crackdown since 2009 by the GAA, though they still occur in other stadia around the country.

== International rules football ==
International rules football, a hybrid of Aussie Rules and Gaelic football is not known for pitch invasions; however, a famous one occurred in the first test of the 2006 International Rules Series at Pearse Stadium, Galway after Ireland defeated Australia.

== Rugby league ==
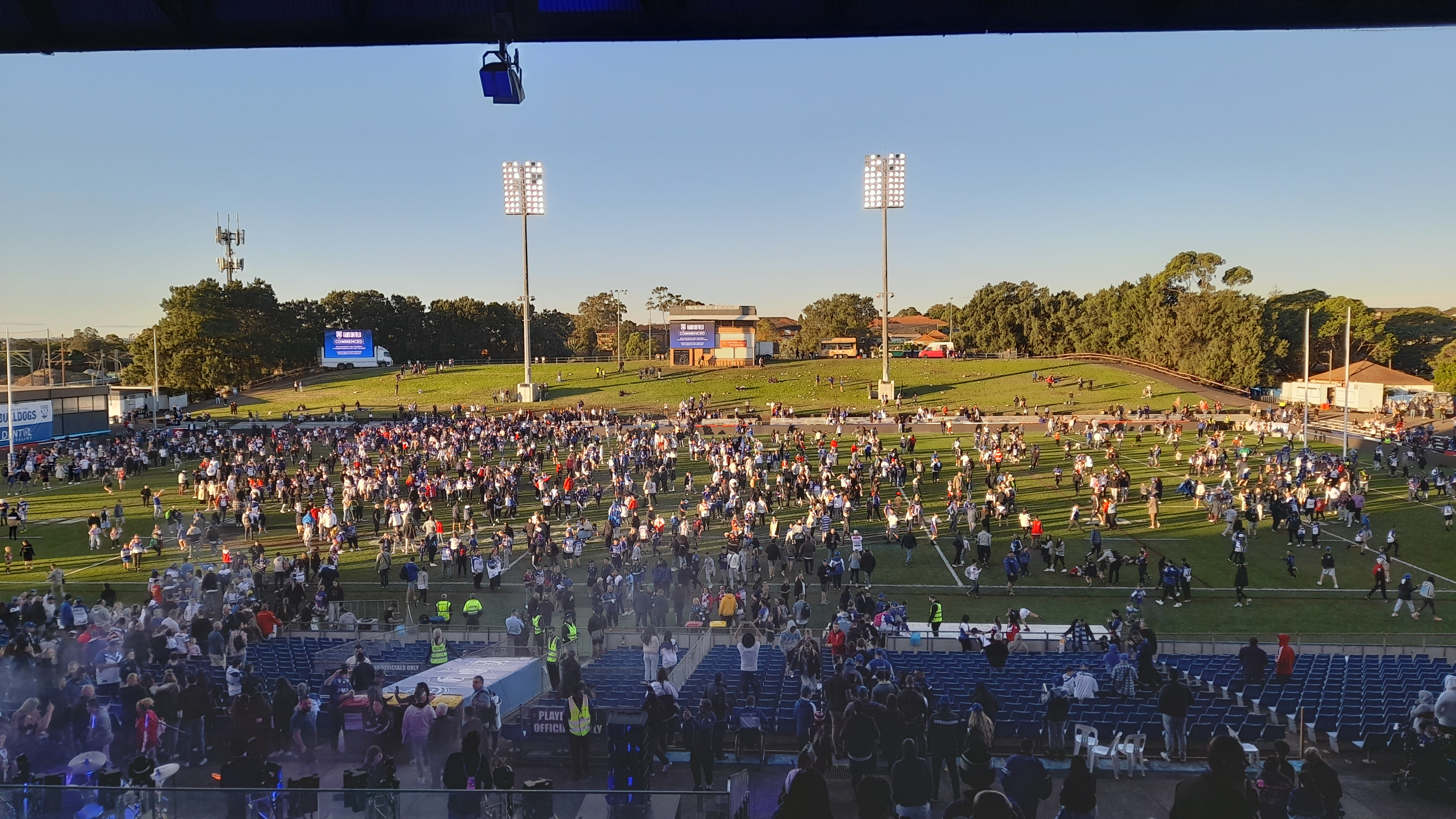
Fans allowed onto the pitch of Belmore Sports Ground following the completion of the Canterbury-Bankstown Bulldogs vs St George Illawarra Dragons match in 2022.

In New South Wales Rugby League matches up until the 1980s, spectators often took to the field on the completion of the match within seconds after the final siren. This required the players to navigate through a crowd of people when coming off the field, and the cardboard corner posts were usually taken as "souvenirs". This practice was discouraged when the publicly viewable game clock stopped with five minutes to play in order to ensure that spectators, not knowing when the game was about to finish, could not jump the gun and enter the playing arena with the game unfinished. Eventually the tradition died out, and spectators rarely, if ever, take the field in the present day National Rugby League; fines of $7000 and lifetime bans exist for those who do so.

On 13 March 2026, a mid-match pitch invasion occurred when South Sydney Rabbitohs winger Alex Johnston scored the record-breaking 213th try of his National Rugby League (NRL) career during the second half of the round two match against the Sydney Roosters at Allianz Stadium.

Pitch invasions have sometimes occurred in Hull Derby fixtures between Hull Kingston Rovers (Hull KR) and Hull FC in northern England. Following the conclusion of a derby match at Hull KR's Craven Park on 9 July 2007, in which Hull FC with a 30–20 scoreline, a small number Hull FC fans ran onto the pitch from the South Terrace to congratulate their players. Some Hull KR fans then ran onto the pitch in retaliation, resulting in four arrests for public order offences, FC centre Kirk Yeaman being headbutted and FC captain Lee Radford being spat at. Hull KR were later fined £7,500 (£5,000 of this suspended) and made to pay legal costs by the RFL governing body for not controlling spectators at their stadium. Another pitch invasion occurred at Craven Park in 2015 after Hull FC beat Hull KR 22–12, securing FC a Super League play-off spot.

== Rugby union ==
Pitch invasions have occurred throughout the history of rugby union, with some particular moments being the most infamous. In the past, additional security support has been constructed at stadiums due to foreseen trouble. An early example of this was at the 1924 Summer Olympics, when a wire fence was constructed to protect United States players.

=== Examples ===
- During the 1971 South Africa rugby union tour of Australia, hundreds were arrested after they tried to disrupt test matches between the Springboks and Australia in response to South African apartheid policies. Some people even attempted to saw down goalposts and dig trenches in the surface at the Sydney Cricket Ground to try to stop a test match going ahead, and in Queensland, a state of emergency was issued following fears prompted from the behaviour of people at the previous tests. Due to the success of the protests in disrupting the event, the Australian Cricket Board canceled the South African team's imminent tour due to security reasons.
- Perhaps the most infamous of pitch invasions at rugby matches occurred at the 1981 Springbok tour of New Zealand. At Rugby Park in Hamilton (now the site of Waikato Stadium), 350 people pulled down a fence to invade the pitch, and police were forced to cancel the match after arresting a number of people after they got word that an escaped prisoner was piloting a light plane to fly around the stadium. The last test at Eden Park in Auckland was disrupted after protesters threw flour bombs and other objects onto the pitch to disrupt the game.
- During a 2002 rugby Tri-Nations match in Durban between South Africa and New Zealand, a drunk South African fan, Pieter van Zyl, scaled a perimeter fence, ran onto the pitch and tackled referee David McHugh, leaving McHugh with a dislocated shoulder and having to be carried from the pitch on a stretcher. Springbok lock, AJ Venter punched van Zyl and All Blacks flanker Richie McCaw wrestled him to the ground whereupon police and security arrested him. van Zyl was convicted of trespassing and assault, and was sentenced to three months in jail, fined $275, and banned for life from attending rugby matches in South Africa.
- Another incident involving the South African team took place at the 2003 Rugby World Cup in Australia when an intoxicated Samoan fan, with his face painted in the red and blue of the Samoan flag, ran onto the pitch and attempted to tackle Springbok Louis Koen as he was kicking a goal in the late stages of a pool match against Samoa. Koen kicked the goal, but also managed to inadvertently knock the fan unconscious with a kick to the head, as the fan had tried to tackle Koen around the legs.
- During a 2011 Top 14 match between Basque rivals Biarritz and Bayonne, players from both teams were involved in a brief off-the-ball brawl, among them Biarritz' Basque star and France international Imanol Harinordoquy. His father Lucien ran onto the pitch to attempt to defend his son, but was quickly wrestled to the ground by Bayonne players and taken from the pitch. The elder Harinordoquy issued an apology after the match, with his son choosing not to comment on the affair.

== Arena sports ==
Most arena sports (like ice hockey, arena football, and indoor soccer) take precautions to separate the spectators from the players and to ensure one cannot cross into the other. This is not only for the protection of the players but also the spectators as it also helps prevent pucks, balls, and other objects from flying at speed into spectators, along with the players themselves, and causing injury. Often, in addition to sidewalls, Plexiglas panels are used as a safety measure. Ice hockey uses the panels around the ice, team benches, and penalty boxes to enforce separation under the rules, and after the death of a young spectator in Columbus, Ohio in 2002, tall netting above the Plexiglas to protect spectators in each shooting end from flying hockey pucks. Furthermore, the iced surface means stepping onto a hockey rink without skates is dangerous. A few attempts to intrude in arena games have usually ended with physical player intervention.

== Formula One ==
Horan invading the track at the 2003 British Grand Prix

Several track invasions occurred in Formula One during the 1990s and 2000s, such as when spectators entered the track after Nigel Mansell won at the 1992 British Grand Prix, his home race. The British Grand Prix would also see a track invasion in 2003 from Neil Horan, who went on the track waving a religious banner, which stated "Read the Bible. The Bible is always right".
