= 1952 Salford City Council election =

Local election in Salford

- 8 May 1952

16 of 64 seats on Salford City Council 33 seats needed for a majority
	First party	Second party
Party	Labour	Conservative
Last election	8 seats, 47.5%	8 seats, 52.4%
Seats before	45	19
Seats won	15	1
Seats after	49	15
Seat change	▲4	▼4
Popular vote	38,734	24,292
Percentage	59.1%	37.0%
Swing	▲11.6%	▼15.4%
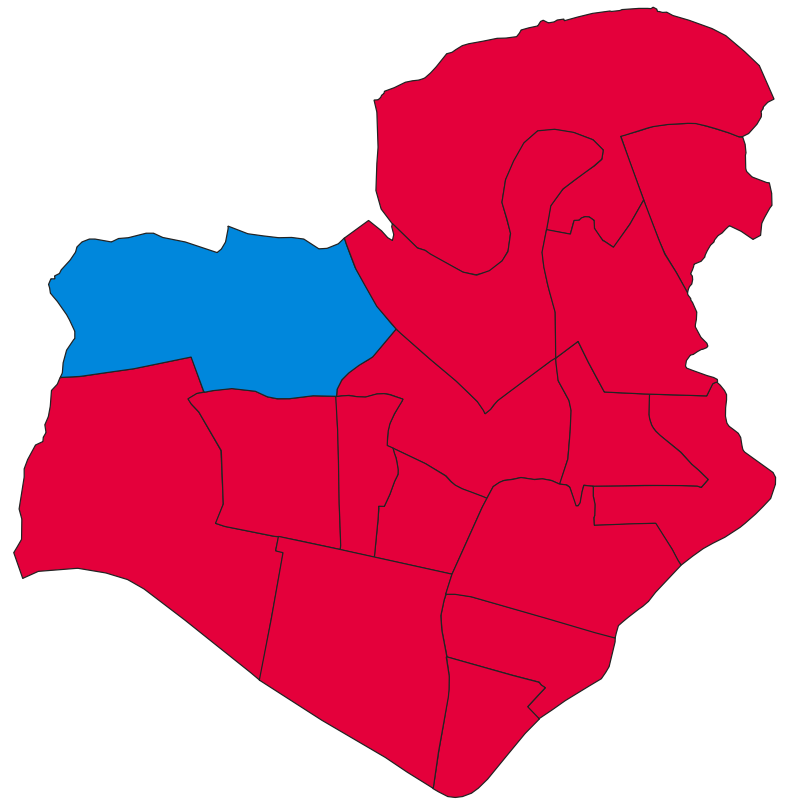
- Map of results of 1952 election
Leader of the Council before election
Labour
Leader of the Council after election
Labour

Elections to Salford City Council were held on Thursday, 8 May 1952. One-third of the councillors seats were up for election, with each successful candidate to serve a three-year term of office. The Labour Party retained overall control of the council.

== Election result ==
Party	Votes		Seats			Full Council	
Labour Party	38,734 (59.1%)	▲11.6	15 (93.8%)	15 / 16	▲4	49 (76.6%)	49 / 64
Conservative Party	24,292 (37.0%)	▼15.4	1 (6.2%)	1 / 16	▼4	15 (23.4%)	15 / 64
Liberal Party	2,444 (3.7%)	N/A	0 (0.0%)	0 / 16	N/A	0 (0.0%)	0 / 64
Communist	143 (0.2%)	▲0.1	0 (0.0%)	0 / 16	Steady	0 (0.0%)	0 / 64

=== Full council ===
↓
49	15

=== Aldermen ===
↓
16

=== Councillors ===
↓
33	15

== Ward results ==
=== Albert Park ===
Albert Park
Party	Candidate	Votes	%	±%
Labour	J. W. Bacon*	3,544	62.7	+12.8
Conservative	W. M. Westby	2,106	37.3	−12.8
Majority		1,438	25.4	
Turnout		5,650		
Labour hold		Swing		

=== Charlestown ===
Charlestown
Party	Candidate	Votes	%	±%
Labour	H. Calderwood*	2,672	63.0	+9.8
Conservative	H. Smeeton	1,428	33.7	−10.5
Communist	E. Grundy	143	3.3	+0.7
Majority		1,244	29.3	+20.3
Turnout		4,243		
Labour hold		Swing		

=== Claremont ===
Claremont
Party	Candidate	Votes	%	±%
Conservative	A. E. Clark*	3,288	49.3	−20.6
Labour	T. W. Thelwell	2,428	36.4	+6.3
Liberal	J. Percival	947	14.3	N/A
Majority		860	12.9	−26.9
Turnout		6,663		
Conservative hold		Swing		

=== Crescent ===
Crescent
Party	Candidate	Votes	%	±%
Labour	E. E. Mallinson*	1,765	63.6	+12.2
Conservative	N. J. Hockenhull	1,010	36.4	−12.2
Majority		755	27.2	+24.4
Turnout		2,775		
Labour hold		Swing		

=== Docks ===
Docks
Party	Candidate	Votes	%	±%
Labour	J. Hall*	2,442	66.6	+10.1
Conservative	J. T. Callison	1,224	33.4	−10.1
Majority		1,218	33.2	+20.2
Turnout		3,666		
Labour hold		Swing		

=== Kersal ===
Kersal
Party	Candidate	Votes	%	±%
Labour	G. D. Franks*	2,811	55.1	+15.8
Conservative	S. B. James	2,288	44.9	−15.8
Majority		523	10.2	
Turnout		5,099		
Labour gain from Conservative		Swing		

=== Langworthy ===
Langworthy
Party	Candidate	Votes	%	±%
Labour	N. Openshaw*	2,489	60.3	+14.2
Conservative	R. Walling	1,337	32.4	−21.5
Liberal	N. Bark	301	7.3	N/A
Majority		1,152	27.9	
Turnout		4,127		
Labour hold		Swing		

=== Mandley Park ===
Mandley Park
Party	Candidate	Votes	%	±%
Labour	H. Hopkinson	3,024	57.9	+19.2
Conservative	J. E. Bedell	2,195	42.1	−19.2
Majority		829	15.8	
Turnout		5,219		
Labour gain from Conservative		Swing		

=== Ordsall Park ===
Ordsall Park
Party	Candidate	Votes	%	±%
Labour	E. H. Hulse*	2,669	74.3	+10.9
Conservative	J. Shaw	925	25.7	−10.9
Majority		1,744	48.6	+21.8
Turnout		3,594		
Labour hold		Swing		

=== Regent ===
Regent
Party	Candidate	Votes	%	±%
Labour	T. J. Evason*	2,518	70.6	+17.6
Conservative	A. Eccleshall	1,047	29.4	−17.6
Majority		1,471	41.2	+35.2
Turnout		3,565		
Labour hold		Swing		

=== St. Matthias' ===
St. Matthias'
Party	Candidate	Votes	%	±%
Labour	B. Wilson*	2,064	63.3	+9.5
Liberal	K. Wolstenholme	1,196	36.7	N/A
Majority		968	26.6	+19.0
Turnout		3,260		
Labour hold		Swing		

=== St. Paul's ===
St. Paul's
Party	Candidate	Votes	%	±%
Labour	G. A. Marshall*	2,157	66.9	+15.0
Conservative	J. Livesley	1,067	33.1	−15.0
Majority		1,090	33.8	+30.0
Turnout		3,224		
Labour hold		Swing		

=== St. Thomas' ===
St. Thomas'
Party	Candidate	Votes	%	±%
Labour	H. Macfarlane*	1,917	68.5	+15.0
Conservative	R. Buchanan	882	31.5	−15.0
Majority		1,035	37.0	+30.0
Turnout		2,799		
Labour hold		Swing		

=== Seedley ===
Seedley
Party	Candidate	Votes	%	±%
Labour	M. Ferguson	2,290	53.0	+10.0
Conservative	W. E. Hargreaves	2,030	47.0	−10.0
Majority		260	6.0	
Turnout		4,320		
Labour gain from Conservative		Swing		

=== Trinity ===
Trinity
Party	Candidate	Votes	%	±%
Labour	J. Davis*	1,506	57.9	+10.6
Conservative	J. Davies	1,094	42.1	−10.6
Majority		412	15.8	
Turnout		2,600		
Labour hold		Swing		

=== Weaste ===
Weaste
Party	Candidate	Votes	%	±%
Labour	N. B. Capindale	2,438	50.7	+6.3
Conservative	G. H. Fearnley*	2,371	49.3	−6.3
Majority		67	1.4	
Turnout		4,809		
Labour gain from Conservative		Swing		
