= They think it's all over =

1966 quotation from Kenneth Wolstenholme

"They think it's all over" is a quote from Kenneth Wolstenholme's BBC TV commentary in the closing moments of the 1966 FIFA World Cup Final, when England beat West Germany 4–2 after extra time to win the FIFA World Cup. In the final few seconds of the match, Wolstenholme said:

And here comes Hurst! He's got...

(Wolstenholme is distracted by some of the crowd spilling onto the pitch)

Some people are on the pitch! They think it's all over!

(Geoff Hurst scores to put England two goals ahead)

It is now, it's four!

Soon after the 1966 victory, Wolstenholme's quote became a widely used expression.

== In popular culture ==
The phrase, along with other calls from English football matches, appears in New Order's song "World In Motion", although in that case Wolstenholme re-recorded it with the slightly different words "Well, some of the crowd are on the pitch. They think it's all over. Well it is now". The British band The Dentists called their first album Some People Are on the Pitch They Think It's All Over It Is Now in Wolstenholme's honour; the LP begins with a sample of Wolstenholme's original commentary. Track #3 on British folk metal act Skyclad's EP Jig-a-Jig is called "They Think It's All Over". The song contains the phrase "They think it's all over. Well is it now?" in its chorus and includes several references to the 1966 FIFA World Cup.

They Think It's All Over is also the title of the debut novel of journalist Andy Sambidge. Published in August 2026, the book tells the story of a fictional football referee strike in England and its financial and cultural impact.

In Neil Marshall's Dog Soldiers the last words that the character Cooper says are, "You think it's all over? It is now."

The quotation was also used as the title of the BBC's satirical sports quiz show They Think It's All Over, which appeared on BBC One from 1995 to 2006. The show has heightened the popularity of the phrase in recent years, though Kenneth Wolstenholme was reportedly unhappy with the use of the phrase for the title of the show.

An alternative mix for The Beatles song "Glass Onion", which appeared on Anthology 3, contained a portion of Kenneth Wolstenholme's commentary. At the end of the track he can be heard shouting "It's a goal!" repeating for several seconds until the track fades.

In the Discworld book Unseen Academicals the book has two false endings, each followed by "You think it's all over?" and at the actual end "It is Now!"

BBC parodist Dave Henson used the line to refer to the 1966 winning team during his parody of "I'll Be Missing You" by Puff Daddy and Faith Evans featuring 112 (which itself samples and interpolates "Every Breath You Take" by The Police).

Boys of '66 hey take a bow..
They think it's all over, it is now!

The video game Kinect Sports, which has football as one of the six sports represented, has two achievements that refer to the quote: "They Think It's All Over..." is awarded when the players wins their first football match, and "...It Is Now!" is obtained when the player wins with a goal scored in the final 10 seconds.

In the Cormoran Strike book The Cuckoo's Calling the code for the external keypad is 1966, and when Cormoran Strike is told the code, he quotes "They think it's all over?".

== See also ==
- "Your boys took one hell of a beating!"
