= Kenneth Wolstenholme =

English football commentator (1920–2002)

- Born: 17 July 1920; Worsley, Lancashire, England
- Died: 25 March 2002 (aged 81); Galmpton, Devon, England
- Occupations: Football commentator and presenter
- Years active: 1950–2002
- Known for: Presenting: Match of the Day; Football comment: "They think it's all over"
- Military career
- Allegiance: United Kingdom
- Branch: Royal Air Force
- Service years: 1939–1945
- Rank: Acting Squadron leader
- Awards: DFC & Bar

Kenneth Wolstenholme, DFC & Bar (17 July 1920 – 25 March 2002) was an English football commentator for BBC television in the 1950s and 1960s. He is best remembered for his commentary during the 1966 FIFA World Cup Final; in the closing minutes, Wolstenholme commented on a series of pitch invaders as Geoff Hurst dribbled down the pitch before scoring, saying "some people are on the pitch, they think it's all over!" The phrase has become deeply embedded in British popular culture. As Hurst proceeded to score, Wolstenholme added: 'It is now!'

== Early life ==
Wolstenholme was born in Worsley, Lancashire. His family were Primitive Methodists and his brother attended Elmfield College. He attended Farnworth Grammar School, where Alan Ball Jr. (on whom Wolstenholme commentated in the 1966 World Cup Final) was also a pupil some years later. Wolstenholme began his career as a journalist with a newspaper in Manchester.

=== Military service ===
As Wolstenholme was a member of the Royal Air Force Volunteer Reserve, he was soon called up at the outbreak of the Second World War. By 1941, he had qualified as a bomber pilot and was posted to 107 Squadron, flying Bristol Blenheim Mk. IVs out of RAF Great Massingham, Norfolk. At the start of 1943 he transferred to de Havilland Mosquito with 105 Squadron, part of Air Vice-Marshal Don Bennett's No. 8 Group RAF Pathfinder Group.

Wolstenholme completed more than 100 highly hazardous sorties over Occupied Europe and in May 1944 was awarded the DFC. The following year, he won a Bar to his DFC for his continual bravery in raids on Germany in a period of exceptionally heavy night fighter activity. He finished the war as an acting squadron leader, having spent its last stages working in the RAF's public relations department.

== Sports broadcasting ==
After the war, he became a freelance journalist, working for BBC Radio before moving to television in 1950. In 1955, he provided a location report from Salford for the BBC's coverage of that year's election night coverage.

He covered the 1959 All-Ireland Senior Hurling Championship Final between Kilkenny and Waterford for BBC Television, an experience which moved him to describe hurling as his second-favourite sport in the world after his first love, football.

In March 1954, Kenneth Wolstenholme and Barney Mulrenan co-commentated on the first football match to be broadcast on TV in Wales, South Wales Amateur Football League v the Worcestershire Football Combination from the Maindy Stadium in Cardiff.

Wolstenholme commentated on many English domestic football games of the 1950s and 1960s, including the first ever game featured on Match of the Day in 1964. He covered the FA Cup final in 1951 and then every year from 1953 to 1971, the year of Arsenal's "double". For the BBC he commentated on the 1960 European Cup Final between Real Madrid and Eintracht Frankfurt at Hampden Park, widely regarded as one of the greatest football matches ever played. Real won the match 7–3 before a record European Cup Final crowd of 127,000, all their goals scored by Puskas and di Stefano.

=== "They think it's all over" ===
Wolstenholme's unscripted delivery in the closing moments of the 1966 FIFA World Cup Final at Wembley Stadium included fourteen words that are among the best known in British sport commentary. With England leading 3–2 against West Germany, a small pitch invasion took place during injury time just as Geoff Hurst scored to put England 4–2 ahead. The events prompted Wolstenholme to say:

Some people are on the pitch... they think it's all over... it is now!

"It is now" was added in an almost matter-of-fact way after Hurst had scored the goal. Since 1966, the phrase "they think it's all over" has become well known in modern English. Although unrehearsed, and spoken in the particular circumstances of the game, the words echoed to an extent those of German commentator Herbert Zimmermann – "It's over! Over! Over! Germany are the World Champions" – when West Germany won the 1954 World Cup against Hungary.

=== Later career ===
After the 1966 World Cup, Wolstenholme continued his broadcasting career in the UK and Europe. In 1967 he travelled to the Estádio Nacional in Lisbon to cover Celtic overcoming Internazionale in the European Cup Final. A year later, he commentated at Wembley Stadium as Manchester United defeated Benfica to take the 1968 European Cup. He was the BBC's main man at the 1970 World Cup but he almost took out an injunction when the BBC threatened to demote him in favour of David Coleman if England reached the final. Wolstenholme commentated on the final between Brazil and Italy. He left the corporation in 1971 after Coleman was installed as the BBC's top commentator, his final BBC commentary being on the 1971 European Cup Final between Ajax and Panathinaikos at Wembley Stadium.

Wolstenholme later commentated for Tyne Tees Television in the mid to late 1970s, but re-appeared on TV to provide reports and occasional features for Channel 4 when they earned rights in the early 1990s to show Serie A games from Italy, but ill health forced him to retire. He also took on an acting role, appearing in the BBC Radio 4 comedy series Lenin of the Rovers in 1988 as football commentator Frank Lee Brian. In 1990, he was a guest star on an episode of parody satellite television station KYTV on BBC2.

In 1996, The Beatles released an outtake version of "Glass Onion" on The Beatles Anthology 3 album which featured Wolstenholme's voice at the end of the track repeating, "it's a goal!"

Wolstenholme, who had been a supporter of Bolton Wanderers since childhood, was a guest of honour at the club's final game at Burnden Park in April 1997. He also narrated the club's End of an Era video which was released as part of Bolton's move from Burnden Park to the Reebok Stadium.

In 1998, Wolstenholme made a special appearance in EA Sports' videogame World Cup 98, as the sole commentator on the game's classic World Cup matches, recreations of historic World Cup finals that included sepia-toned renditions of the 1930 and 1938 editions.

== Legacy ==
His phrase was used as the title for the sports quiz programme They Think It's All Over.

The words "They think it's all over, it is now" are engraved on a flagstone in Churchgate, in Bolton town centre, alongside quotes from other celebrities from Bolton.

Bill Oddie wrote a song about Wolstenholme for the BBC Radio comedy show I'm Sorry, I'll Read That Again which includes the lines: "I'm going Wolsten-home/And you can't get Wolsten (worse than) him!" In another sketch on ISIRTA a contestant in a television quiz show was awarded Wolstenholme as a prize.

== Personal life ==
In 1944 he married his wife, Joan. She died in 1997. They had two daughters, one of whom predeceased him.

Wolstenholme lived in Galmpton, Torbay, Devon until his death.

== See also ==
- 1966 FIFA World Cup Final
- They think it's all over
