= Ash discography =

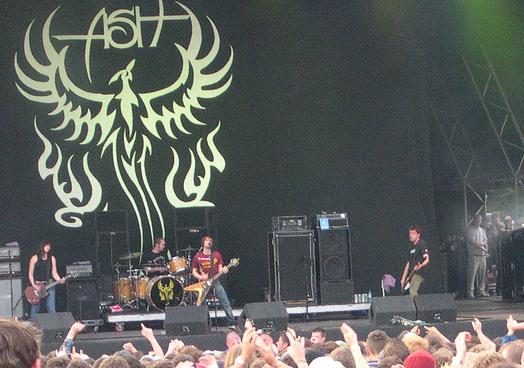
- Ash performing live in 2004
- Studio albums: 9
- Extended plays: 4
- Live albums: 4
- Compilation albums: 5
- Singles: 72
- Music videos: 51

The discography of Ash, a Northern Irish alternative rock band, consists of nine studio albums, three live albums, five compilation albums, one EP and sixty-nine singles.

== Albums ==
=== Studio albums ===
Title	Album details	Peak chart positions													Certifications (sales thresholds)
Title	Album details	UK	AUS	AUT	FIN	FRA	GER	IRE	NL	NOR	NZ	SWE	SWI	US Heat.	Certifications (sales thresholds)
1977	Released: 6 May 1996; Label: Infectious, Home Grown; Formats: Cassette, CD, LP	1	18	—	26	—	65	—	75	26	14	44	40	—	BPI: Platinum
Nu-Clear Sounds	Released: 5 October 1998; Label: Infectious, Home Grown; Formats: Cassette, CD, LP, MD	7	44	—	—	—	86	—	—	37	—	—	—	—	BPI: Gold
Free All Angels	Released: 23 April 2001; Label: Infectious, Home Grown; Formats: Cassette, CD, 2CD, CD+DVD-V, LP, MD	1	43	28	—	121	34	2	—	20	32	58	—	11	BPI: Platinum
Meltdown	Released: 17 May 2004; Label: Infectious, Home Grown; Formats: CD, 2CD, CD+DVD-V, digital download, LP	5	87	78	—	—	65	6	—	25	—	—	—	—	BPI: Gold
Twilight of the Innocents	Released: 2 July 2007; Label: Infectious; Formats: CD, 2CD, digital download, LP	32	—	—	—	—	—	26	—	—	—	—	—	—	
Kablammo!	Released: 25 May 2015; Label: earMUSIC; Formats: CD, digital download, LP	41	—	—	—	—	—	27	—	—	—	—	—	—	
Islands	Released: 18 May 2018; Label: Infectious; Formats: Cassette, CD, digital download, LP	18	—	—	—	—	—	34	—	—	—	—	—	—	
Race the Night	Released: 15 September 2023; Label: Fierce Panda; Formats: Cassette, CD, digital download, LP	14	—	—	—	—	—	60	—	—	—	—	—	—	
Ad Astra	Released: 3 October 2025; Label: Fierce Panda; Formats: Cassette, CD, digital download, LP	15	—	—	—	—	—	—	—	—	—	—	—	—	
"—" denotes releases that failed to chart or was not released

=== Mini-albums ===
Title	Album details	Peak chart positions
Title	Album details	UK
Trailer	Released: 24 October 1994; Label: Infectious; Formats: Cassette, CD, LP	143

=== Live albums ===
Title	Album details	Peak chart positions	
Title	Album details	UK	NOR
Live at the Wireless	Released: 24 February 1997; Label: Deathstar; Formats: CD, cassette, LP	85	—
Tokyo Blitz	Released: December 2001; Label: Infectious, Home Grown; Formats: DVD	—	—
Live on Mars: London Astoria 1997	Released: 2 December 2016; Label: Earmusic; Formats: CD, 2×LP	—	—
BBC Sessions 1994 - 1999	Released: 17 July 2021; Label: Atomic Heart Records; Formats: Cassette, LP	—	—

=== Compilation albums ===
Title	Album details	Peak chart positions			Certifications
Title	Album details	UK	IRE	NOR	Certifications
Intergalactic Sonic 7″s	Released: 9 September 2002; Label: Infectious; Formats: CD, cassette, LP	3	4	18	BPI: Gold
A–Z Vol.1	Released: 19 April 2010; Label: Atomic Heart; Formats: CD, CD+DVD-V	68	83	—	
A–Z Vol.2	Released: 25 October 2010; Label: Atomic Heart; Formats: CD	130	—	—	
The Best of Ash	Released: 3 October 2011; Label: Rhino; Formats: CD/DVD	132	—	—	
Teenage Wildlife: 25 Years of Ash	Released: 14 February 2020; Label: BMG, Echo; Formats: CD, LP	26	14	—	
"—" denotes releases that failed to chart or was not released

== EPs ==
Title	EP details
Little Infinity EP	Released: June 2012; Label: Atomic Heart, Noyes; Formats: Digital download, 12" vinyl

== Singles ==
Year	Single	Peak chart positions							Certifications	Album
Year	Single	UK	UK Indie	UK Rock	AUS	IRE	NZ	SCO	Certifications	Album
1994	"Jack Names the Planets"	—	—	—	—	—	—	—		Trailer
1994	"Petrol"	96	—	—	—	—	—	—		Trailer
1994	"Uncle Pat"	101	—	2	—	20	—	—		Trailer
1995	"Kung Fu"	57	—	—	—	—	—	58		1977
1995	"Girl from Mars"	11	—	—	86	16	—	14	BPI: Gold	1977
1995	"Angel Interceptor"	14	—	—	—	13	—	15		1977
1996	"Goldfinger"	5	—	—	50	8	26	8		1977
1996	"Oh Yeah"	6	—	—	80	14	—	5		1977
1997	"A Life Less Ordinary"	10	2	—	88	16	—	12		A Life Less Ordinary Soundtrack
1998	"Jesus Says"	15	2	—	—	9	—	13		Nu-Clear Sounds
1998	"Wildsurf"	31	8	—	—	7	—	34		Nu-Clear Sounds
1999	"Numbskull"	^{a}	—	—	—	8	—	—		Nu-Clear Sounds
2001	"Shining Light"	8	1	—	69	23	—	7		Free All Angels
2001	"Burn Baby Burn"	13	1	—	—	20	—	10		Free All Angels
2001	"Sometimes"	21	3	—	—	41	—	16		Free All Angels
2001	"Candy"	20	5	—	—	25	—	20		Free All Angels
2001	"There's a Star"	13	3	—	—	38	—	21		Free All Angels
2002	"Walking Barefoot"^{[A]}	—	—	—	—	—	—	—		Free All Angels
2002	"Envy"	21	3	—	—	7	—	20		Intergalactic Sonic 7″s
2002	"Jack Names the Planets"	82	18	—	—	12	—	89		Intergalactic Sonic 7″s
2004	"Clones"	^{b}	—	—	—	12	—	—		Meltdown
2004	"Orpheus"	13	—	—	—	17	—	16		Meltdown
2004	"Starcrossed"	22	—	—	—	19	—	21		Meltdown
2004	"Renegade Cavalcade"	33	—	—	—	22	—	34		Meltdown
2007	"You Can't Have It All"	16	—	—	—	—	—	12		Twilight of the Innocents
2007	"Polaris"	32	—	—	—	—	—	14		Twilight of the Innocents
2007	"End of the World"	62	—	—	—	—	—	23		Twilight of the Innocents
2009	"Return of White Rabbit"	^{c}	—	—	—	—	—	—		A–Z Series
2009	"True Love 1980"	148	12	—	—	88	—	—		A–Z Series
2009	"Joy Kicks Darkness"	171	16	—	—	—	—	—		A–Z Series
2009	"Arcadia"	114	13	—	—	—	—	—		A–Z Series
2009	"Tracers"	140	8	—	—	—	—	—		A–Z Series
2009	"The Dead Disciples"	139	11	—	—	—	—	—		A–Z Series
2009	"Pripyat"	165	17	—	—	—	—	—		A–Z Series
2010	"Ichiban"	176	18	—	—	—	—	—		A–Z Series
2010	"Space Shot"	129	16	—	—	—	—	—		A–Z Series
2010	"Neon"	120	11	—	—	—	—	—		A–Z Series
2010	"Command"	131	12	—	—	—	—	—		A–Z Series
2010	"Song of Your Desire"	104	6	—	—	—	—	—		A–Z Series
2010	"Dionysian Urge"	106	8	—	—	—	—	—		A–Z Series
2010	"War with Me"	114	8	—	—	—	—	—		A–Z Series
2010	"Dare to Dream"	87	8	—	—	—	—	—		A–Z Series
2010	"Mind Control"	101	5	—	—	—	—	—		A–Z Series
2010	"Insects"	99	8	—	—	—	—	—		A–Z Series
2010	"Binary"	103	7	—	—	—	—	—		A–Z Series
2010	"Physical World"	96	7	—	—	—	—	—		A–Z Series
2010	"Spheres"	91	9	—	—	—	—	—		A–Z Series
2010	"Instinct"	65	5	—	—	—	—	—		A–Z Series
2010	"Summer Snow"	91	7	—	—	—	—	—		A–Z Series
2010	"Carnal Love"	78	5	—	—	—	—	—		A–Z Series
2010	"Embers"	79	7	—	—	—	—	—		A–Z Series
2010	"Change Your Name"	84	10	1	—	—	—	—		A–Z Series
2010	"Sky Burial"	87	14	2	—	—	—	—		A–Z Series
2010	"There Is Hope Again"	92	14	—	—	—	—	—		A–Z Series
2015	"Cocoon"	—	—	—	—	—	—	—		Kablammo!
2015	"Free"	—	—	—	—	—	—	—		Kablammo!
2015	"Machinery"	—	—	—	—	—	—	—		Kablammo!
2018	"Buzzkill"	—	—	—	—	—	—	—		Islands
2018	"Annabel"	—	—	—	—	—	—	—		Islands
2018	"Confessions in the Pool"	—	—	—	—	—	—	—		Islands
2023	"Race the Night"	—	—	—	—	—	—	—		Race the Night
2023	"Like a God"	—	—	—	—	—	—	—		Race the Night
2023	"Usual Places"	—	—	—	—	—	—	—		Race the Night
2023	"Crashed Out Wasted"	—	—	—	—	—	—	—		Race the Night
2023	"Oh Yeah (Teenage Years)"	—	—	—	—	—	—	—		Non-album Single
2025	"Jump in the Line"	—	—	—	—	—	—	—		Ad Astra
2025	"Give Me Back My World"	—	—	—	—	—	—	—		Ad Astra
2025	"Which One Do You Want?"	—	—	—	—	—	—	—		Ad Astra
2025	"Fun People"	—	—	—	—	—	—	—		Ad Astra
2025	"Santa Claus Is Coming To Town"	—	—	—	—	—	—	—		Non-album Single
2026	"Keep Dreaming"	—	—	—	—	—	—	—		Ad Astra
2026	"Bittersweet Blue"	—	—	—	—	—	—	—		1977 (30th Anniversary Edition)
"—" denotes a recording that did not chart or was not released in that territory.

- A Australia-only release.

^{a} Ineligible for singles chart due to number of tracks
^{b} Downloads chart exclusive. Reached number 1.
^{c} Free download from ashofficial.com

== Music videos ==
Year	Title	Director	Album
1994	"Jack Names the Planets"	Phil Harder	Trailer
1994	"Petrol"		Trailer
1994	"Uncle Pat"		Trailer
1995	"Kung Fu"	Steven Wells and Nick Small	1977
1995	"Girl from Mars" (UK version)	Peter Christopherson	1977
1995	"Girl from Mars" (US version)	Jesse Peretz	1977
1995	"Angel Interceptor"	Ash	1977
1996	"Goldfinger"	Mike Brady	1977
1996	"Oh Yeah"	Julian Barton	1977
1997	"A Life Less Ordinary"	Hammer & Tongs	A Life Less Ordinary Soundtrack
1998	"Jesus Says"	Howard Greenhalgh	Nu-Clear Sounds
1998	"Wildsurf"	Howard Greenhalgh	Nu-Clear Sounds
1999	"Numbskull"	Darran Tiernan	Nu-Clear Sounds
2001	"Shining Light"		Free All Angels
2001	"Warmer Than Fire"	Darren Tiernan	"Shining Light" B-side
2001	"Burn Baby Burn"	Jeff Thomas	Free All Angels
2001	"Sometimes"	Jeff Thomas	Free All Angels
2001	"Candy"	Jeff Thomas	Free All Angels
2001	"There's a Star"	Jeff Thomas	Free All Angels
2002	"Envy"	Piper Ferguson	Intergalactic Sonic 7″s
2004	"Clones" (Version 1)	Jeff Thomas	Meltdown
2004	"Clones" (Version 2)	Jeff Thomas	Meltdown
2004	"Orpheus"	Jeff Thomas	Meltdown
2004	"Starcrossed"	Jeff Thomas	Meltdown
2004	"Renegade Cavalcade"		Meltdown
2007	"I Started a Fire"	Josh Kletzkin	Twilight of the Innocents
2007	"You Can't Have It All"	Jeff Thomas	Twilight of the Innocents
2007	"Polaris"	Jeff Thomas	Twilight of the Innocents
2007	"End of the World"		Twilight of the Innocents
2009	"Return of the White Rabbit" (Version 1)	Nico Jones	A–Z Series
2009	"Return of the White Rabbit" (Version 2)	Karen Lord	A–Z Series
2009	"Return of the White Rabbit" (Version 3)		A–Z Series
2009	"True Love 1980"	Daniel Garcia	A–Z Series
2009	"Joy Kicks Darkness"	Josh Kletzkin	A–Z Series
2009	"Arcadia"	Josh Kletzkin	A–Z Series
2009	"Tracers"	Josh Kletzkin	A–Z Series
2009	"The Dead Disciples"	Fan Made	A–Z Series
2009	"Pripyat"		A–Z Series
2010	"Ichiban"		A–Z Series
2010	"Spaceshot"	Daniel Garcia	A–Z Series
2010	"Neon"	KINo	A–Z Series
2010	"War with Me"	Alex Beck	A–Z Series
2010	"Binary"	Nico Jones	A–Z Series
2015	"Free"	Mat Whitecross	Kablammo!
2015	"Machinery"		Kablammo!
2015	"Cocoon"	Eric Feigenbaum	Kablammo!
2018	"Annabel"	Luc Janin	Islands
2018	"Confessions in the Pool"	Dylan Holmes Williams	Islands
2023	"Race the Night"	Jed Shepherd	Race the Night
2023	"Like a God"		Race the Night
2023	"Usual Places"	Niall Trask	Race the Night
2025	"Jump in the Line"	Anthony Neale	Ad Astra
2025	"Give Me Back My World"	Anthony Neale	Ad Astra
2025	"Santa Claus Is Coming to Town"	Alexander Marx	
2026	"Keep Dreaming"	Anthony Neale	Ad Astra
2026	"Bittersweet Blue"		1977 (30th Anniversary Edition)
