= The Best of Ash =

Greatest hits album by Ash
- Released: 17 October 2011
- Recorded: 1996–2011
- Genre: Alternative rock, Britpop, indie rock, punk rock

Ash chronology
A–Z Series (2009-2010)	The Best of Ash (2011)	Kablammo! (2015)

The Best of Ash is the second greatest hits album by the band Ash, released on 17 October 2011.

The CD/DVD edition of the album includes the Teenage Wildlife documentary of Ash's 1977 tour, which is narrated by Ewan McGregor, as well as 17 of the band's music videos.

== Track listing ==
1. "Girl from Mars"
2. "Kung Fu"
3. "Angel Interceptor"
4. "Goldfinger"
5. "Oh Yeah"
6. "A Life Less Ordinary"
7. "Wild Surf"
8. "Shining Light"
9. "Burn Baby Burn"
10. "Walking Barefoot"
11. "Sometimes"
12. "Clones"
13. "Orpheus"
14. "Starcrossed"
15. "You Can"t Have It All"
16. "Twilight of the Innocents"
17. "Return of White Rabbit"
18. "Arcadia"
19. "Jack Names the Planets" (2011 re-recording)

=== Sources for songs ===
- Tracks 1–5 are from 1977, released in 1996
- Track 6 is from the soundtrack to A Life Less Ordinary, released in 1997
- Track 7 is from Nu-Clear Sounds, released in 1998
- Tracks 8–11 are from Free All Angels, released in 2001
- Tracks 12–14 are from Meltdown, released in 2004
- Tracks 15–16 are from Twilight of the Innocents, released in 2007
- Tracks 17–18 are from the A-Z Series, released in 2009
- Track 19 is a re-recording of a track from Trailer, originally released in 1994
