= Candy (Ash song) =

2001 song by Ash

Single by Ash

from the album Free All Angels
- B-side: "Waterfall", "Nocturne", "Stay In Love Forever", "The Sweetness of Death by the Obsidian Knife"
- Released: 1 October 2001
- Genre: Alternative rock, pop rock
- Length: 4:51
- Label: Infectious
- Songwriters: Burt Bacharach, Hal David, Tim Wheeler
- Producer: Owen Morris

Ash singles chronology
"Sometimes" (2001)	"Candy" (2001)	"There's a Star" (2001)

"Candy" is a song by Ash, released as the fourth single from their album Free All Angels on 1 October 2001. It was released as a single CD (released on 2CD formats, the first of which being an enhanced CD) as a 7-inch vinyl (which was limited edition and came with a numbered picture gatefold sleeve), as well as on DVD format. Candy performed only slightly better than previous single "Sometimes", reaching number 20 on the UK Singles Chart and number 25 in Ireland.

"Candy" sees Ash experiment with new territory in an emotion filled track. It samples The Walker Brothers track "Make It Easy On Yourself". Wheeler has said about the sample: "It's on a song called 'Candy' that we rewrote about four times 'Cos we couldn't get it right. We tried some samples and that fitted perfectly. It lifted the song up and we danced around the studio for two days seriously drunk".

The sample on "Candy" is one of the reasons "Free All Angels" was delayed, due to legal issues. Mark Hamilton claims "Candy" is his favourite track on the album.

Although the song featured in the band's set lists early on in the "Free All Angels" tour, it was quickly dropped and rarely performed since (one of those occasions being the "Tokyo Blitz" DVD. The song can also be found on the "Intergalactic Sonic 7″s" hits collection.

Candy also appears on the b-side of Ash's rare 2003 "I'm On Drugs" EP. The song is covered by the death metal band Ten Masked Men, who won an XFM competition to appear on the EP.

== B-Sides ==
The first b-side on CD1 is "Waterfall". "Waterfall" is one of Ash's earliest recorded songs, and appears on the "Shed" and "Pipe Smokin' Brick" demo tapes, as well as in Ash's early set lists. The track was re-recorded for re-release on the single.

"Nocturne" is a gentle love song written by Hamilton and Wheeler as the second b-side on the CD1 version of the single. It also appeared on the "Cosmic Debris" b-sides collection in 2002.

Continuing the single's theme with slow-paced, love song b-sides, "Stay In Love Forever" appears as the first b-side on the CD2 addition of the single. This song also appears on the "Cosmic Debris" collection due to its apparent fan popularity.

Finally, "The Sweetness of Death by the Obsidian Knife" appears on CD2 of "Candy". Similarly to the title track, it uses a full orchestra for the song. The song is split into two parts, the first being a quite fast-paced acoustic track, and the second being a slow lament with a backing orchestra. It can also be found on the "Cosmic Debris" disc.

The band wrote and recorded a French language version of the song for inclusion on some European releases.

== Music video ==
The video for "Candy" is extremely tongue in cheek, and stars "cameos" from various celebrities such as Michael Jackson, Robert De Niro and George Michael. Similar to the film "The Wedding Singer", the video is set at a glitzy wedding reception, and stars the band (in suits) playing at the reception. It also stars Tim Wheeler's attempts to seduce the clumsy waitress (presumably the Candy of the song) via some pyrotechnics by the band. It was directed by Jeff Thomas in the Elstree Studios, near London.

"Candy" was also released as a DVD. The DVD featured the single, a stills gallery, lyrics and an Ash discography. It also starred Ash's second 20-minute short, "Episode 3: We're Sorry, Miss Jackson".

The CD2 version of the CD contained Version 1.2 of the "Ash Video Mixer" software.

== Track listing ==
All tracks written and composed by Tim Wheeler; except where indicated.

CD one (Enhanced)

1. "Candy (Remix)"
2. "Waterfall"
3. "Nocturne" (Hamilton/Wheeler)
4. "Candy (Video)"

CD two

1. "Candy (Album Version)"
2. "Stay In Love Forever"
3. "The Sweetness of Death by the Obsidian Knife"

DVD

1. "Candy" (DVD Audio)
2. Episode 3: We're Sorry, Miss. Jackson
3. Stills Gallery
4. Discography
5. Lyrics

7-inch

1. "Candy (Remix)"
2. "Waterfall"
3. "Nocturne" (Hamilton/Wheeler)
4. "Stay In Love Forever"

Promo CD

1. "Candy (Remix)"
2. "Candy (Radio Edit)"

Maxi-single

1. Candy (French Version)
2. Candy (Album Version)
3. Jesus Says (Hedrock Valley Beats Lightyear 12-inch Mix)
4. 13th Floor

== Charts ==
Chart (2001)	Peak position
Europe (Eurochart Hot 100)	76
Ireland (IRMA)	25
Scotland (OCC)	20
UK Singles (OCC)	20
UK Indie (OCC)	5
