= Intergalactic Sonic 7″s =

Compilation album by Ash
- Released: 9 September 2002
- Genre: Alternative rock, Britpop, pop punk
- Length: 137:48
- Label: Infectious
- Producer: Ash, Arthur Baker, Phil Thornalley, Dave Eringa, Chris Kimsey, Owen Morris, Rae Valentine, Marc Waterman, Rafe McKenna

Ash chronology
Free All Angels (2001)	Intergalactic Sonic 7″s (2002)	Meltdown (2004)

Professional ratings
Review scores
Source	Rating
Allmusic	4.5/5 stars
Drowned in Sound	9/10
The Guardian	4/5 stars
NME	9/10
Stylus	10/10

Intergalactic Sonic 7″s is a singles collection, released by punk-influenced band Ash on 9 September 2002. It is available in two formats, with and without the bonus disc, Cosmic Debris. These are both available on CD and vinyl. It was released to celebrate Ash's tenth anniversary and collected the band's eighteen singles along with "Envy" a new song recorded specifically for the compilation. The American mixes of "Burn Baby Burn" "Jesus Says" and "Wildsurf" are included instead of their original mixes and a shorter edit of "Shining Light is included in place of the version featured on Free All Angels.

It peaked at number three in the UK album charts.

The album features artwork by comic artist Pat Lee.

It was also certified Gold by the BPI on October 4, 2002.

== Track listing ==
All tracks written by Tim Wheeler except where noted.

=== Main release ===
1. "Burn Baby Burn" (from Free All Angels) – 3:28
2. "Envy" (26 August 2002) – 3:35
3. "Girl From Mars" (from 1977) – 3:29
4. "Shining Light" (from Free All Angels) – 4:22
5. "A Life Less Ordinary" – 4:15
6. "Goldfinger" (from 1977) – 4:33
7. "Jesus Says" (Hamilton/Wheeler) (from Nu-Clear Sounds) – 4:44
8. "Oh Yeah" (from 1977) – 4:47
9. "Jack Names the Planets" (from Trailer) – 3:12
10. "Sometimes" (from Free All Angels) – 4:09
11. "Kung Fu" (from 1977) – 2:18
12. "Candy" (from Free All Angels) – 4:51
13. "Angel Interceptor" (McMurray/Wheeler) (from 1977) – 4:08
14. "Uncle Pat" (from Trailer) – 3:13
15. "Wildsurf" (23 November 1998) (Hatherley/Wheeler) (from Nu-Clear Sounds) – 3:29
16. "Walking Barefoot" (from Free All Angels) – 4:14
17. "Petrol" (Hamilton/Wheeler) (from Trailer) – 4:11
18. "There's a Star" (from Free All Angels) – 4:22
19. "Numbskull" (Hamilton/Wheeler) (from Nu-Clear Sounds) – 3:10
20. "Get Out" (Japanese release bonus track) (Hamilton/Wheeler) (from Trailer) – 1:29
21. "Cherry Bomb" (Japanese release bonus track) (from Free All Angels) – 3:17

=== Cosmic Debris ===
This bonus disc features 22 (23 in Japan) B-sides and rarities voted for by fans on an online poll.

1. "No Place to Hide" (from "There's a Star") – 3:36
2. "Warmer Than Fire" (Ludwin) (from "Shining Light") – 3:07
3. "Where Is Our Love Going?" (from "A Life Less Ordinary") – 3:26
4. "Taken Out" (Hatherley) (from "Jesus Says") – 2:53
5. "13th Floor" (from "Burn Baby Burn") – 3:03
6. "Stormy Waters" (McMurray) (from "Wildsurf") – 4:42
7. "Message from Oscar Wilde and Patrick the Brewer" (a new reprise of a fan skit from "Petrol") – 0:30
8. "Who You Drivin' Now?" (Lukin/McLaughlin/Peters/Turner) (Mudhoney cover, from "Numbskull") – 2:02
9. "Stay in Love Forever" (from "Candy") – 3:41
10. "The Sweetness of Death by the Obsidian Knife" (from "Candy") – 3:29
11. "Melon Farmer" (Lowe/Peak) (from "Sometimes") – 2:01
12. "Nocturne" (from "Candy") – 3:31
13. "Gabriel" (Hamilton/Wheeler) (from "Shining Light") – 5:28
14. "Coasting" (from "There's a Star") – 3:30
15. "Lose Control" (Lowe/Peak) (from "Wildsurf") – 2:14
16. "I Need Somebody" (Hamilton) (from "Goldfinger") – 2:37
17. "Sneaker" (Hamilton/Peak) (from "Goldfinger") – 3:15
18. "Cantina Band" (John Williams) (from "Girl From Mars") – 2:54
19. "Astral Conversations with Toulouse Lautrec" (Hamilton/McMurray/Wheeler) (from "Girl From Mars") – 6:05
20. "Day of the Triffids" (from "Kung Fu") – 3:34
21. "Halloween" (from "A Life Less Ordinary") – 3:30
22. "Thinking About You" (from "Burn Baby Burn") – 3:50
23. "Bad Karma Blues" (Japanese release bonus track) (from "Envy")

== Personnel ==
- Arthur Baker – producer
- Phil Thornalley – producer
- Dave Eringa – producer
- Chris Kimsey – producer
- Owen Morris – producer, mixing
- Alan Moulder – mixing
- Rae Valentine – producer
- Butch Vig – mixing
- Ash – producer, engineer, mixing
- Marc Waterman – producer
- Miti – producer, mixing
- Pat Lee – artwork
- Rafe McKenna – producer, engineer
- Mark Trombino – mixing
- Mike Walter – engineer
- Nick Fountain – assistant
- Sophie Howarth – photography
- James Brown – engineer
- Nick Brine – engineer, assistant engineer, mixing
- Ian Laughton – engineer
