= There's a Star =

2001 single by Ash

Single by Ash

from the album Free All Angels
- B-side: "No Place to Hide", "Coasting", "Here Comes the Music", "Grey Will Fade"
- Released: 31 December 2001
- Length: 4:20
- Label: Infectious
- Songwriter: Tim Wheeler
- Producer: Owen Morris

Ash singles chronology
"Candy" (2001)	"There's a Star" (2001)	"Walking Barefoot" (2002)

Alternative cover
- CD 2 cover

"There's a Star" is a song by Ash, released as the fifth single from their album Free All Angels, on 31 December 2001. It was released as a single CD (released on two CD formats, the first of which being an enhanced CD) as a 7-inch vinyl record and on DVD. "There's a Star" was a surprise hit for the band, reaching number 13 on the UK Singles Chart and giving them one of their best-selling singles, even though the single was deleted after one week. The song also reached number 38 in Ireland.

The track was originally written for "Nu-Clear Sounds" like "Burn Baby Burn", but did not make the cut. The track was slightly re-written for "Free All Angels", and was always intentioned for a Christmas release.

The track is very rarely performed live, and can also be found on the Intergalactic Sonic 7″s greatest hits collection.

== B-Sides ==
"No Place to Hide" is the first B-side on CD 1, as well as the first track on B-side collection "Cosmic Debris". It's widely regarded as Ash's favourite B-side, and is Mark Hamilton's favourite. The song was written while Ash were in the Far East shortly after the September 11 attacks and it reflects the prevailing atmosphere at the time. The song has been performed live on several occasions.

"Coasting" is one of Ash's oldest tracks and appears on the "Garage Girl" demo tape. It was also re-recorded as part of BBC music session in 1995, but was never released because the band disliked their performance. Due to fan demand, the band finally re-recorded the song for release on the "There's a Star" single. The newer recording was pretty much the same, but had better production values and slightly altered lyrics. The song was often performed on pre-"1977" gigs. It also appears on "Cosmic Debris", and the US version of "Free All Angels".

The first CD 2 B-side, "Here Comes the Music" continues Ash's tradition of covering little-known songs by their friends' bands. "Here Comes the Music" was originally performed by "Fixed Stars" and written by Mark Cullen.

Lastly, "Grey Will Fade" on CD 2 was written by Charlotte Hatherley, and she plays every instrument on the delicate track, with the exception of Rick McMurray's drumming. The song was highly praised on its release, and especially praised by Tim Wheeler himself. Wheeler encouraged Hatherley to record her own solo vehicle after the success of this track. She did so, and the song appears on the album, also called "Grey Will Fade". After the successes of her new solo album, Hatherley left the band in 2006.

== Music video ==
The video for "There's a Star" was again directed by Jeff Thomas. It stars the band on top of a snow-covered mountain, and Wheeler desperately searching for his beloved "Flying V" guitar. Eventually he find it just time for the guitar solo in the middle of the song, and returns to his band to play the final chorus of the song, although this time at night. It was meant to be snowing to the video, but sadly it was not to be.

There was originally meant to be more to the video, but it didn't work out. Mark explained the original plan: "We're off to Iceland to shoot it up in the mountains, imagine vast area covered in snow, think Hoth in The Empire Strikes Back, we're all dressed Han Solo style with Rebel Alliance logos with rescue flares going up in the night and we're gonna comes across 'Snow Jawas'. Whilst Tim makes a quest across the snow scape searching for his "Flying V" just in time for the solo. How epic".

"There's a Star" was also released as a DVD. The DVD featured the single, a stills gallery, lyrics and an Ash discography. It also starred Ash's fourth and final 20-minute short, "Episode 4: Ash Go Global".

The CD 2 version of the CD contained Version 1.3 of the "Ash Video Mixer" software.

== Track listing ==
CD1

1. "There's a Star (Radio Edit)" (Wheeler)
2. "No Place to Hide" (Wheeler)
3. "Coasting" (Wheeler)
4. "There's a Star (Video)"

CD2

1. "There's a Star (Album Version)" (Wheeler)
2. "Here Comes the Music" (Cullen)
3. "Grey Will Fade" (Hatherley)

DVD

1. "There's a Star (DVD Audio)" (Wheeler)
2. Episode 4: Ash Go Global
3. Stills Gallery
4. Discography
5. Lyrics

7-inch vinyl

1. "There's a Star (Radio Edit)" (Wheeler)
2. "No Place to Hide" (Wheeler)
3. "Here Comes the Music" (Cullen)
4. "Coasting" (Wheeler)

== Charts ==
Chart (2002)	Peak position
Europe (Eurochart Hot 100)	75
Ireland (IRMA)	38
Scotland Singles (OCC)	21
UK Singles (OCC)	13
UK Indie (OCC)	3
