= Free All Angels =

2001 studio album by Ash

Studio album by Ash
- Released: 23 April 2001
- Recorded: September–October 2000
- Studios: El Cortijo, Puerto Banús, Spain; The Wool Hall, Beckington; RAK, London
- Genres: Pop-punk; power pop; punk rock
- Length: 48:29
- Labels: Infectious, Home Grown
- Producers: Owen Morris, Ash

Ash chronology
Nu-Clear Sounds (1998)	Free All Angels (2001)	Intergalactic Sonic 7″s (2002)

Singles from Free All Angels
- 1. "Shining Light" Released: 29 January 2001; 2. "Burn Baby Burn" Released: 2 April 2001; 3. "Sometimes" Released: 9 July 2001; 4. "Candy" Released: 1 October 2001; 5. "There's a Star" Released: 31 December 2001; 6. "Walking Barefoot" Released: 2002

Free All Angels is the third studio album to be recorded by Northern Irish rock band Ash. It was released on 23 April 2001 through Infectious Records and Home Grown. Due to the mixed reaction to the band's second studio album Nu-Clear Sounds (1998), frontman Tim Wheeler suffered from depression. He went to his parents' house in Northern Ireland to write material for the band's next album. Free All Angels was co-produced by the band and Owen Morris, and recording sessions were held at El Cortijo in Puerto Banús, Spain, then moved to The Wool Hall in Beckington and RAK Studios in London. The album was described as pop punk, power pop and punk rock, and drew comparisons to the works of China Drum, Compulsion, Hüsker Dü, and the Replacements.

Following a three-month United Kingdom tour in late 2000, "Shining Light" was released as the album's lead single in January 2001. The second single "Burn Baby Burn" followed in April, before the album's release. Ash performed concert tours of the UK and Europe, after which "Sometimes" was released as the third single in July. The album's fourth single "Candy" was released in October, and was followed by tours of the United States, Japan, Australia, and the UK. "There's a Star" and "Walking Barefoot" were released as the final two singles, in late 2001 and 2002, respectively. Further tours of Europe and the US were performed later in 2002, alongside appearances at the Reading and Leeds Festivals.

Free All Angels received generally positive reviews from music critics, some of whom commented on Wheeler's guitarwork. The album peaked at number one in the UK and at number two in Ireland, and also reached the top 40 in Austria, Germany, New Zealand, and Norway. Free All Angels was certified platinum in the UK. All of the album's singles charted in the UK and Ireland, and "Shining Light" reached the UK top 10. Q and Under the Radar included the album on its lists of the best releases of 2001. "Shining Light" won an Ivor Novello Award for songwriting and "Burn Baby Burn" was named NME Single of the Year.

== Background and writing ==
Guitarist Charlotte Hatherley joined Ash after doing some soundtrack work with "A Life Less Ordinary" for the 1997 movie of the same name. The band then released their second studio album Nu-Clear Sounds (1998); its heavy guitarwork received mixed reviews from music critics. Its United States release came nearly a year after its initial UK release, causing the band to pause plans for their next album and to tour Nu-Clear Sounds in the US instead. The A&R person at their American label DreamWorks Records left his position and the band's US tour was shortened to three shows. Frontman Tim Wheeler fell into a state of depression, which lasted for 18 months. He yearned to return to the pop writing style to the band's debut studio album 1977 (1996) for their next album because he felt they had not leaned towards it enough with Nu-Clear Sounds.

To avoid writer's block, which had plagued the production of Nu-Clear Sounds, Wheeler moved back to his parents' house in Northern Ireland. He got into the practice of writing a song each day, saying the constant writing freed him from the pressure of needing every song he wrote to be "a 'great' song or a hit". Wheeler was listening to The Beach Boys, Weezer, Van Morrison, Leonard Cohen, and Bob Dylan, and wrote for around six months. By January 2000, drummer Rick McMurray said the band had 14 new songs. Hatherley said Wheeler wrote more completed songs, though some were co-written with bassist Mark Hamilton, in contrast to some songs on Nu-Clear Sounds which were worked on in the studio. At the end of that month, Ash played three new songs during a special show for the NME; two months later, the band debuted almost 20 new tracks, included two on which Hatherley sang lead vocals. The band appeared at The Lost Weekend festival in July and began rehearsal sessions in the following months.

== Production ==
Ash met up and rehearsed material from a selection of 50 songs at Fortress Studios in London. The band had spent most of the money they earned from 1977 on a documentary and were £1,000 away from bankruptcy. They had demoed 30 tracks; their label Infectious Records did not support the band's song choices and considered "Shining Light" would not be a hit. Recording sessions were held at El Cortijo in Puerto Banús, Spain, before moving to The Wool Hall in Beckington, and RAK Studios in London; the band self-funded the sessions, which were done entirely using Pro Tools software, in contrast to Nu-Clear Sounds, which was recorded using both Pro Tools and tape.

According to Wheeler, some of the recorded performances sounded "a little bit rigid" because the band were "testing the editing powers of Pro Tools a bit too much". According to the band, producer Owen Morris spent more time editing the drums on a computer than the band had spent recording the album. Morris and the band co-produced the album; they were assisted by Raj Das, James Brown Geronimo, and Naughty Laughty. "World Domination" was the last track to be recorded; it was recorded live in the studio; according to Morris, "We should have done the whole record live!". Recording was done in September and October 2000; the album was mixed by Alan Moulder and was mastered by Mike Marsh.

== Composition and lyrics ==
The music of Free All Angels has been described as pop punk, punk rock and power pop, drawing comparisons to the works of China Drum, Compulsion, Hüsker Dü, and the Replacements. Discussing the album's title, Wheeler said Hells Angels were doing security for one of their tours; he spotted one of their members with a t-shirt that read "free all angels", alluding to members of the group being imprisoned. Wheeler wrote the music for all of the songs except for "Submission, which he co-wrote with McMurray; and "Nicole", which he co-wrote with Hamilton. Wheeler also wrote the lyrics for all of the songs except for "Submission", which was written by McMurray; "Shark", which was co-written by Hamilton and Hatherley; and "Nicole", which Wheeler co-wrote with Hamilton. Wheeler and Oli Kraus arranged strings on some of the tracks. In contrast to Nu-Clear Sounds, where Hatherley did not put much effort into her backing vocals, she took her singing on Free All Angels "a lot more seriously", later being surprised how her voice sat in the recordings.

"Walking Barefoot" apes the Undertones and is about enjoying a happy moment before it ends. Two power-pop tracks follow it; "Burn Baby Burn" is about the slow demise of a relationship and "Shining Light" has an opening guitar part that resembles that of "The Milkman of Human Kindness" (1983) by Billy Bragg. "Burn Baby Burn" was initially called "Slow Suicide" but the band's label disliked this title so the band changed it at the suggestion of their agent. The song had its origins in the Nu-Clear Sounds sessions; the chorus was reworked during the making of Free All Angels. Wheeler came up with the guitar line for "Shining Light" by playing "Fortune Teller", a track from Nu-Clear Sounds, and adding an extra part. On "Candy", Wheeler's vocals are backed by a drum machine and orchestral strings sampled from "Make It Easy on Yourself" (1965) by the Walker Brothers. The band re-wrote the song four times before they were finally satisfied with it.

"Cherry Bomb" was recorded in the style of "Girl from Mars", a track from 1977 that also originates from the Nu-Clear Sounds sessions, begins as an acoustic ballad about Wheeler's brother. Hamilton said the bass part and drum intro were an attempt to emulate Weezer's track "Tired of Sex" (1996). McMurray went to a bar with Morris and Hamilton; Morris had encouraged McMurray to contribute during the sessions, which he had not done up to that point. Feeling hungover the following morning, McMurray picked up Morris's bass and composed the music for "Submission". The song is a Black Grape-esque tribute to Sadomasochism and includes the use of bongos.

The orchestral-driven track "Someday" talks about escapism. "Pacific Palisades", which is reminiscent of the work of The Barracudas, includes references to Dennis Wilson of the Beach Boys and Sharon Tate. The song was initially planned to include samples of The Beach Boys' songs that had been edited to fit the track, with Wheeler's vocals dubbed over them but the band left out the samples when they realized they would have trouble clearing the Beach Boys' parts. Steve Ludwin of Little Hell contributed additional backing vocals to the song. "Shark" recalls the sound of Nirvana.

Wheeler wrote "Sometimes" in a hotel in Bangkok, Thailand, while on tour to promote Nu-Clear Sounds. It began as a slow, sad song but after taking a break from the song, he decided to speed it up. The track is about outside influences that interfere with a relationship. The song was originally close to the sound of the 1977 track "Goldfinger" until Morris and Moulder made it sound closer to the work of The Smiths. Wheeler sings "Nicole" from the perspective of a serial-killer. Hamilton went to the studio, saying he liked the sound of the tube trains. Morris sent Hamilton to the station with a field recorder to record the sound of the London Underground that opens the song. The mid-tempo track "There's a Star" includes a Rhodes piano that is played by Hatherley, and is followed by the closing track "World Domination", which channels the band's earlier works. Kayley Kravitz of Vanyaland said the latter was the "most fun song ever written about taking over the world".

== Release and promotion ==
Wheeler said as soon as recording wrapped up, they put Free All Angels on Napster, "and it definitely helped create awareness of [the] new songs… it is one of the best promotional devices in the world". On 18 January 2001, Ash announced their next album would be called Free All Angels and would be released that April. The album was released on 23 April 2001; the Japanese edition of it includes "Warmer Than Fire" and "Gabriel" as bonus tracks.

Free All Angels was released in the US through Kinetic Records on 25 June 2002. Kinetic president Steve Lau knew the band from their time on Reprise Records a few years prior; he liked Free All Angels and signed the band to Kinetic. The US version of the album includes the bonus track "So the Story Goes", and a DVD with live footage and music videos.

Free All Angels was reissued on CD through BMG in 2018.

=== Singles and compilations ===
"Shining Light" was made available for download through the band's website for a month from 25 December 2000 to late January 2001, and was released as the lead single on 29 January. Two CD versions were released: one with "Warmer Than Fire" and "Gabriel"; and the other with "Feel No Pain", a remix of "Jesus Says" and the music video for "Shining Light" as its B-sides. The video was filmed in north London, and features Wheeler swimming underwater towards a bright light and waking in a hospital bed with the other band members present. It was directed by Mike Valentine, and is based on films such as The Big Blue (1988) and The Abyss (1989). It premiered online through Playlouder's website on 5 February 2001.

On 17 March 2001, the music video for "Burn Baby Burn", which was filmed in a school gym in Croydon, was released. "Burn Baby Burn" was released as a single on 2 April 2001. Two versions were released on CD: one with live versions of "13th Floor" and "Only in Dreams"; and the other with "Thinking About You", a remix of "Submission" and the "Burn Baby Burn" music video as its B-sides.

"Sometimes" was released as a single on 9 July 2001. Two versions were released on CD: one with "Skullfull of Sulphur", "So the Story Goes", and the music video for "Sometimes"; and the other with a cover of "Teenage Kicks" (1978) by the Undertones and a live version of "Melon Farmer" as its B-sides. The music video for "Sometimes", which was filmed in Havana, Cuba, was released on 29 June 2001; during the shoot, the vibrations from the song being played back caused a roof to collapse, resulting in several people being taken to hospital.

The music video for "Candy" was released on 11 September 2001. The track was initially planned for release as a single on 24 September 2001, before being released on 1 October 2001. Two versions were released on CD: one with "Waterfall", "Nocturne" and the music video for "Candy"; and the other with "Stay in Love Forever" and "The Sweetness of Death by the Obsidian Knife" as its B-sides. The video album Tokyo Blitz was released in early December; it featured footage from the band's Japan tour, interviews and other video content.

"There's a Star" was released as a single on 31 December 2001. Two versions were released on CD: one with "No Place to Hide" and "Coasting", and the other with "Here Comes the Music" and "Grey Will Fade" as its B-sides. The song's music video was filmed in Iceland during a heatwave, much to the disappointment of the band, who hoped to make it look like Hoth from Star Wars (1977).

"Walking Barefoot" was released as an Australian-exclusive single in 2002, with the "Teenage Kicks" cover, "Waterfall", "Stay in Love Forever" and "Skullfull of Sulphur" as its B-sides.

"Walking Barefoot", "Shining Light", "Burn Baby Burn", "Candy", "Sometimes" and "There's a Star" were included on the band's first compilation album Intergalactic Sonic 7″s (2003). "Walking Barefoot", "Shining Light", "Burn Baby Burn", and "Sometimes" were included on their second compilation album The Best of Ash (2011). "Shining Light", "Burn Baby Burn", "Candy", "Sometimes", and "There's a Star" were released on 7" vinyl as part of '94–'04 The 7" Singles Box Set (2019). "Walking Barefoot", "Shining Light", "Burn Baby Burn", and "Sometimes" were included on the band's third compilation album Teenage Wildlife: 25 Years of Ash (2020).

=== Touring and television ===
In November and December 2000, Ash embarked on a United Kingdom tour in which they debuted several new songs. In January 2001, the band played two acoustic in-store performances. Two months later, they participated in a celebration of Belfast, Northern Ireland, culture called "Belfast: Are We Nearly There?". In April, the band played a free show as part of the television show Box Set.

Coinciding with the release of Free All Angels, Ash toured the UK until May. Later in May, the band embarked on a European tour before returning to the UK to perform at festivals including Reading and Leeds and T in the Park, and to support Stereophonics for two shows. Ash then toured the US, Japan and Australia before another UK tour in December 2001. On 31 December, the band appeared on the British television show Later... with Jools Holland, performing "Shining Light", "Burn Baby Burn" and "Sometimes".

On 5 January 2002, Ash performed "There's a Star" on the British television show CD:UK, then toured Europe in February. Coinciding with this tour, a tour edition of album with new artwork, and a second disc of B-sides, alternative versions and music videos, was released. In March, the band appeared at the French sporting event Chamjam and played several shows in the US, including an appearance at the South by Southwest festival. In May and June, the band performed at four US radio station festivals, and appeared at the Isle of Wight and Glastonbury festivals. In July, the band toured the US with Our Lady Peace before supporting Moby until August. In August, while in the US, the band were involved in a road accident that resulted in McMurray cracking his ribs. Going against his doctor's orders, McMurray played with the band at the Reading and Leeds Festivals at the end of the month. To coincide with the release of The Best of Ash in 2011, the band went on a tour in which they played Free All Angels in full.

== Critical reception ==
Professional ratings
Aggregate scores
Source	Rating
Metacritic	76/100
Review scores
Source	Rating
AllMusic	4/5 stars
Alternative Press	8/10
Blender	4/5 stars
Drowned in Sound	6/10
Entertainment Weekly	B+
The Guardian	4/5 stars
NME	8/10
Pitchfork	7.3/10
Rolling Stone	3/5 stars
Stylus Magazine	7.7/10

Free All Angels was met with generally positive reviews from music critics. At Metacritic, the album received an average score of 76 based on 11 reviews.

AllMusic reviewer Jack Rabid called Free All Angels "a happy kick, with big guitars and big attack and onrushing energy", adding Wheeler's "sunny melodies ... come to him so unequivocally that he should have to donate the excess he wrote for this LP to some public trust". The Guardian writer Betty Clarke said Ash had "rediscovered their enthusiasm" and that Wheeler had "a smile on his face". Clarke called the album "simply great. Sometimes introspective, a bit strange, but most of all fun, it's what being young is all about." In a review for NME, Mark Beaumont wrote the album's "charm .... [is] its complete lack of limitations, its rampant ecleticism, its raising of the indie sightline above the sleeves of OK Computer and Grace." John Aizlewood of Blender viewed it as "a further step forward" and said some of the songs are "as close to 1970s power-pop experts the Raspberries as they are to Nirvana". The Boston Phoenix's Tony Ware felt that the band were "always 10 times better at gloss than at grunge," as they "snap with sharp hooks and buzzing melodies" on Free All Angels.

Stylus Magazine writer Nick Southall said Free All Angels is Ash's return "to the wistfully melodic and adrenalised love-struck punk-rock that made them so great" in their early days. He also said for the first time since 1977, "Ash have achieved synergy between their sweet-as-milkshake pop" and their "full-on heavy metal and punk" influences. Pitchfork contributor Joe Tangari wrote it is a "dichotomy of ideals" that makes the album "a compelling listen, if a seemingly contradictory one at times"; and continued, it "certainly works on another level. It's a damn good pop album, with a little muscle behind its melodies to boot." Drowned in Sound founder Sean Adams said Free All Angels has "magical moments, although they seem to bookend the album". Adams also said the album is neither "brilliant" nor "crap", but is "a record with guitar pop brilliance and songs that should have been left as b-sides". In a review for Rolling Stone, David Fricke said half of the album "sinks under sluggish ballad tempos, sour strings and, in 'Submission,' unnecessary electronica" while the other half "is solid chain-saw fun, some of the best '77 you'll hear in 2002".

== Commercial performance and accolades ==
Free All Angels entered the UK Album Chart at number one, and peaked at number two in Ireland and Scotland. It reached number 11 on the US Billboard Heatseekers Albums chart, number 20 in Norway, number 28 in Austria, number 32 in New Zealand, number 34 in Germany, number 43 in Australia, number 58 in Sweden, and number 121 in France. The album was later certified platinum in the UK.

"Shining Light" charted at number 8 in the UK and at number 23 in Ireland. "Burn Baby Burn" charted at number 13 in the UK and at number 20 in Ireland. "Sometimes" charted at number 21 in the UK and at number 41 in Ireland. "Candy" charted at number 20 in the UK and at number 25 in Ireland. "There's a Star" charted at number 13 in the UK and at number 38 in Ireland.

Q and Under the Radar listed Free All Angels as one of the best albums of 2001, and Hot Press named it the Best Irish Album. "Shining Light" won an Ivor Novello Award for songwriting and "Burn Baby Burn" won NME Single of the Year, and was picked by Q as Single of the Year.

== Track listing ==
Writing credits per booklet.

No.	Title	Lyrics	Music	Length
1.	"Walking Barefoot"	Tim Wheeler	Wheeler	4:13
2.	"Shining Light"	Wheeler	Wheeler	5:09
3.	"Burn Baby Burn"	Wheeler	Wheeler	3:29
4.	"Candy"	Wheeler	Wheeler	4:52
5.	"Cherry Bomb"	Wheeler	Wheeler	3:17
6.	"Submission"	Rick McMurray; Wheeler	McMurray	3:33
7.	"Someday"	Wheeler	Wheeler	4:29
8.	"Pacific Palisades"	Wheeler	Wheeler	1:57
9.	"Shark"	Wheeler	Mark Hamilton; Charlotte Hatherley	3:18
10.	"Sometimes"	Wheeler	Wheeler	4:07
11.	"Nicole"	Hamilton; Wheeler	Hamilton; Wheeler	3:25
12.	"There's a Star"	Wheeler	Wheeler	4:20
13.	"World Domination"	Wheeler	Wheeler	2:17
Total length:				48:29

== Personnel ==
Personnel per booklet.

Ash

- Tim Wheeler – guitar, vocals, string arrangements
- Mark Hamilton – bass guitar
- Rick McMurray – drums
- Charlotte Hatherley – guitar, vocals

Additional musicians

- Oli Kraus – string arrangements
- Steve Ludwin – additional backing vocals (track 8)

Production

- Owen Morris – producer, recording
- Ash – producer
- Alan Moulder – mixing
- Raj Das – studio assistant
- James Brown Geronimo – studio assistant
- Naughty Laughty – studio assistant
- Mike Marsh – mastering
- Sophie Howarth – band photography
- Jim Fitzpatrick – illustration
- The Deceptikons – artwork

== Charts and certifications ==
=== Weekly charts ===
Chart (2001)	Peak position
Australian Albums (ARIA)	43
Austrian Albums (Ö3 Austria)	28
French Albums (SNEP)	121
German Albums (Offizielle Top 100)	34
Irish Albums (IRMA)	2
New Zealand Albums (RMNZ)	32
Norwegian Albums (VG-lista)	20
Scottish Albums (Official Charts)	2
Swedish Albums (Sverigetopplistan)	58
UK Albums (Official Charts)	1
US Heatseekers Albums (Billboard)	11

=== Year-end charts ===
Chart (2001)	Position
UK Albums (OCC)	72

=== Certifications ===
Region	Certification	Certified units/sales
United Kingdom (BPI)	Platinum	300,000^{^}
^{^} Shipments figures based on certification alone.
