= Nu-Clear Sounds =

Studio album by Ash
- Released: 5 October 1998
- Recorded: 1998
- Studios: Rockfield, Wales; Astoria, London
- Genre: Garage rock
- Length: 46:12
- Labels: Infectious, Home Grown
- Producers: Ash; Chris Kimsey; Owen Morris

Ash chronology
1977 (1996)	Nu-Clear Sounds (1998)	Free All Angels (2001)

Singles from Nu-Clear Sounds
- 1. "Jesus Says" Released: 1998; 2. "Wildsurf" Released: 1998; 3. "Numbskull" Released: 1999 (EP)

Nu-Clear Sounds is the second studio album by Northern Irish rock band Ash. It was released on 5 October 1998, through Infectious Records and Home Grown. Following the release of the band's debut studio album, 1977 (1996), guitarist Charlotte Hatherley became a member. They wrote new material at a farmhouse, before going to Wales to record their next album at Rockfield Studios. With additional sessions held at the Astoria in London, Ash produced the proceedings alongside Chris Kimsey and Owen Morris. A garage rock record, the New York Dolls, the Rolling Stones and the Velvet Underground inspired the album.

Preceded by Nu-Clear Sounds' lead single "Jesus Says" in September 1998, the band toured the United Kingdom and other parts of Europe until the end of the year. "Wildsurf" was released as the second single partway through the European segment in November. In early 1999, Ash played shows in New Zealand, Australia and Japan. Following this, they performed a handful of shows in the United States and the UK, before appearing at the Glastonbury Festival. The album was released in the US in September 1999; it featured an alternate track listing and three remixes by Butch Vig of songs. A supporting US tour was planned throughout October, however, it was cut short.

Music critics gave Nu-Clear Sounds generally positive reviews; some complimented the musicianship, while others found it inconsistent. The album peaked at number seven in the UK, alongside reaching the top 50 in Australia, Norway and Scotland. It was certified gold in the UK by the British Phonographic Industry (BPI). "Jesus Says", "Wildsurf" and "Numbskull" reached the Irish top 10, while the first two charted in the UK top 20.

== Background ==
Ash released their debut studio album 1977 in May 1996. With its release, frontman Tim Wheeler left school to tour the album for a year and a half. Suffering from writer's block, he was unable to write new material while touring. Wheeler wanted to explore more of the darker but melodic nature of "Goldfinger", a track from 1977. As Ash were supporting Weezer on their US tour, Wheeler became interested in the interplay between Rivers Cuomo and Brian Bell; he dreamt of having another member who could play certain parts while he simply sang. Nightnurse guitarist Charlotte Hatherley joined Ash temporarily, after learning the band wanted another guitarist, in August 1997. She had previously met Wheeler when Ash and Nightnurse shared a rehearsal room in London, and liked their singles.

Hatherley made her recording debut as part of Ash with the release of "A Life Less Ordinary", taken from the film of the same name, in October 1997. It was the first song they had written since the making of 1977 over a year before. Impressed by her contribution to the band, she became an official member. They felt pressed to follow-up the success of 1977 while also evolving themselves. Ash wanted to break free from the pigeonholing they experienced; in Germany, the band was marketed similar to a boy band, while in Australia, 1977 was released with postcards of each member, both of which Wheeler disliked.

According to Wheeler, in an attempt to be seen as more serious artists they wanted to make "a more abrasive record" but "be as successful as before and keep it going". Wheeler said they were "psychologically damaged" from the 1977 cycle, resulting in the members being on separate wavelengths. He was becoming aware that contemporary acts of theirs were making darker-sounding music, listing off Radiohead and Unkle. They spent a few months at Stambridge Farm, which had been turned into a residential writing studio, coming up with several new tracks and working on developing their sound. Wheeler had his own cottage detached from the main house where the rest of the band stayed to deal with his writer's block.

== Recording and production ==
Ash recorded Nu Clear Sounds at Rockfield Studios in Wales during early and mid-1998. The band, Chris Kimsey and Owen Morris produced the sessions, with David Nicholas handling recording. Nick Brine, Sorrel Merchant and Damon Iddins did additional engineering. The band had an argument with Morris before making "A Life Less Ordinary" and had begun recording Nu Clear Sounds with Kimsey for two weeks. They recorded nearly all the album, except one track, live in the studio. Ash had previously built tracks by laying each instrument separately; Wheeler said the live aspect "as a band sort of worked a lot better".

In between sessions, the band played three UK shows and several European festivals. Mixing was done at the Astoria in London. Kimsey was trying to drive a wedge between the band during the mixing; they were unhappy with how some of the tracks sounded and sought to involve Morris. Morris and Ash mixed the recordings; Morris completely remixed "Death Trip 21" over the course of a weekend while the band played shows. He also altered Kimsey's arrangements of "Low Ebb" and "I'm Gonna Fall", alongside adding "more darkness and intimacy" to "Aphrodite". Additional recording was done at the Astoria. Mike Marsh mastered the recordings.

== Music and lyrics ==
Musically, the sound of Nu-Clear Sounds has been described as garage rock. Drummer Rick McMurray said the New York Dolls, the Velvet Underground and the Rolling Stones circa Sticky Fingers (1971) inspired the album. Wheeler wrote the lyrics for all the tracks, except for "Wildsurf", which he co-wrote with Hatherley. He wrote the music for most of the tracks, with the exception of "Projects" (co-written by bassist Mark Hamilton and Hatherley), "Jesus Says" (written solely by Hamilton), "Death Trip 21" (co-written by Wheeler and Hamilton), "Numbskull" (written solely by Hamilton) and "I'm Gonna Fall" (co-written by Wheeler and Hamilton). Discussing her vocals throughout the album, Hatherley said she was "drinking a lot and wasn’t focused on singing at all. I was just singing backing vocals and trying my best to get away with it". Consumable Online writer Robin Lapid felt that Hatherley brought "plenty of glam-punk, heavy-artillery riffage" into the band's sound.

Nu-Clear Sounds is dominated by either harder-sounding songs—namely "Projects", "Jesus Says", "Numberskull" and "Fortune Teller"—or ballads, such as "Low Ebb", "Folk Song", "Burn Out", "Aphrodite" and "I'm Gonna Fall". Nearly every song on the album has what Hamilton referred to as "searing atmospherics", which he said reflected their state of mind. The ballads marked a shift from the punk rock-like tracks Ash were known for, showcasing the burn out they were going through, while the harder tracks were "a mixture of frustration". In a 2004 interview, Wheeler remarked, "That was a hazy time when we didn't really know what we were doing. Nu-Clear Sounds captures that well: one half consists of schizophrenic, crazy noise rock and the other half with only gloomy ballads". Hossam Ramzy and Dave Larkin contributed percussion; Wil Malone arranged the strings.

The opening metal track "Projects" uses Nirvana-influenced guitar riffs. It starts off with the sounds of strings and a bleep noise from R2-D2, a character from Star Wars (1977). The bass part and Hatherley's guitar parts conflict with each other rhythmically; the track was initially called "Pickefoo", alluding to the bands Pixies and the Foo Fighters. The Oasis-esque ballad "Low Ebb" talks about despair and hope, relating to the pressure Wheeler was feeling with his writer's block. "Jesus Says" discusses the pressure of a job promotion and using alcohol to deal with it. The song evokes the sound of both the Jesus and Mary Chain and the New York Dolls, while it heavily features percussion instrumentation, courtesy of Ramsey. The Beach Boys-styled "Wildsurf" was one of the first tracks written for Nu-Clear Sounds. The song was described by Hamilton as most reminiscent of the material on 1977 and features a guitar solo by Hatherley, which was edited down for the final version.

"Death Trip 21" sounds like a mix between the Chemical Brothers and Metallica, and tells the story of a dead drug dealer. It features turntable scratching, courtesy of Dick Kurtaine. The down-tempo "Folk Song" includes elements reminiscent of New Order and talks about lost innocence. The Pixies-indebted "Numbskull" opens with Wheeler screaming in a similar vein to Henry Rollins, and features turntable scratching. Hamilton wrote the music while on a sofa in the studio control room. "Burn Out" employs a 1960s-like vocal melody in the style of Phil Spector. "Aphrodite" comes across as a rock version of the Ronettes. With "Fortune Teller", Wheeler evokes the Stooges frontman Iggy Pop. Ash said it was the "sound of us just blowing away all the bullshit we’d been dealing with and just going for it". The closing track, "I'm Gonna Fall", features strings that Morris sent through a Fender amplifier with added distortion, making them become inaudible.

== Release and promotion ==
On 14 July 1998, Nu-Clear Sounds was announced for release in three months' time. The following month, Ash played a few festivals in mainland Europe and appeared at the Reading Festival. After a premier on BBC Radio 1, "Jesus Says" was released as the album's lead single on 21 September 1998. Two versions were released on CD: one with "Taken Out" and "Heroin, Vodka, White Noise", while the other included "Radiation" and "Dancing on the Moon". The music video for "Jesus Says" sees the band perform in an atic as the camera swivels 360-degrees. In October and early November 1998, the band embarked on a tour of the United Kingdom. Nu-Clear Sounds was released on 5 October. The Australian version featured "Radiation" and "Dancing on the Moon", while the European edition featured "Taken Out". The Japanese version included "Taken Out" and "A Life Less Ordinary". In the United States, Ash had been on Reprise Records, who released 1977 in that territory; for Nu-Clear Sounds, the band ran into issues with Reprise's owner Warner Bros. Records, delaying the album's US release.

From mid-November to late December 1998, Ash embarked on a European tour. Idlewild and the Chicks appeared on the first handful of shows, while Carrie appeared on the rest of the dates. "Wildsurf" was released as the second single from Nu-Clear Sounds on 23 November. Two versions were released on CD: one with "Stormy Waters" and "When I'm Tired" and the other with "Lose Control" and "Gonna Do It Soon". The music video for "Wildsurf" shows the band performing in front of an assortment of TV screens, cut with footage of a woman exploring buildings and hallways. The band closed the year with two shows in their home country of Ireland. In January 1999, the band appeared at Big Day Out in New Zealand and Australia, before embarking on a Japanese tour the following month. Ash played a benefit show for the Campaign for a Living Wage charity in mid-April 1999, preceded by three warm-up shows. The Numbskull EP was released on 26 April, with covers of "Who You Drivin' Now" by Mudhoney and "Blew" by Nirvana, along with live versions of "Jesus Says", "Girl from Mars" and "Fortune Teller".

The music video for "Numbskull" premiered for The Jo Whiley Show on 5 May 1999. Directed by Darran Tiernan, the video features people having sex in a hotel room, amidst blood and drugs and a naked Wheeler. Author Dave Thompson wrote in his book Alternative Rock (2000) that these depictions got the video banned by TV broadcasters across Europe. In June 1999, the band played a few showcase shows in the US and three UK shows, leading up to a performance at the Glastonbury Festival. Ash played a few European festivals and a show in Ireland in September. After originally being scheduled for release in June and then in August, Nu-Clear Sounds, which included the bonus track "A Life Less Ordinary", was eventually released in the US on 28 September 1999 through DreamWorks Records. Garbage drummer Butch Vig re-sequenced the order of the songs and remixed "Jesus Says", "Wildsurf" and "Folk Song" for the release. Vig got involved after he had approached the band; he was found of the album and played it every night before Garbage went on stage. They planned to promote it with a US tour in October, however, the A&R person at DreamWorks left, resulting in the tour being shortened to three shows.

Ash's first compilation album Intergalactic Sonic 7″s (2003) included "Jesus Says", "Wildsurf" and "Numbskull". Their second compilation album The Best of Ash (2011) included "Wildsurf". "Jesus Says", "Wildsurf", and "Numbskull" were released on 7" vinyl as part of '94–'04 The 7" Singles Box Set (2019). The band's third compilation album Teenage Wildlife: 25 Years of Ash (2020) included "Projects", "Jesus Says" and "Wildsurf". BMG released Nu-Clear Sounds on CD in 2019.

== Reception ==
Professional ratings
Review scores
Source	Rating
AllMusic	4.5/5 stars
Alternative Rock	8/10
NME	8/10
Pitchfork	6.9/10
Rock Hard	6/10
Wall of Sound	80/100

Nu-Clear Sounds was met with generally positive reviews from music critics. AllMusic reviewer Jason Ankeny said that while the album "lacks the immediate appeal" of 1977, "over the course of repeated listens it emerges as the group's most bracing effort to date". He further wrote that Hatherley "galvanizes ... Wheeler's songs, giving them a dimension and scope they previously lacked". Sylvia Patterson of NME noted two of the songs are "completely unlistenable to anyone over the age of 15", which "only serve to make 'Nu-Clear Sounds' the very first 'mainstream' rock'n'roll record of 1998 to do its job properly". Wall of Sound's Russell Hall wrote the album sees Ash "building upon the joyous abandon and hook-laden melodies" that exemplified their debut. Thompson praised the band for refining their sound while at the same time including elements of other genres to make a "new clear sound of explosive power." CMJ New Music Report writer Cheryl Botchick said the band provided "its tunes with the kind of pop star impudence that only the English [sic] can pull off with such magnetic results".

Pitchfork contributor Brent DiCrescenzo found Nu-Clear Sounds delivered "simple pleasures, with occasional punch and constant nostalgic sincerity". Alexandra Flood of MTV said that while it "may not be the album that's going to get you to rehang your Union Jack or regrow your sideburns", there is "enough good stuff here at least to make you crave a crumpet". The Irish Times writer Kevin Courtney said Ash "are not really an albums band", adding they "handle the heavyweight artillery with consummate ease, but it's the gentle, almost dippy ballads ... which gives Nu-Clear Sounds its heart of gold". Buffo Schnadelbach of Rock Hard wrote that the band are "far from out of their infancy, they also seem to have matured a little", offering "a whole series of hard-core tracks", alongside "sugar-sweet, mostly flat ballads" that the "fearful metal crowd" might find to "cause nausea, diarrhea or incontinence". Exclaim!'s Rob Bolton said that as Ash get older, "they also seem to be bidding farewell to a lot of the sizzle that they are capable of". He went on to say, "Nu-Clear Sounds is somewhat disjointed ... lack[ing] the consistency of their outstanding prior release".

Nu-Clear Sounds entered the charts at number seven in the UK and number eight in Scotland. The album was later certified gold in the UK by the British Phonographic Industry (BPI) for selling 100,000 copies. Outside these territories, it reached number 37 in Norway, number 44 in Australia and number 86 in Germany. "Jesus Says" charted at number nine in Ireland, alongside reaching number 15 in the UK. "Wildsurf" charted at number seven in Ireland, while it peaked at number 31 in the UK. "Numbskull" charted at number eight in Ireland. In a 2022 interview, when asked about the album's lack of success, Hatherley theorised that it was "down to the singles", explaining that it lacked the "big singalong" songs such as "Girl from Mars" or "Goldfinger".

== Track listing ==
Writing credits per booklet. All recordings produced by Ash, Chris Kimsey, and Owen Morris.

Nu-Clear Sounds track listing
No.	Title	Lyrics	Music	Length
1.	"Projects"	Tim Wheeler	Mark Hamilton; Charlotte Hatherley	3:53
2.	"Low Ebb"	Wheeler	Wheeler	5:00
3.	"Jesus Says"	Wheeler	Hamilton	4:43
4.	"Wildsurf"	Wheeler; Hatherley	Wheeler	3:24
5.	"Death Trip 21"	Wheeler	Wheeler; Hamilton	4:11
6.	"Folk Song"	Wheeler	Wheeler	4:54
7.	"Numbskull"	Wheeler	Hamilton	3:09
8.	"Burn Out"	Wheeler	Wheeler	4:02
9.	"Aphrodite"	Wheeler	Wheeler	4:18
10.	"Fortune Teller"	Wheeler	Wheeler	3:20
11.	"I'm Gonna Fall"	Wheeler	Wheeler; Hamilton	5:14
Total length:				46:12

North American Release Track Listing
No.	Title	Length
1.	"Jesus Says"	4:44
2.	"Wild Surf"	3:29
3.	"Folk Song"	4:12
4.	"Numbskull"	3:10
5.	"Burn Out"	4:02
6.	"Aphrodite"	4:18
7.	"Death Trip 21"	4:11
8.	"Low Ebb"	5:00
9.	"Fortune Teller"	3:20
10.	"Projects"	3:53
11.	"I'm Gonna Fall"	5:14
12.	"A Life Less Ordinary"	4:16
Total length:		50:28

Tracks 1-3 Mixed by Butch Vig.

Japanese Release
No.	Title	Length
12.	"Taken Out"	2:51
13.	"A Life Less Ordinary"	4:16
Total length:		53:19

== Personnel ==
Personnel per booklet.

Ash

- Tim Wheeler – guitar, vocals
- Mark Hamilton – bass
- Rick McMurray – drums
- Charlotte Hatherley – guitar, vocals

Additional musicians

- Dick Kurtaine – DJ
- Hossam Ramzy – percussion
- Dave Larkin – percussion
- Mel Wesson – additional programming (track 6)
- Wil Malone – string arrangements

Production

- Ash – producer, mixing
- Chris Kimsey – producer
- Owen Morris – producer, mixing
- David Nicholas – recording
- Nick Brine – additional engineering
- Sorrel Merchant – additional engineering
- Damon Iddins – additional engineering
- Mike Marsh – mastering
- Grant Fear – photography

== Charts and certifications ==
=== Weekly charts ===
Chart performance for Nu-Clear Sounds
Chart (1998)	Peak position
Australian Albums (ARIA)	44
German Albums (Offizielle Top 100)	86
Norwegian Albums (VG-lista)	37
Scottish Albums (Official Charts)	8
UK Albums (Official Charts)	7

=== Certifications ===
Certifications for Nu-Clear Sounds
Region	Certification	Certified units/sales
United Kingdom (BPI)	Gold	100,000^{^}
^{^} Shipments figures based on certification alone.
