= Jesus Says =

Single by Ash

from the album Nu-Clear Sounds
- B-side: "Radiation", "Dancing on the Moon", "Taken Out", "Heroin, Vodka, White Noise"
- Released: 1998
- Recorded: 1998
- Genre: Alternative rock
- Length: 4:44
- Label: Infectious
- Songwriter: Mark Hamilton
- Producer: Owen Morris

Ash singles chronology
"A Life Less Ordinary" (1997)	"Jesus Says" (1998)	"Wildsurf" (1998)

"Jesus Says" is a song by the band Ash, released as the first single from their second album, Nu-Clear Sounds, in 1998, reaching number 15 in the UK singles chart. It was released as a single CD, a 7-inch vinyl, and as a cassette. "Jesus Says" was Ash's highest selling single until "Shining Light" in 2001. The 7-inch version came with a picture sleeve, and the UK promo version came in a custom rice paper picture wallet.

The song also appears on the "Intergalactic Sonic 7″s" hits collection, and live versions can be found on the "Tokyo Blitz" DVD and the "Numbskull" EP. Additionally, a remix of the song was recorded as a B-side for the "Shining Light" single. The "Shining Light" remix was also released as a white label 12-inch.

The song was remixed for American release by Butch Vig. The song featured in the soundtrack for the film Swimfan.

== B-sides ==
The B-side "Radiation" appeared on the CD1 version of the single and was an indicator of the tone of the upcoming album.

"Dancing on the Moon" also appeared on the CD1 version. It was Ash's first single to be released in 2CD formats. Rick McMurray did not turn up for the recording session, so Danny Goffey of Supergrass recorded the drumming for this track instead.

"Taken Out" appears on the CD2 edition (as well as on the Cosmic Debris B-sides collection), and was the first track solely written and sung by newly employed guitarist, Charlotte Hatherley. Rick McMurray claims that it's one of his favourite songs to play. "Heroin, Vodka, White Noise" was also on CD2.

== Music video ==
The video for "Jesus Says" was directed by Howard Greenhalgh. The majority of the video takes place in an abandoned warehouse in which a party is taking place while the band perform. The video features near-constant rotational camera movement, which led to MTV receiving complaints about the video's apparent 'nauseousness', which led to a second video to be released, with toned-down spinning effects.

== Track listing ==
All tracks written and composed by Hamilton/Wheeler; except where indicated.

CD1

1. "Jesus Says"
2. "Radiation"
3. "Dancing On The Moon" (Hamilton)

CD2

1. "Jesus Says" - 4:47
2. "Taken Out" (Hatherley) - 2:53
3. "Heroin, Vodka, White Noise" - 5:52

7"

1. "Jesus Says (Album Version)"
2. "Taken Out" (Hatherley)

Promo CD

1. "Jesus Says (Album Version)"
2. "Jesus Says (Radio Edit)"
