= Numbskull =

Numbskull may refer to:

- "Numbskull" (song), a 1999 song by Ash
- Numbskull – San Luis Obispo Ca 11/2/05, a 2006 rock album
- Numskull (born 1976), rapper from Oakland, California
- Numbskull Emptybrook (Finnish: Uuno Turhapuro), the main character of the Finnish comedy film Uuno Turhapuro and its sequels
- The Numskulls, a UK comic strip in The Beano
