= Wildsurf =

Single by Ash

from the album Nu-Clear Sounds
- B-side: "Stormy Waters", "When I'm Tired", "Lose Control", "Gonna Do It Soon"
- Released: 1998
- Recorded: 1998
- Genre: Alternative rock
- Length: 3:26
- Label: Infectious
- Songwriter(s): Charlotte Hatherley, Tim Wheeler
- Producer(s): Owen Morris

Ash singles chronology
"Jesus Says" (1998)	"Wildsurf" (1998)	"Numbskull" (1999)

"Wildsurf" is a song by Ash, released as the second single from the album Nu-Clear Sounds in 1998. It reached 31 in the UK Singles Chart, while doing less prominently in BBC Radio 1, where it was placed in the "C" list. The single was released in CD, 7" vinyl, and cassette.

"Wildsurf" has been described by many of having a "summery" feel to it. Tim once said of it: "I was reading Jack Kerouac's 'On The Road' while we were on the road and it really inspired this song. It's about living life, burning like roman candles across the night." The song was written drawing inspiration from the styles of Nirvana and The Beach Boys.

An extended version of the song was featured in the CD2 release. She one contains an additional guitar solo by Hatherley. The song can also be found on the "Intergalactic Sonic 7″s" hits collection, as well as on the "Tokyo Blitz" DVD. The track was remixed by Butch Vig for release in America. This is the only song from Nu-Clear Sounds selected for Ash's album released in 2011 "The Best of Ash".

== B-sides ==
"Stormy Waters" (CD1) was the first song fully written by drummer Rick McMurray. It appears on the "Cosmic Debris" B-sides collection. McMurray wrote it for his girlfriend after their first argument.

The second CD1 B-side, "When I'm Tired" is another of the "Nu-Clear Sounds" era bittersweet 'burn-out' songs, although with a slightly faster pace than some of its contemporaries.

The CD2 track, "Lose Control" is a cover of a Peak & Backwater song. It was performed regularly on the accompanying "Nu-Clear Sounds" tour. It can also be found on the Cosmic Debris collection.

Lastly, "Gonna Do It Soon" is the second song written by Charlotte Hatherley. It was originally a Nightnurse song (Hatherley's former band), but she re-worked the lyrics for the song to appear as a new Ash B-side.

== Music video ==
The video was directed by Howard Greenhalgh. Ash said of the video: "Howard took us to the Natural History Museum in London. There we shot performance against giant video screens and metallic globes. We also headed to East London for more performance shots in the Docklands area. The video follows a sci-fi looking chick obsessed with water. She has some kinda weird aqua car and then ends up surfing a tsunami which destroys the city. The final special effect shot is so tacky and crap it's laughable!"

== Track listing ==
CD one

1. "Wildsurf" (Hatherley/Wheeler)
2. "Stormy Waters" (McMurray)
3. "When I'm Tired" (Wheeler)

CD two

1. "Wildsurf (Extended version)" (Hatherley/Wheeler)
2. "Lose Control" (Backwater/Peak)
3. "Gonna Do It Soon" (Hatherley)

7"

1. "Wildsurf" (Hatherley/Wheeler)
2. "Stormy Waters" (McMurray)

Promo CD

1. "Wildsurf" (Hatherley/Wheeler)
2. "Wildsurf (Video)"
