= Ad Astra (album) =

Studio album by Ash
- Released: 3 October 2025
- Length: 43:33
- Label: Fierce Panda
- Producer: Tim Wheeler

Ash chronology
Race the Night (2023)	Ad Astra (2025)

Singles from Ad Astra
- 1. "Jump in the Line" Released: 2 April 2025; 2. "Give Me Back My World" Released: 21 July 2025; 3. "Which One Do You Want?" Released: 1 September 2025; 4. "Fun People" Released: 1 September 2025

Professional ratings
Aggregate scores
Source	Rating
Metacritic	79/100
Review scores
Source	Rating
Clash	8/10
Classic Rock	4/5 stars
Kerrang!	4/5
God Is in the TV	9/10
Louder Than War	4.5/5 stars
Record Collector	4/5 stars
Uncut	7/10

Ad Astra is the ninth studio album by Northern Irish rock band Ash, released on 3 October 2025 through Fierce Panda Records.

== Track listing ==
All songs written by Tim Wheeler, except where noted.

Ad Astra track listing
No.	Title	Writer(s)	Length
1.	"Zarathustra"	Richard Strauss	1:33
2.	"Which One Do You Want?"		3:31
3.	"Fun People" (featuring Graham Coxon)		3:49
4.	"Give Me Back My World"		2:43
5.	"Hallion"	Wheeler, Ilan Eshkeri	3:34
6.	"Deadly Love"		6:06
7.	"My Favourite Ghost"		3:13
8.	"Jump in the Line"	Lord Kitchener	3:27
9.	"Keep Dreaming"		3:29
10.	"Dehumanised"		4:20
11.	"Ghosting"		2:33
12.	"Ad Astra" (featuring Graham Coxon)		5:15
Total length:			43:33

== Personnel ==
Personnel per booklet.

Ash

- Tim Wheeler – vocals, guitars, keyboards, programming, percussion
- Mark Hamilton – bass
- Rick McMurray – drums, percussion

Additional musicians

- Graham Coxon - guitar, vocals (tracks 3 and 12)
- Julia Restoin Roitfeld - shouts (track 3)
- Romy Konjic Restoin - shouts (track 3)
- Ilan Eshkeri - string arrangement (tracks 5 and 7), programming (track 1)
- Angie McCrisken - spoken intro (track 5)
- Jo Dudderidge - backing vocals (track 5), additional piano (track 7)
- Pat Dam Smyth - backing vocals (track 5)
- Tim Wheeler, Graeme Young & Rick McMurray - claps & stomps on (tracks 3, 8 and 9)
- Pat Wheeler & Mark Arigho - additional handclaps (track 8)
- Mark Hamilton - scream (track 8)
- Strings (tracks 5 and 7) performed by the LMO:
  - John Mils - violin
  - Matthew Ward - violin
  - Bob Smissen - viola
  - Nick Cooper - cello

Production

- Tim Wheeler – producer
- Claudius Mittendorfer – mixing
- John Webber – mastering

== Charts ==
Chart performance for Ad Astra
Chart (2025)	Peak position
Irish Independent Albums (IRMA)	19
Scottish Albums (OCC)	4
UK Albums (OCC)	15
UK Independent Albums (OCC)	2
