= Jack Names the Planets =

1994 song by Ash

Single by Ash

from the album Trailer
- B-side: "Don't Know"
- Released: February 1994
- Recorded: 1993
- Genre: Punk rock
- Length: 3:12
- Label: La-La Land
- Songwriter: Tim Wheeler
- Producer: Mark Waterman

Ash singles chronology
"Jack Names the Planets" (1994)	"Petrol" (1994)

"Jack Names the Planets (2002 re-release)"

Single by Ash

from the album Intergalactic Sonic 7″s
- B-side: "Don't Know", "Season"
- Released: 2 December 2002
- Recorded: 1993
- Genre: Punk rock
- Length: 3:12
- Label: Double Dragon
- Songwriter: Tim Wheeler
- Producer: Mark Waterman

Ash singles chronology
"Envy" (2002)	"Jack Names the Planets (2002 re-release)" (2002)	"Orpheus" (2004)

"Jack Names the Planets" is the debut single by Ash, released in February 1994. The single was originally released on vinyl only and is entirely different from the album version that appears on their EP, Trailer. The single was re-released on 2 December 2002 in CD format as a limited edition with the Raptor 12" version of "Season" as an extra B-side, as part of the promotion for the Intergalactic Sonic 7″s greatest hits collection.

The song first appeared on the Shed demo tape, recorded in 1992 and again on the Garage Girl and Pipe Smokin' Brick demo-tapes. Ash were first signed when a copy of Garage Girl was given to Stephen 'Tav' Tavner, who signed them on the basis of "Jack Names the Planets".

Only 2,000 copies of the single were released, and the single was recorded on a £300 budget. However, the band was unhappy with the version released on the 1994 single, and re-recorded it for their first album.

The single's B-side, "Don't Know", first appeared on the Garage Girl demo tape.

In 1995, the song appeared on the soundtrack for the film Angus. Clips from the movie were interspersed with footage of Ash performing as figures in moving posters for the video of "Jack Names the Planets", which was also released in 1995. Phil Harder directed the video.

The first 50,000 pressings of Ash's first full-length album, 1977, began with "Jack Names the Planets" and "Don't Know" as hidden tracks found by rewinding the CD, before the usual opener "Lose Control". "Jack Names the Planets" also appeared on Ash's first greatest hits collection Intergalactic Sonic 7″s, and is considered a fan and band favourite. It is rare not to be included in the band's live setlist.

During the spoken section at the beginning of the song, two Dutchmen, Oscar "Wilde" Vermeer and Patrick "The Brewer" Schrama (who met Tim Wheeler during a holiday in France), suggest that the song should have been called "Jack Names The Planet Nieuw-Vennep", given that, in their opinion, "Nieuw-Vennep" is a good name for a planet. Nieuw-Vennep is a town of thirty thousand inhabitants in the west of the Netherlands, midway between The Hague and Amsterdam.

== Track listing ==
1994 7″

1. "Jack Names the Planets" (Wheeler)
2. "Don't Know" (Ash)

2002 CD re-release

1. "Jack Names the Planets" (Wheeler)
2. "Don't Know" (Ash)
3. "Season" (Wheeler)
