= Sometimes (Ash song) =

2001 single by Ash

Single by Ash

from the album Free All Angels
- B-side: "Skullfull of Sulphur"; "So the Story Goes"; "Teenage Kicks"; "Melon Farmer" (live)
- Released: 9 July 2001
- Length: 4:07
- Label: Infectious; Home Grown
- Songwriter(s): Tim Wheeler
- Producer(s): Owen Morris

Ash singles chronology
"Burn Baby Burn" (2001)	"Sometimes" (2001)	"Candy" (2001)

Alternative cover
- CD 2 cover

"Sometimes" is a song by the Northern Irish rock band Ash. It was the third single released from their third studio album, Free All Angels (2001). It was released on 9 July 2001 as two CD singles (the first of which being an enhanced CD), as a 7-inch vinyl (which was limited edition and came with a numbered picture gatefold sleeve), and a DVD single. Although "Sometimes" reached only number 21 on the UK Singles Chart, it helped contribute to increase in sales for Free All Angels. The song also reached number 41 in Ireland.

"Sometimes" is a poetic love song, and is regarded as one of the stand out tracks from the album. The song originally slated to be the second single from the album, but the band opted for the heavier track "Burn Baby Burn" in its place.

The song is almost always present in the live set, and is definitely a fan favourite, showing a different side to the band than that of heavier albums such as 1977 and Meltdown. The song can also be found on the Intergalactic Sonic 7″s hits collection.

== B-sides ==
The first B-side on CD1 is "Skullfull of Sulphur", a Wheeler track based around an acoustic guitar. "So the Story Goes" is also a Wheeler track and appears as a bonus track on the US version of "Free All Angels". The first CD2 B-side, "Teenage Kicks" is a cover of the Undertones track, which was later performed on Later... with Jools Holland by the band. This version of the song features Undertones' guitarist Damian O'Neill. After John Peel's death in 2004, who was a great supporter of Ash, the band played this song live at Glastonbury 2005 in tribute to him. Lastly, "Melon Farmer" is a cover of a Lazer-Gun Nun song. It was originally performed on the Peel Sessions as a joke but was so popular that Ash included it as a B-side and on the Cosmic Debris collection.

== Music video ==
The video for "Sometimes" was directed by Jeff Thomas. It was filmed in Cuba, and basically consists of Tim playing the acoustic guitar on the street while the band drive around in a green car. The action shows the Cuban model Arianne playing Tim's girlfriend, breaking up with him while Tim plays the acoustic on the bed. At the end of the video, Tim jumps into the back of the car, and they drive off into the sunset. The shoot was not incident free. At one point, the roof of the building which the band were recording in collapsed. Several crew members when taken to hospital, but they only had minor bumps and bruises.

"Sometimes" was also released as a DVD. The DVD features the single, a stills gallery, lyrics and an Ash discography. It also includes Ash's second 20-minute short, "Episode 2: Back from the Edge". The CD2 version of the CD contains version 1.1 of the "Ash Video Mixer" software.

== Track listings ==
All tracks were written and composed by Tim Wheeler except where indicated.

CD1 (Enhanced)

1. "Sometimes" (radio edit)
2. "Skullfull of Sulphur"
3. "So the Story Goes"
4. "Sometimes" (video)

CD2

1. "Sometimes" (album version)
2. "Teenage Kicks" (JJ O'Neill)
3. "Melon Farmer" (live) (Lowe/Peak)

DVD

1. "Sometimes" (DVD audio)
2. Episode 2: Back from the Edge
3. Stills gallery
4. Discography
5. Lyrics

7-inch

1. "Sometimes" (album version)
2. "So the Story Goes"
3. "Skullfull of Sulphur"
4. "Teenage Kicks" (O'Neill)

== Charts ==
Chart (2001)	Peak position
Europe (Eurochart Hot 100)	83
Ireland (IRMA)	41
Scotland (OCC)	16
UK Singles (OCC)	21
UK Indie (OCC)	3

== Release history ==
Region	Date	Format(s)	Label(s)	Ref.
United Kingdom	9 July 2001	CD; DVD	Infectious; Home Grown	
United Kingdom	16 July 2001	7-inch vinyl	Infectious; Home Grown	
Japan	5 September 2001	CD	Sony Int'l	
