= Petrol (song) =

1994 single by Ash

Single by Ash

from the album Trailer
- B-side: "The Little Pond"; "A Message from Oscar Wilde and Patrick the Brewer"; "Things"
- Released: 15 August 1994
- Length: 4:11
- Label: Infectious
- Songwriter(s): Tim Wheeler; Mark Hamilton
- Producer(s): Mark Waterman

Ash singles chronology
"Jack Names the Planets" (1994)	"Petrol" (1994)	"Uncle Pat" (1994)

"Petrol" is a song by Northern Irish rock band Ash, released as the second single from their 1994 mini-album, Trailer, and as their first single on Infectious Records. It was released on 15 August 1994 on CD and 7-inch vinyl format. Only 500 copies of the 7-inch format were released and came with a numbered picture sleeve. The song reached number 96 on the UK Singles Chart in 1994, becoming their first single to reach the UK top 100.

"Petrol" was first recorded on the "Garage Girl" demo tape and later appeared on Ash's debut live album, Live at the Wireless, and again on Ash's first greatest hits collection, "Intergalactic Sonic 7″s". The song is said to be about being "lynched" by a gang.

== B-sides ==
B-side "The Little Pond" first appeared on the "Garage Girl" demo-tape. Tim Wheeler has expressed his dissatisfaction with this recording, and has even mentioned re-recording it as an acoustic B-side on a future album. The second B-side, "A Message from Oscar Wilde and Patrick the Brewer", is a spoken-word track, lasting just 30 seconds and consisting of an excerpt of a tape Wheeler was sent of two of his Dutch friends, Oscar and Patrick, talking to each other. This track also appears on the "Cosmic Debris" B-sides collection and on Ash's debut album, "Trailer". The third B-side, "Things", first appeared on the "Shed" demo tape. Ash bassist Mark Hamilton claims that "Things" is his least favourite Ash song of all time.

== Track listings ==
CD

1. "Petrol" (Hamilton, Wheeler)
2. "The Little Pond" (Wheeler)
3. "A Message from Oscar Wilde and Patrick the Brewer" (Hamilton, Wheeler)
4. "Things" (Wheeler)

7-inch

1. "Petrol" (Hamilton, Wheeler)
2. "The Little Pond" (Wheeler)
3. "A Message from Oscar Wilde and Patrick the Brewer" (Hamilton, Wheeler)
