= Race the Night =

Studio album by Ash
- Released: 15 September 2023
- Studio: Atomic Heart; Buspace; Ten 87; Chamber; BSMNT
- Genre: Pop-punk
- Length: 42:57
- Label: Fierce Panda
- Producer: Tim Wheeler

Ash chronology
Islands (2018)	Race the Night (2023)	Ad Astra (2025)

Singles from Race the Night
- 1. "Race the Night" Released: 14 June 2023; 2. "Like a God" Released: 19 July 2023; 3. "Usual Places" Released: 15 August 2023; 4. "Crashed Out Wasted" Released: 30 August 2023

Race the Night is the eighth studio album by Northern Irish rock band Ash, released on 15 September 2023 through Fierce Panda Records. It was produced by Tim Wheeler and received generally positive reviews from critics.

== Critical reception ==
Professional ratings
Aggregate scores
Source	Rating
Metacritic	69/100
Review scores
Source	Rating
The Arts Desk	3/5 stars
Hot Press	8/10
The Irish Times	4/5 stars
Kerrang!	3/5
Louder	4/5 stars
Louder Than War	4.5/5
MusicOMH	2.5/5 stars
Uncut	7/10

Race the Night received a score of 69 out of 100 on review aggregator Metacritic based on four critics' reviews, indicating "generally favorable" reception. Uncut stated that "the teenage tyrants of 'Girls From Mars' fame may now be chasing the tail-end of their forties, but they've lost little of that youthful vigour", and Classic Rock wrote that "Ash still put out heart and reliable joy". Alice Clark of Louder found it to be "full of all the elements that have served them well since their formation back in 1992: crunching guitars, super-charged riffs, gorgeous pop smarts and lyrics for the most part that rejoice in being in a band and lost in music".

Kerrang!'s James Hickie called the album a "sleeker and more adaptable vehicle" on which "there are heavy moments [...] but they differ wildly in their approach", concluding that Race the Night "deftly hit[s] all of the touchpoints that make Ash such a special band". Louder Than War's Wayne Carey summarised Race the Night as "a heady collection of anthems [that] proves they still have it after 30 years of nuclear sound", calling it "an album of the year".

Tony Clayton-Lea of The Irish Times opined that Ash have "stuck to the bones of the punchy blueprint with which we are familiar" and on some songs they "flesh it out even further with exceptional results". John Walshe of Hot Press wrote that the "trio still know their way around a catchy hook" and "there's something wonderfully reassuring about the fact that 27 years after their debut album, Ash still sound like pissed-up teenagers crashing the party, and having an absolute blast".

John Murphy of MusicOMH described it as "11 tracks of pacey, fuzzy guitar rock (with the odd ballad thrown in) but, sadly, the tunes aren't as memorable as of yore" and "weirdly dated". Thomas H Green of The Arts Desk called it Ash's "most heavy rock since 2004's Meltdown" and "the best of it is an enjoyable romp[,] which is not to say that it's all loveable. Their trademark power pop harmonies are in place, but sometimes there's a polish to the production that recalls a poppier Bring Me the Horizon" that is "not appealing".

== Track listing ==
All tracks are written by Tim Wheeler.

Race the Night track listing
No.	Title	Length
1.	"Race the Night"	4:04
2.	"Usual Places"	3:38
3.	"Reward in Mind"	3:49
4.	"Oslo" (featuring Démira)	4:29
5.	"Like a God"	4:14
6.	"Peanut Brain"	1:39
7.	"Crashed Out Wasted"	6:38
8.	"Braindead"	3:19
9.	"Double Dare"	2:51
10.	"Over & Out"	4:41
11.	"Like a God (Reprise)"	3:35
Total length:		42:57

== Personnel ==
Ash

- Tim Wheeler – vocals, guitars, keyboards, production, engineering
- Mark Hamilton – bass guitar
- Rick McMurray – drums, percussion

Additional musicians

- Keith Murray – backing vocals on "Reward in Mind", claps and shouts on "Braindead"
- Keith Carne – drum intro on "Reward in Mind"
- Démira Jansen – vocals on "Oslo"
- Sinfonia Nord – strings on "Oslo"
- Ilan Eshkeri – violin on "Crashed Out Wasted"
- Drew Citron – vocals on "Crashed Out Wasted"
- Andy Burrows – toms on "Braindead"
- Dick Kurtaine – scratching on "Double Dare"
- Simon Scheuer – claps and shouts on "Braindead"
- Julian Tepper – claps and shouts on "Braindead"

Technical

- John Webber – mastering
- Claudius Mittendorfer – mixing
- Graeme Young – additional engineering on "Usual Places", "Peanut Brain", "Crashed Out Wasted", and "Over & Out"
- Ilan Eshkeri – string arrangement on "Oslo"

Visuals

- Pete Lloyd – illustrations, Ash logo design
- Stuart Ford – artwork layout
- Steve Gullick – photography

== Charts ==
Chart performance for Race the Night
Chart (2023)	Peak position
Irish Albums (IRMA)	60
Scottish Albums (OCC)	3
UK Albums (OCC)	14
UK Independent Albums (OCC)	3
