= Envy (song) =

Single by Northern Irish band Ash

Single by Ash

from the album Intergalactic Sonic 7″s
- Released: 26 August 2002
- Label: Infectious; Home Grown
- Songwriter(s): Tim Wheeler
- Producer(s): Dave Eringa, Ash

Ash singles chronology
"Walking Barefoot" (2002)	"Envy" (2002)	"Clones" (2004)

Envy
- CD2 cover

"Envy" is a song by Northern Irish rock band Ash. The song was one of two new songs on their compilation album Intergalactic Sonic 7″s (2002) and was released as a single on 26 August 2002. "Envy" reached number 21 on the UK Singles Chart and number 41 on the Irish Singles Chart. The music video featured Andy Dick driving a taxi cab, screaming at the band to get out of his cab.

== Track listings ==
CD 1

1. "Envy"
2. "I Don't Mind"
3. "Bad Karma Blues"

CD 2

1. "Envy"
2. "Tonight You Belong To Me"
3. "I Shall Not Die"

DVD

1. "Envy" (DVD Audio)
2. "I Don't Mind" (DVD Audio)
3. "Bad Karma Blues" (DVD Audio)
4. "Envy" (Video)
5. "Girl From Mars" (30 second Video Clip)
6. "Oh Yeah" (30 second Video Clip)
7. "Kung Fu" (30 second Video Clip)
8. "Angel Interceptor" (30 second Video Clip)

7-inch single

1. "Envy"
2. "Bad Karma Blues"
3. "I Shall Not Die"
4. "I Don't Mind"

== Charts ==
Chart (2002)	Peak position
Europe (Eurochart Hot 100)	85
Ireland (IRMA)	41
Scotland (OCC)	20
UK Singles (OCC)	21
UK Indie (OCC)	3

== Release history ==
Region	Date	Format(s)	Label(s)	Ref.
United Kingdom	26 August 2002	7-inch vinyl; CD; DVD	Infectious; Home Grown	
Japan	11 September 2002	CD	Sony Int'l	
Australia	14 October 2002	CD	Infectious; Home Grown; Festival Mushroom	
