= Shining Light =

2001 single by Ash

Single by Ash

from the album Free All Angels
- B-side: "Warmer than Fire"; "Gabriel"; "Feel No Pain"; "Jesus Says" (remix)
- Released: 29 January 2001
- Genre: Power pop; dream pop
- Length: 5:09 (album version); 4:07 (radio edit)
- Label: Infectious; Home Grown
- Songwriter: Tim Wheeler
- Producer: Owen Morris

Ash singles chronology
"Numbskull" (1999)	"Shining Light" (2001)	"Burn Baby Burn" (2001)

Music video
- "Shining Light" on YouTube

Alternative cover
- CD 2 cover

"Shining Light" is a song by Ash, which was released as the first single from their album Free All Angels. It was released on 29 January 2001. It was released as a single CD (released on 2CD formats) and as a 7-inch vinyl (which came with a picture sleeve). It was also Ash's first single to be released as an enhanced CD. "Shining Light" reached number eight on the UK Singles Chart. The song had been covered by fellow Downpatrick songwriter Triona in 2015 which featured on a Power NI advert.

== Recording history ==
"Shining Light" was written about Tim Wheeler's now ex-girlfriend Audrey. Wheeler was driving home in his car when the line and tune "Yeah you are a shining light" came into his head. He rushed home and wrote it straight away on an acoustic guitar. The first time the band heard it, they say that they 'knew it was a hit'.

"Shining Light" was first played at a London Astoria gig in 2000, and is considered to be one of the band's greatest achievements, musically and lyrically. Ash once said of the song:

- Tim: "I think Shining Light's a breath of fresh air"
- Rick: "It's a very melodic song, it sticks in your head, so we thought it'd have a pretty good chance of getting in the Top 10. It was good being back there 'cos it's been a long time, over two years since we had a single out".
- Charlotte: "It was the first song we recorded and we knew it would be the first single".

The song was extremely critically acclaimed and won, among others:

- Ivor Novello Awards 2001 - Best Contemporary Song
- Irish Music Awards 2002 - Best Single

"Shining Light" can also be found on Ash's greatest hits compilation, Intergalactic Sonic 7″s as well as on the Tokyo Blitz DVD.

The song was re-recorded by Canadian artist Emm Gryner on her 2005 album Songs of Love and Death. In addition, this was the song played on the last episode of Roswell as the group in the series drives away forever - signifying the death of the series.

=== B-Sides ===
The B-side "Warmer Than Fire" was originally written by Steve Ludwin of Little Hell. The song was intended to be a download only release for fans, but due to its immense popularity it was released on the "Shining Light" single as well as on the Cosmic Debris b-side collection. The song has also been performed several times live in concert. Rumours that Wheeler bought the royalties for the song from Ludwin for £35 have been denied by the band.

"Warmer than Fire" also had its own music video, directed by Darren Tiernan (Wheeler's cousin). It consists of footage of the band messing around in Puerto Banus, Spain, where Free All Angels was being recorded and climaxes in a burning of a piano. The video cost very little and has rarely been seen.

"Gabriel" also appears on CD1 (as well as on the Cosmic Debris collection) and is considered to be quite a retro-sounding Ash track, reminiscent of "Innocent Smile" on 1977.

"Feel No Pain" is the first b-side on CD2, and was one of the leftover tracks from the Free All Angels recording session. The song is mainly about actually writing a song.

"Jesus Says" originally released on the Nu-Clear Sounds appears as a remix entitled the "Hedrock Valley Beats Lightyear 12-inch mix which appears on CD2.

"Shining Light" has been used as song in advert for Toyota cars in Croatia.

There are three separate edits of "Shining Light." The album version is 5:09 in length and features an extended bridge. The song was edited for radio too at 4:07 with a shortened bridge and guitar solo. The third edit of the song was for the Cosmic Debris collection and is 4:23 in length. The band played the song live according to this edit at many gigs from the Free All Angels tour onwards, however on their latest tour in 2007, the longest version was played.

== Track listings ==
CD1

1. "Shining Light (Radio edit)" (Wheeler)
2. "Warmer Than Fire" (Ludwin)
3. "Gabriel" (Hamilton)

CD2

1. "Shining Light (Album version)" (Wheeler)
2. "Feel No Pain" (Wheeler)
3. "Jesus Says (Hedrock Valley Beats Lightyear Remix)" (Hamilton/Wheeler)
4. "Shining Light (Video)"

7-inch

1. "Shining Light (Album version)" (Wheeler)
2. "Warmer than Fire" (Ludwin)

Promo CD

1. "Shining Light (Radio edit)" (Wheeler)

German Version (Infectious Records / edel Records gmbH | 0124685MSH)

1. "Shining Light (Radio edit)" (Wheeler)
2. "Warmer Than Fire" (Ludwin)
3. "Shining Light (Album version)" (Wheeler)
4. "Gabriel" (Hamilton)
5. "Shining Light" (Video)

== Charts ==
Chart (2001)	Peak position
Australia (ARIA)	69
Europe (Eurochart Hot 100)	42
Ireland (IRMA)	23
Scottish Singles Sales (Official Charts)	7
UK Singles (Official Charts)	8
UK Indie (Official Charts)	1

== Release history ==
Region	Date	Format(s)	Label(s)	Ref.
United Kingdom	29 January 2001	CD; cassette	Infectious; Home Grown	
Australia	19 February 2001	CD	Infectious; Home Grown	
Japan	11 April 2001	CD (with "Burn Baby Burn")	SME	

== Appearances in popular media ==
"Shining Light" was the closing song in the last episode of the American science fiction television series Roswell.

The version recorded by Annie Lennox was used as Elaine Hammond's (Sigourney Weaver) theme song in the US mini-series Political Animals.

"Shining Light" was the closing theme for The Magic Box which was a special simulcast on BBC One NI and UTV; this made Shining Light the last ever song to be broadcast in analogue in the United Kingdom.

== Annie Lennox version ==
"Shining Light"

Single by Annie Lennox

from the album The Annie Lennox Collection
- Released: 2 March 2009
- Length: 4:05 (album version); 3:53 (radio edit)
- Label: RCA
- Songwriter: Tim Wheeler

Annie Lennox singles chronology
"Many Rivers to Cross" (2008)	"Shining Light" (2009)	"Pattern of My Life" (2009)

Music video
- "Shining Light" on YouTube

Annie Lennox's cover of "Shining Light" was released as the first single from The Annie Lennox Collection. The video, which features Lennox singing with an all-woman band (all played by Lennox) in a brightly lit multi-coloured studio, was premiered on MSN Music on 30 January 2009.

=== Background and release ===
The cover attracted praise, with Tim Wheeler from Ash saying, "It's cool – I'm really into it. It makes me proud that someone of her stature and talent is doing something different with our song," and Popjustice making it its Song of the Day on 8 January 2009, saying "…after about 90 seconds it sounds like the greatest noise ever invented by a human".

=== Promotion and charts ===
Lennox performed the song on Friday Night with Jonathan Ross on 6 March 2009 and also on The Paul O'Grady Show (9 March), The One Show (10 March), This Morning (11 March) and was also part of Comic Relief on 13 March 2009. The single was only available by download via Amazon or iTunes. The single became Lennox's first UK top 40 hit as a solo artist since 1995, reaching number 39. (She had reached the top 40 as a member of Eurythmics on three occasions in the interim.) It is also Lennox's final UK top 40 hit to date.

=== Charts ===
Chart (2009)	Peak position
Japan (Oricon)	97
UK Singles (Official Charts)	39
