= Oh Yeah (Ash song) =

1996 single by Ash

Single by Ash

from the album 1977
- B-side: "T. Rex"; "Everywhere Is All Around"; "Does Your Mother Know"
- Released: 24 June 1996
- Genre: Britpop
- Length: 4:45
- Label: Infectious; Home Grown
- Songwriter: Tim Wheeler
- Producer: Owen Morris

Ash singles chronology
"Goldfinger" (1996)	"Oh Yeah" (1996)	"A Life Less Ordinary" (1997)

"Oh Yeah" (occasionally spelt as "Oh Yea") is a song by Northern Irish rock band Ash, released as the fifth single from their debut studio album, 1977 (1996), on 24 June 1996. It was released on CD, 7-inch vinyl, and cassette formats. Upon its release, "Oh Yeah" debuted and peaked at number six on the UK Singles Chart, becoming Ash's second-highest-charting single on the chart following their previous release, "Goldfinger".

== Overview ==
"Oh Yeah" was the first single released after the release of 1977 and was Ash's second top-10 single, reaching number six on the UK Singles Chart. The song features backing vocals from singer Lisa Moorish.

== Track listings ==
UK, European, and Australian CD single

1. "Oh Yeah" (Tim Wheeler)
2. "T. Rex" (Wheeler)
3. "Everywhere Is All Around" (Wheeler, Martin Carr)
4. "Does Your Mother Know" (Benny Andersson, Björn Ulvaeus)

UK 7-inch and cassette single

1. "Oh Yeah" (Wheeler)
2. "T. Rex" (Wheeler)
3. "Everywhere Is All Around" (Wheeler, Carr)
4. "Oh Yeah" (quartet version) (Wheeler)

== Charts ==
Chart (1996)	Peak position
Australia (ARIA)	80
Europe (Eurochart Hot 100)	49
Iceland (Íslenski Listinn Topp 40)	14
Ireland (IRMA)	14
Scotland Singles (OCC)	5
UK Singles (OCC)	6
UK Indie (Music Week)	1
