= Numbskull (song) =

Single by Ash

from the album Nu-Clear Sounds
- Released: 26 April 1999
- Recorded: 1998
- Genre: Grunge, alternative rock
- Length: 3:09
- Label: Infectious
- Songwriter(s): Tim Wheeler
- Producer(s): Phil McKellar

Ash singles chronology
"Wildsurf" (1998)	"Numbskull" (1999)	"Shining Light" (2001)

"Numbskull" is a single released by Ash on 26 April 1999, the third from their album Nu-Clear Sounds. It was a limited edition, individually numbered single of 5,000 on CD and double 7" vinyl. The song, "Numbskull", appeared as track 7 on Nu-Clear Sounds (5 October 1998), and also as the final track on Intergalactic Sonic 7″s (9 September 2002).

The controversial video for the single featured members of the band involved in graphic sex scenes, including sadomasochism. It was directed by Darran Tiernan and also featured self-mutilation, nudity, and drug use.

== Track listing ==
All songs by Tim Wheeler unless otherwise noted.

=== CD ===
1. "Numbskull"
2. "Blew" (Kurt Cobain)
3. "Who You Drivin' Now" (Mudhoney)
4. "Jesus Says (Live)" – (21 September 1998) (Wheeler/Mark Hamilton)
5. "Girl From Mars (Live)" – (31 July 1995)
6. "Fortune Teller (Live)" (Wheeler/Hamilton)

=== 7" ===
1. "Numbskull"
2. "Blew" (Kurt Cobain)
3. "Who You Drivin' Now" (Mudhoney)
4. "Jesus Says" (live) (Wheeler/Hamilton)
