= A Life Less Ordinary (song) =

1997 single by Ash

Single by Ash
- B-side: "What Deaner Was Talking About"; "Where Is Our Love Going?"; "Halloween"
- Released: 13 October 1997
- Length: 4:15
- Label: Infectious; Home Grown
- Songwriter: Tim Wheeler
- Producers: Arthur Baker, Ash

Ash singles chronology
"Oh Yeah!" (1996)	"A Life Less Ordinary" (1997)	"Jesus Says" (1998)

"A Life Less Ordinary" was a non-album single released by the band Ash on 13 October 1997. It was the title track of the film of the same name, A Life Less Ordinary, starring Cameron Diaz and Ewan McGregor, and also appeared on the film's soundtrack. The single was released in three formats: CD, 7-inch vinyl, and cassette. The limited-edition 7-inch was printed on blue vinyl. The song peaked at number ten on the UK Singles Chart.

Ash was personally requested by the director of the film, Danny Boyle. This was also the first song to feature their new guitarist, Charlotte Hatherley.

The song had the working title of "Film Song". Frontman Tim Wheeler had this to say about the lyrics: "This is a song about my muse. Robert Graves wrote a book called 'White Goddess' about the goddess of poetry, which is a concept that goes back to the ancient Greeks. Maybe this makes me sound completely mad, but I have this thing about music coming from a higher place. So, I was writing a song about the goddess. It's a weird love song. It says how I'd sell my soul for something to believe in, something more significant than everyday life."

The song was remixed in a slightly heavier fashion for the Japanese and US versions of Nu-Clear Sounds.

== B-sides ==
The first B-side, "What Deaner Was Talking About," is a cover of the song by Ween from the album Chocolate and Cheese. This track also features on Ash's live album Live at the Wireless.

The B-side "Where is Our Love Going?" follows closer with the sound from their Trailer album than Nu-Clear Sounds. It's a fast-paced number, which later appeared on the Cosmic Debris B-sides collection.

The (CD only) track, "Halloween" also appears on Cosmic Debris, but is much slower paced, telling a tale of loneliness on Halloween night until the subject finally reunites with their friends at the end of the song. The track was originally called "Happy Halloween".

== Music video ==
The directors Hammer & Tongs directed the video for the single, which consists of the band playing on a racetrack inside a heart-shaped area marked with crash barriers. Four cars appear and crash into the band. The cars race forward, with the band still playing the song on the bonnets of the cars. Near the end, the cars crash into each other, throwing a member over the top. However, the cars land perfectly and race off into the distance and out of view. Of course, this being the soundtrack to the film of the same name, footage from the film is used too. Rick was taken ill with bronchitis during the filming of this video, so he has his hood up for the majority of the video. A crew member filled in for him for the latter end of the video.

== Track listings ==
UK and European CD single

1. "A Life Less Ordinary" (Wheeler)
2. "What Deaner was Talking About" (Ween)
3. "Where Is Our Love Going?" (Wheeler)
4. "Halloween" (Wheeler)

UK 7-inch and cassette single

1. "A Life Less Ordinary" (Wheeler)
2. "Where Is Our Love Going?" (Wheeler)
3. "What Deaner was Talking About" (Ween)

== Charts ==
Chart (1997)	Peak position
Australia (ARIA)	88
Europe (Eurochart Hot 100)	49
Ireland (IRMA)	16
Scottish Singles Sales (Official Charts)	12
UK Singles (Official Charts)	10
UK Indie (Official Charts)	2
