= Ash (band) =

Northern Irish rock band

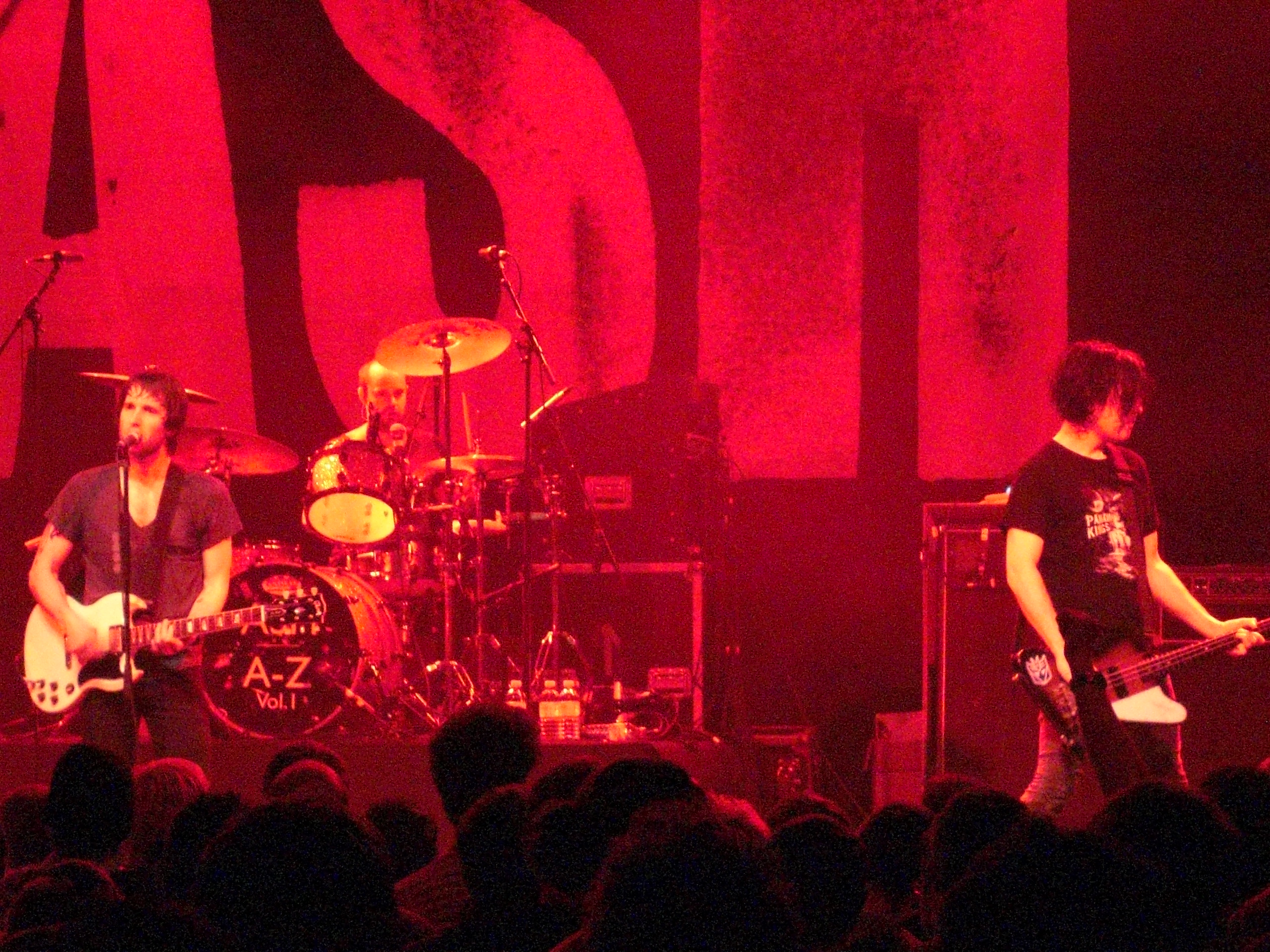
- Ash at the O2 ABC Glasgow in 2010. L to R: Tim Wheeler, Rick McMurray, Mark Hamilton.

Background information
- Origin: Downpatrick, County Down, Northern Ireland
- Genres: Pop-punk; alternative rock; power pop; punk rock; indie rock; Britpop (early)
- Years active: 1992–present
- Labels: Infectious; Edel; Deathstar
- Members: Tim Wheeler; Mark Hamilton; Rick McMurray
- Past members: Charlotte Hatherley
- Website: ash-official.com

Ash are a Northern Irish rock band formed in Downpatrick, County Down, in 1992 by vocalist and guitarist Tim Wheeler, bassist Mark Hamilton and drummer Rick McMurray. As a three-piece, they released mini-album Trailer in 1994 and full-length album 1977 in 1996. This 1996 release was named by NME as one of the 500 greatest albums of all time. After the success of their full debut the band recruited Charlotte Hatherley as a guitarist and vocalist, releasing their second record Nu-Clear Sounds in 1998. After narrowly avoiding bankruptcy, the band released Free All Angels in 2001 and a string of successful singles.

The band became a three-piece again in 2006 when Hatherley left, and after five conventional albums the band released 26 singles in the A-Z Series in 2009, one every two weeks. The band have had one silver, two gold and two platinum-selling (and chart-topping) records in the United Kingdom, as well as 18 songs in the top 40 of the UK Singles Chart. They have been associated with Britpop, though they were not comfortable with the association, as emphasising Britishness could be interpreted as sectarian in Northern Ireland.

== History ==
=== Band beginning, Trailer and 1977 (1989–1997) ===
Ash officially formed in 1992, reportedly having taken the name from the first word they liked in the dictionary. Prior to this, Wheeler and Hamilton were in an Iron Maiden cover band called Vietnam, which had formed in 1989. The new band created three demo tapes that year – Solar Happy in June, Shed in September and the Home Demo in November. These tapes featured their earliest material and the first recordings of some songs that were later on the 1994 release, Trailer, including "Intense Thing", "Get Out", "Obscure Thing", and the future single "Jack Names the Planets".

In 1993 the band recorded the Garage Girl demo tape, which featured "Jack Names the Planets" and "Intense Thing", taken from Shed, and new tracks, including "Petrol". Following Garage Girl, Ash released a compilation demo tape, Pipe Smokin' Brick later that year, which featured an assortment of songs from the other tapes. Downpatrick musician Ray Valentine recorded Ash's demos at his studio, Cosmic Rays. At that time, the band was known as "Genuine Real Teenagers", because they were so young when recording their early material. The demo tapes did not gain much attention at that time and the band was still playing small shows at local clubs but, in early 1994, Stephen Taverner came across the Garage Girl demo tape. Taverner put up the money to press 1,000 7-inch copies of "Jack Names the Planets" on his own LaLaLand record label. Taverner subsequently became the band's full-time manager.

Ash released the mini-album, Trailer, in October 1994, comprising seven songs. Airplay by Steve Lamacq followed on BBC Radio 1 and the debut single was followed by "Petrol" and "Uncle Pat", on their new label Infectious Records. In 1995, Ash left school and released the breakthrough singles "Kung Fu" (featured over the end credits of Jackie Chan's North American breakthrough film, Rumble in the Bronx), "Girl From Mars" and "Angel Interceptor". The movie Angus was released, which featured two Ash songs, "Jack Names the Planets" and "Kung Fu", and served to introduce Ash to American audiences.

Ash marked the end of their breakthrough year by releasing a cover of the Temptations' "Get Ready", as a limited edition red vinyl 7-inch single on Fantastic Plastic.

In 1996 the singles "Goldfinger" and "Oh Yeah" were released, with the successful album 1977 being released between these. The track "Lose Control" from that album was featured in the video game Gran Turismo. On 17 February 1997, Ash released Live at the Wireless, a live album, recorded at the Triple J Studios in Australia. A limited-edition version of the album was released in the UK on the band's own Deathstar label. In the summer of 1997, Ash played at the Glastonbury Festival, and at age 20, Hamilton became the youngest person ever to headline the festival.

=== Charlotte Hatherley, Nu-Clear Sounds and Free All Angels (1998–2004) ===
While touring with the American band Weezer, Ash felt the limitations of a three-piece format. This led to the recruitment of a second guitarist and vocalist, Charlotte Hatherley, who had previously been with the band Nightnurse. She was introduced at a few small gigs a week before the band's appearance at the V Festival in 1997. The first recording to be released with Hatherley was the single "A Life Less Ordinary", which featured on the soundtrack to the Ewan McGregor / Cameron Diaz film of the same name.

In September 1998, Ash released "Jesus Says" followed in October by the band's second album proper, Nu-Clear Sounds, and in November by "Wildsurf". The pressures of near non-stop touring of 1977 and Nu-Clear Sounds began to affect the band. In 1999, Tim Wheeler disappeared for a short while following the commercial and critical failure of Nu-Clear Sounds. He eventually emerged in New York making the self-deprecating blood-, drug- and sex-fuelled video for "Numbskull". A note for Stephen Taverner attached to the video read "I've killed Bambi".

Ash became almost bankrupt as the band prepared to release what could have been its last album. The members retreated to Wheeler's parents' house, to play and write songs in the same garage where the band began. The single "Shining Light" was released in January 2001, followed by the album Free All Angels in April. Subsequent singles released from Free All Angels were "Burn Baby Burn", "Sometimes", "Candy" and "There's a Star". The single "Shining Light" won the Best Contemporary Song award at the 2002 Ivor Novello Awards.

A new single "Envy" was released, followed shortly afterward by the singles collection Intergalactic Sonic 7″s with the bonus disk entitled Cosmic Debris. Q named Ash as No. 2 of its "50 Bands To See Before You Die".

In 2003, it was leaked to the music and tabloid press that Ash was working on a horror film described as a 'teen slasher'. The film, called Slashed, was shot while the band was on tour in America but some scenes were also shot in the UK. The screenplay, written by Jed Shepherd and directed by Alexander Marks, included star roles by Chris Martin (Sherbet Bones) and Jonny Buckland (Agent Ford) of Coldplay as a pair of FBI agents hired to track down a supernatural serial killer. Other star performances include that of Moby, James Nesbitt, Dave Grohl and Ash themselves. The film was not put on general release.

=== Meltdown and Hatherley's departure (2004–2006) ===
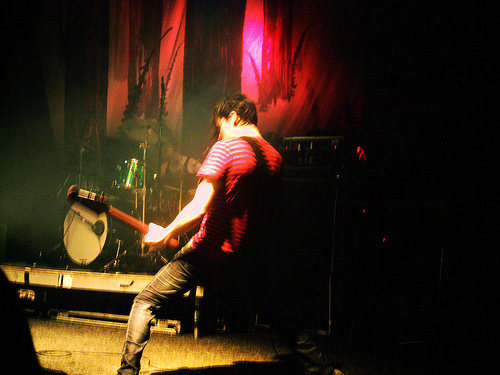
Ash playing in Dublin in 2007

On 17 May 2004, Ash released Meltdown, which reached number five in the UK. At the same time Hatherley also wrote and recorded her solo side project album Grey Will Fade. The band teamed up with LucasArts for a new Star Wars game entitled Republic Commando. "Meltdown" and "Orpheus" were part of the soundtrack for Shaun of the Dead and appeared on the in-game soundtracks for the video games NHL 2005, Burnout 3: Takedown and Midnight Club 3: DUB Edition. The song "Vampire Love" was used for American Pie Presents: Band Camp. "Starcrossed" and "Renegade Cavalcade" were later released as singles from the album. Also in 2005, Tim Wheeler received a companionship (an honorary degree) from LIPA (Liverpool Institute for Performing Arts).

On 20 January 2006, Hatherley left the band; in an interview in July 2007, the others hinted they asked Hatherley to leave as they "wanted to be a three-piece".

=== Twilight of the Innocents, A-Z Series and second Greatest Hits (2006–2011) ===
In 2006 Ash started working in a New York recording studio on what would become their first album after reverting to their original line-up, Twilight of the Innocents. A preview track, "I Started A Fire" was released in February 2007, coinciding with a full-length UK tour. The album's first physical single "You Can't Have It All" was released in April 2007, and the album itself followed the next month, along with an appearance at the Isle of Wight Festival. Two further songs from the album, "Polaris" and "End of the World", were issued as singles in June and September, respectively. Ash stated that Twilight of the Innocents would be their last album and that instead, they would only release singles as "(t)he way people listen to music has changed, with the advent of the download the emphasis has reverted to single tracks".

The original three-piece line-up played two-sold out nights at London's Roundhouse in September 2008, performing 1977 in its entirety. This was followed by the release of a 3-disc special edition version of 1977, featuring remastered and re-edited versions of the tracks, as well as tracks from Trailer and live performances from the time of its release. Ash started recording new material, which was previewed at a series of live dates in 2009. These dates coincided with the release of the single "Return of White Rabbit". This single was a precursor to Ash releasing a 7-inch single every fortnight for a whole year, starting in September 2009. Each single was simply titled by a letter, released in alphabetical order, and formed the A–Z Series. These singles would later be compiled and released together on CD. Russell Lissack, who joined the band as a live guitarist in 2010, left in early 2011. The Best of Ash compilation was released in 2011. The same year Ash collaborated with We Are Scientists to release a cover of the song "Washington Parks" by British songwriter Robert Manning, raising money and awareness for Multiple Sclerosis and The MS Society.

=== Kablammo! (2012–2016) ===
In November 2012, the band played some US dates with Weezer and went on to headline their own shows on the East Coast. They played at South by Southwest in Austin, Texas in 2013, along with seven other US cities, and supported the Smashing Pumpkins at Wembley Arena. Despite having achieved much success throughout the U.K. and Europe (among other regions) as well as extensively touring the U.S., Ash had not achieved as much success in the U.S.

After declaring in 2007 that Ash would no longer release albums, the band released the album Kablammo! in May 2015. It was preceded by the single "Cocoon", and "Free" and "Machinery" were released as follow-up singles. In December 2016 the live album Live on Mars: London Astoria 1997 was released, and supported by a tour.

=== Islands, their return to Infectious and Tav's Management (2017–present) ===
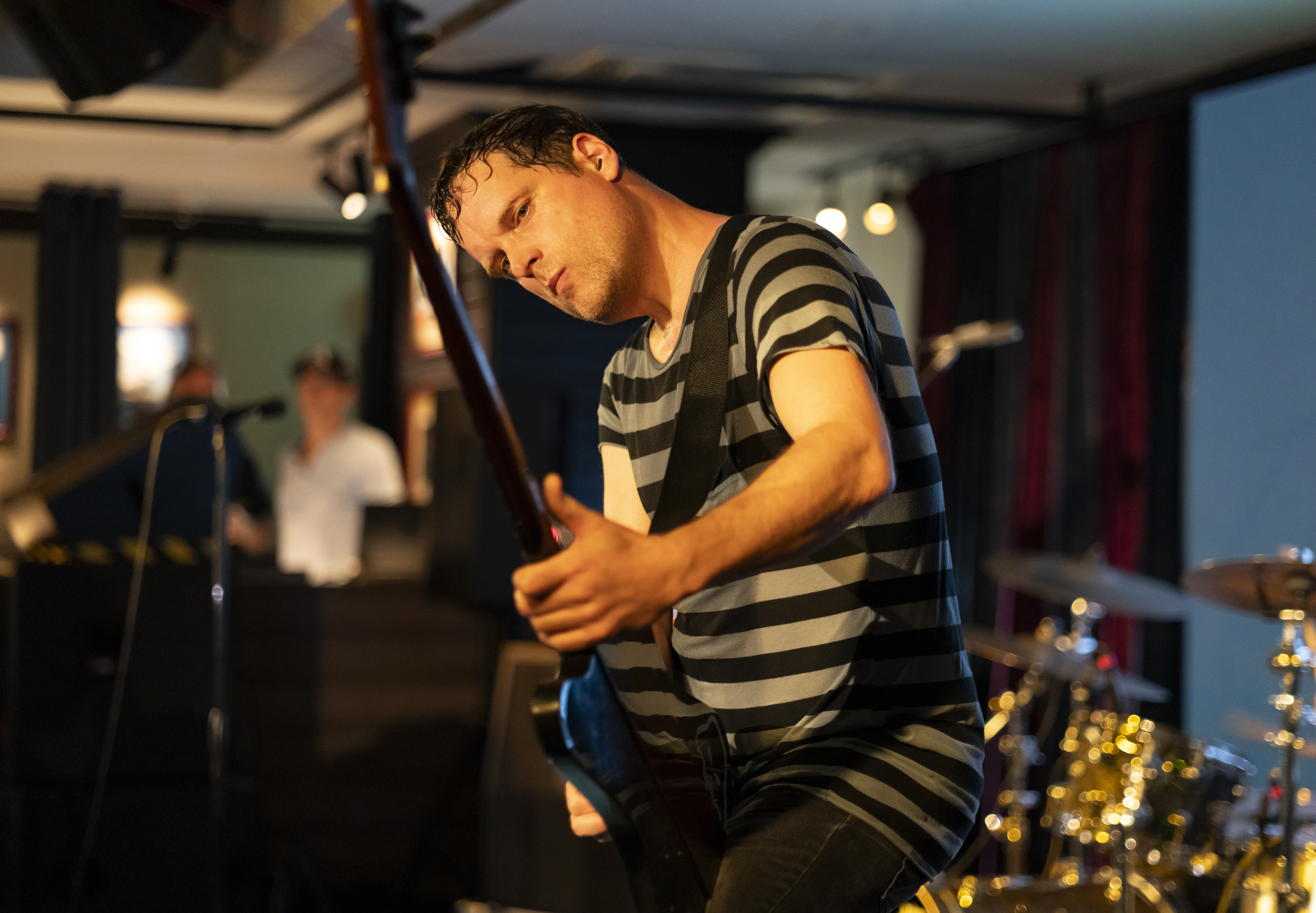
Ash (Hamilton) in Singapore in 2024

Islands was released on 18 May 2018, preceded by the single "Buzzkill", with vocals from Damien O'Neill and Mickey Bradley from the Undertones. The band released a second single, "Annabel", in April 2018, and a third, "Confessions in the Pool", in May to coincide with the album release.

On 14 June 2023, "Race the Night" was released as the first single from their upcoming album of the same name. The album was released in September 2023. "Like a God" and "Usual Places" were released as follow up singles.

In April 2025, Ash released a cover the Harry Belafonte song, "Jump in the Line". In July they announced their new album, Ad Astra, and released lead single "Give Me Back My World". The album was released in October 2025.

In September 2026, the band released "Bittersweet Blue", a previously unreleased song from the 1977 era, and announced they would be releasing a 30th anniversary edition of 1977 in October 2026.

== Band members ==
=== Current ===
- Tim Wheeler – lead vocals, guitar, keyboards, programming (1992–present)
- Mark Hamilton – bass, synthesizer (1992–present)
- Rick McMurray – drums, percussion, backing vocals (1992–present)

Former

- Charlotte Hatherley – guitar, piano, backing vocals (1997–2006; guest 2011, 2022)

=== Live ===
- Russell Lissack – guitar (2010–2011)

== Discography ==
Studio albums

- 1977 (1996)
- Nu-Clear Sounds (1998)
- Free All Angels (2001)
- Meltdown (2004)
- Twilight of the Innocents (2007)
- Kablammo! (2015)
- Islands (2018)
- Race the Night (2023)
- Ad Astra (2025)
