= Goldfinger (Ash song) =

1996 single by Ash

Single by Ash

from the album 1977
- B-side: "I Need Somebody"; "Sneaker"; "Get Ready"
- Released: 15 April 1996
- Genre: Guitar pop
- Length: 4:31
- Label: Infectious; Home Grown
- Songwriter(s): Tim Wheeler
- Producer(s): Owen Morris

Ash singles chronology
"Angel Interceptor" (1995)	"Goldfinger" (1996)	"Oh Yeah" (1996)

"Goldfinger" is a song by Northern Irish band Ash, released from their debut studio album, 1977 (1996), on 15 April 1996. The song was written by Tim Wheeler and produced by Owen Morris. It was released as a single CD, a 7-inch vinyl (the limited-edition 7-inch comes with a golden glitter clear vinyl and an accompanying picture sleeve), and as a cassette.

== B-sides ==
"Goldfinger" was released with three B-sides. The first B-side, "I Need Somebody", has a big band feel, and was written by Mark Hamilton while he was in hospital. "I Need Somebody" appears on Ash's first B-sides collection, Cosmic Debris.

The second B-side, "Sneaker", was originally titled "Easter Island" and was co-written by Mark Hamilton and Barry Peak of Backwater while Mark and Rick were involved in a side-project band called Sneaker. Sneaker (the band) featured Rick McMurray on guitar, Mark Hamilton on bass, Barry Peak on guitar and vocals, and Shaun Robinson on drums. "Easter Island" was only released on a compilation of Irish bands called Laugh Hard at the Absurdly Evil, and unlike Ash's version of the song, is slower and has clear vocals. Shortly after, Ash took "Easter Island" and recorded it, giving it the title "Sneaker." Ultimately, it is a fast-paced grunge song with roaring guitars and distorted vocals. It also appears on "Cosmic Debris". It was played live occasionally during Ash's Trailer & 1977 tours.

The CD-only track, "Get Ready" is a cover of the Smokey Robinson song and originally appeared on the fan-club release "Get Ready", released in December 1995.

== Release and reception ==
"Goldfinger" was Ash's first UK top-10 hit, peaking at No. 5 on the UK Singles Chart. It later appeared on their hits collection Intergalactic Sonic 7″s, as well as live versions that appear on "Tokyo Blitz" and "Live at the Wireless". In 1996, Tim Wheeler was quoted as saying that "Goldfinger is the best song we've ever written, and the best words I've ever written".

== Music video ==
The band were unhappy with the music video due to a lack of their involvement. It features the band playing in a basement while black-and-white shots are cut to occasionally. The video was directed by Mike Brady.

== Track listings ==
All tracks were written and composed by Tim Wheeler except where indicated.

UK and Australian CD single

1. "Goldfinger"
2. "I Need Somebody" (Hamilton)
3. "Sneaker" (Hamilton, Peak)
4. "Get Ready" (Smokey Robinson)

UK cassette and limited-edition 7-inch single

1. "Goldfinger"
2. "I Need Somebody" (Hamilton)
3. "Sneaker" (Hamilton, Peak)

== Charts ==
Chart (1996)	Peak position
Australia (ARIA)	50
Europe (Eurochart Hot 100)	29
Iceland (Íslenski Listinn Topp 40)	7
Ireland (IRMA)	13
New Zealand (Recorded Music NZ)	26
Scotland (OCC)	8
UK Singles (OCC)	5
UK Indie (Music Week)	1

== Release history ==
Region	Date	Format(s)	Label(s)	Ref.
United Kingdom	15 April 1996	7-inch vinyl; CD; cassette	Infectious; Home Grown	
Japan	18 April 1996	CD	Toy's Factory	
