= A Life Less Ordinary =

1997 romantic black comedy film

- Theatrical release poster
- Directed by: Danny Boyle
- Written by: John Hodge
- Produced by: Andrew Macdonald
- Starring: Ewan McGregor; Cameron Diaz; Holly Hunter; Delroy Lindo; Ian Holm; Maury Chaykin; Dan Hedaya; Ian McNeice; Tony Shalhoub; Stanley Tucci
- Cinematography: Brian Tufano
- Edited by: Masahiro Hirakubo
- Music by: David Arnold
- Production companies: Figment Films; Channel Four Films
- Distributed by: PolyGram Filmed Entertainment (Select territories); 20th Century Fox (International)
- Release date: 24 October 1997
- Running time: 103 minutes
- Country: United Kingdom
- Language: English
- Budget: $12 million
- Box office: $14.6 million

A Life Less Ordinary is a 1997 British romantic black comedy fantasy film directed by Danny Boyle, written by John Hodge, and starring Ewan McGregor, Cameron Diaz, Holly Hunter, Delroy Lindo, Ian Holm and Dan Hedaya. The plot follows two angels (Hunter and Lindo) who are sent to Earth to help make a disgruntled kidnapper (McGregor) and his hostage (Diaz) fall in love.

The film received mixed reviews and was unsuccessful at the box office, only grossing $14.6 million worldwide against its $12 million budget.

== Plot ==
In Heaven, angels are tasked with ensuring that mortals on Earth find love. The "Captain", Gabriel, is upset at reviewing the file of angel partners O'Reilly and Jackson, all of whose recent cases have ended in divorce or misery. He introduces a radical new incentive: if their next pair does not fall, and stay, in love (which Gabriel admits is a tough case), O'Reilly and Jackson must stay on earth forever.

Celine Naville is the spoiled twenty-something daughter of a wealthy businessman, and Robert Lewis is a janitor employed in her father's company. After being fired and replaced by a robot, Robert drowns his sorrows at a local bar. His girlfriend Lily later tells him she is leaving him for her aerobics instructor.

Believing that shared peril will bring them together, O'Reilly and Jackson pose as collection agents to repossess Robert's things and evict him from his apartment. Robert storms into Mr. Naville's office and, after wrestling a gun from a security guard, he decides to kidnap Celine. He drives her to a remote cabin in the California woods but, even though she easily slips her restraints, she decides to stick around for the adventure and for revenge against her father, suggesting that they extort a huge ransom.

The angels pose as bounty hunters and contract with Mr Naville to retrieve Celine and kill Robert. Robert's first attempt to collect the ransom fails, but Celine encourages him. They go out to a bar, get drunk and sleep together. Afterwards, Robert reveals to Celine his recurring dream where they are both on a game show and she must shoot him through the heart with an arrow.

Robert makes a second demand for the ransom, with a letter written in Celine's blood. Mr Naville gives the angels the money, and they go to meet Robert in the forest. To their disappointment, he appears willing to let Celine go in exchange for the money before O'Reilly stops his getaway.

While O'Reilly and Celine wait by their car, Jackson takes Robert into the woods to execute him. Before he can, Celine decks O'Reilly, runs into the woods, and knocks Jackson out with a shovel. As Robert and Celine drive away, O'Reilly attacks them. To escape, Robert and Celine jump from the car, which careens off a cliff, with the money still inside.

Since they are short of money, Celine decides to rob a bank. The robbery goes smoothly until a security guard shoots at her. Robert pushes her out of the way, taking a bullet in the thigh. Celine hurriedly drives him back to the city to be operated on by Elliott, a dentist who had previously proposed marriage to her. A little later, when Robert regains consciousness, he is appalled to see Celine playing a sexual role-playing game with Elliott. A fight breaks out, and Robert knocks Elliot unconscious. As they drive away, Celine explains that she agreed to Elliot's request only so that he would help Robert. Hurt, Robert gets out of the car and walks away.

To get them back together, Jackson writes a love poem in Robert's handwriting and sends it to Celine. Overcome, she runs back to Robert and says he has won her heart. The angels' plan seems to work until Robert says he did not write it. Humiliated, Celine runs out again. Robert runs after her, but is too late: the angels, believing they failed, decide to make their Earth-bound lives bearable by kidnapping Celine for ransom.

Robert tracks Celine to their hideout. He knocks O'Reilly down and, struggling with Jackson, tells Celine he loves her. The door is kicked down by Naville's butler, Mayhew, who shoots the two angels in the head. Leaving Celine locked in the trunk, Naville and Mayhew drive Robert and the two angels' bodies to the cabin, planning to fake a murder-suicide.

In Heaven, Gabriel's secretary begs him to intervene. Gabriel eventually complies and phones God. A neighbor releases Celine from the trunk and, taking his gun, she runs to the cabin and confronts her father, while Mayhew holds Robert at gunpoint. Celine shoots Mayhew in the shoulder, the bullet somehow passing through Robert's heart en route but leaving him unharmed, just as he had dreamed.

O'Reilly and Jackson later come back to life. After Gabriel congratulates them on a successful case, the two angels hold hands as they prepare to return home, suggesting they have also found love together. Robert and Celine retrieve the suitcase full of money, and with it, they settle in a castle in Scotland, shown in the animated end credits.

== Cast ==
- Ewan McGregor as Robert Lewis
- Cameron Diaz as Celine Naville
- Holly Hunter as O'Reilly
- Delroy Lindo as Jackson
- Ian Holm as Naville
- Dan Hedaya as Gabriel
- Stanley Tucci as Elliot Zweikel
- Maury Chaykin as Tod Johnson
- Tony Shalhoub as Al
- K.K. Dodds as Lily
- Ian McNeice as Mayhew
- Christopher Gorham as Walt
- Timothy Olyphant as Hiker

== Production ==
Most of the film was shot in Utah, which was chosen for its diverse locations. The scenes at the Naville mansion were filmed in Malibu, California.

== Reception ==
=== Critical response ===
A Life Less Ordinary has received mixed reviews from film critics. Rotten Tomatoes gives the film a score of 41% based on 37 reviews, with an average score of 5.7/10. The site's critical consensus states "A Life Less Ordinary has an intriguing cast and stylish work from director Danny Boyle, but they're not enough to overcome the story's fatally misjudged tonal mishmash." Metacritic, which assigns a weighted average score in the 0–100 range based on reviews from mainstream critics, calculated an average score of 37% for the film, based on reviews from 22 critics. Audiences polled by CinemaScore gave the film an average grade of "C+" on an A+ to F scale.

Andrew Johnson wrote in Time Out New York, "The outsiders' take on America that Boyle and screenwriter John Hodge bring to the film adds to its humour, as do subtle homages to other movies (including The Road Warrior, Reservoir Dogs and Raiders of the Lost Ark). Parts of Life lean toward the saccharine, and the ending could be stronger, but none of that prevents it from being one of the years' most charming date movies."

Roger Ebert gave A Life Less Ordinary 2 out of 4 stars. He described the film as a "movie that never convinces us that it needed to be made." He goes on to call the plot a mess and states that it "expends enormous energy to tell a story that is tedious and contrived."

=== Box-office performance ===
The film opened up in theatres on 24 October 1997. During its opening weekend, the film ranked 9th overall by pulling in only $2,007,279. By the end of its run, the film grossed a total of $4,366,722 in the United States. Internationally, the film made $10,345,675 for a worldwide total of $14,633,270.

== Adaptations ==
The film was serialised as a full-length comic strip within leading British comic magazine 2000 AD, adapted by then-editor David Bishop and drawn by Steve Yeowell. Screenwriter John Hodge also wrote a novelisation of the film that was published by Penguin Books (ISBN 0-14-027215-1).

Scenes from the film were used in the music video for Beck's song "Deadweight", directed by Michel Gondry; the music video for Ash's song "A Life Less Ordinary", directed by Hammer & Tongs; and the song "Don't Leave" by Faithless.

== Soundtrack ==
A Life Less Ordinary (Original Soundtrack)

Soundtrack album by various artists
- Released: October 14, 1997
- Genre: Soundtrack
- Length: 66:39
- Label: London Records

Professional ratings
Review scores
Source	Rating
AllMusic	4/5 stars
Uncut	4/5 stars

"Deadweight", a single by Beck, was nominated for Best Song from a Movie at the 1998 MTV Movie Awards.

No.	Title	Writer(s)	Artist	Length
1.	"Deadweight"	Beck Hansen / Simpson / King	Beck	6:12
2.	"Love Is Here"	Jill Cunniff	Luscious Jackson	3:00
3.	"A Life Less Ordinary"	T. Wheeler	Ash	4:18
4.	"Velvet Divorce"	Liam Howe / Chris Corner / Kelli Ali / Ian Pickering	Sneaker Pimps	4:15
5.	"Kingdom of Lies"	Lou Barlow / John Davis	Folk Implosion	4:31
6.	"Leave"	Berry / Buck / Mills / Stipe	R.E.M.	4:42
7.	"Don't Leave"	Jamie Catto / Rollo / Sister Bliss	Faithless	3:57
8.	"Oh"	Underworld	Underworld	5:50
9.	"War"	Svensson / Persson	The Cardigans	3:57
10.	"Always on My Mind"	John Christopher / Mark James / Wayne Thompson	Elvis Presley	3:39
11.	"Peace in the Valley"	Love / Tonin / Marsh / Thompson	A3 featuring Errol Thompson	5:20
12.	"Beyond the Sea"	Charles Trenet / Jack Lawrence	Bobby Darin	2:38
13.	"Put a Lid on It"	T. Maxwell	Squirrel Nut Zippers	2:40
14.	"Deeper River"	Rollo / Jamie Catto / Mark Bates	Dusted	6:09
15.	"Full Throttle"	Liam Howlett	The Prodigy	5:02
Total length:				66:39

== See also ==
- List of films about angels
