= Owen Morris =

Welsh music producer

Owen Morris (born in Glyncorrwg, Wales) was a Welsh record producer who had worked with rock bands including Oasis, the Fratellis, Ash, the View, Loso and the Verve.

== Biography ==
Morris started working in the music industry as a sound engineer at Spaceward Studio in Cambridge, England when he was 16. He continued as an engineer until 1994, when he mixed and mastered Oasis's debut album Definitely Maybe. He continued working with Oasis for their subsequent two albums (What's the Story) Morning Glory? (1995) and Be Here Now (1997). Morris appears on the cover of (What's the Story) Morning Glory? holding the album's master tape.

He went on to produce the Verve album A Northern Soul (1995), Pusherman's "Floored" (1996), Ash's 1977 (1996) and the debut UK album, For God's Sake for Thai rock star Sek Loso. In 2000, he recorded and produced Ash's album Free All Angels. He produced the Paddingtons' debut album First Comes First, which was released in October 2005 on Poptones Records. In the early summer of 2006, he produced Hats Off to the Buskers, the debut album of Dundee band the View, which reached number one on the UK Albums Chart. Morris also produced the band's second album Which Bitch? released in February 2009.

Morris mixed several tracks for the Kaiser Chiefs album The Future Is Medieval including the first single, "Little Shocks" off their last album.

In 2011, he composed and performed the soundtrack for English director Ronnie Thompson's film Tower Block. Since then, he has produced five tracks from Madness's last album and worked with the View, Towns and did a session with the unsigned band Death at Sea.

In 2013, Morris re-mastered the first three Oasis albums with Ian Cooper for 20th anniversary re-issues.

In 2014, he has mixed tracks for the Jackals, an album by the Glorious, and also recorded Italian singer Nathalie. Later in 2014, Morris produced albums for the Spanish band Stay and the American band Prehab.

In February 2015, Morris produced the debut album of Edinburgh-based rock trio Miracle Glass Company.

== Personal life ==
According to a 2020 Rolling Stone article, Morris has retired and resides in Costa Rica.
