= Tim Wheeler =

- Wheeler in Singapore in 2024

Background information
- Born: Timothy James Arthur Wheeler; 4 January 1977 (age 49); Downpatrick, Northern Ireland
- Genres: Alternative rock; punk rock; Britpop
- Occupations: Singer; songwriter; musician
- Instruments: Vocals; guitar; piano
- Years active: 1992–present
- Labels: Infectious; Warner Bros.; Atomic Heart
- Member of: Ash
- Website: ash-official.com

Timothy James Arthur Wheeler (born 4 January 1977) is a Northern Irish singer, songwriter and musician. He is the lead vocalist and guitarist of the alternative rock band Ash. He has written nearly all of Ash's notable works, such as "Oh Yeah", "Shining Light", "Girl from Mars", "Kung Fu", and "Goldfinger". In November 2014, he released his debut solo album Lost Domain.

== Early life ==
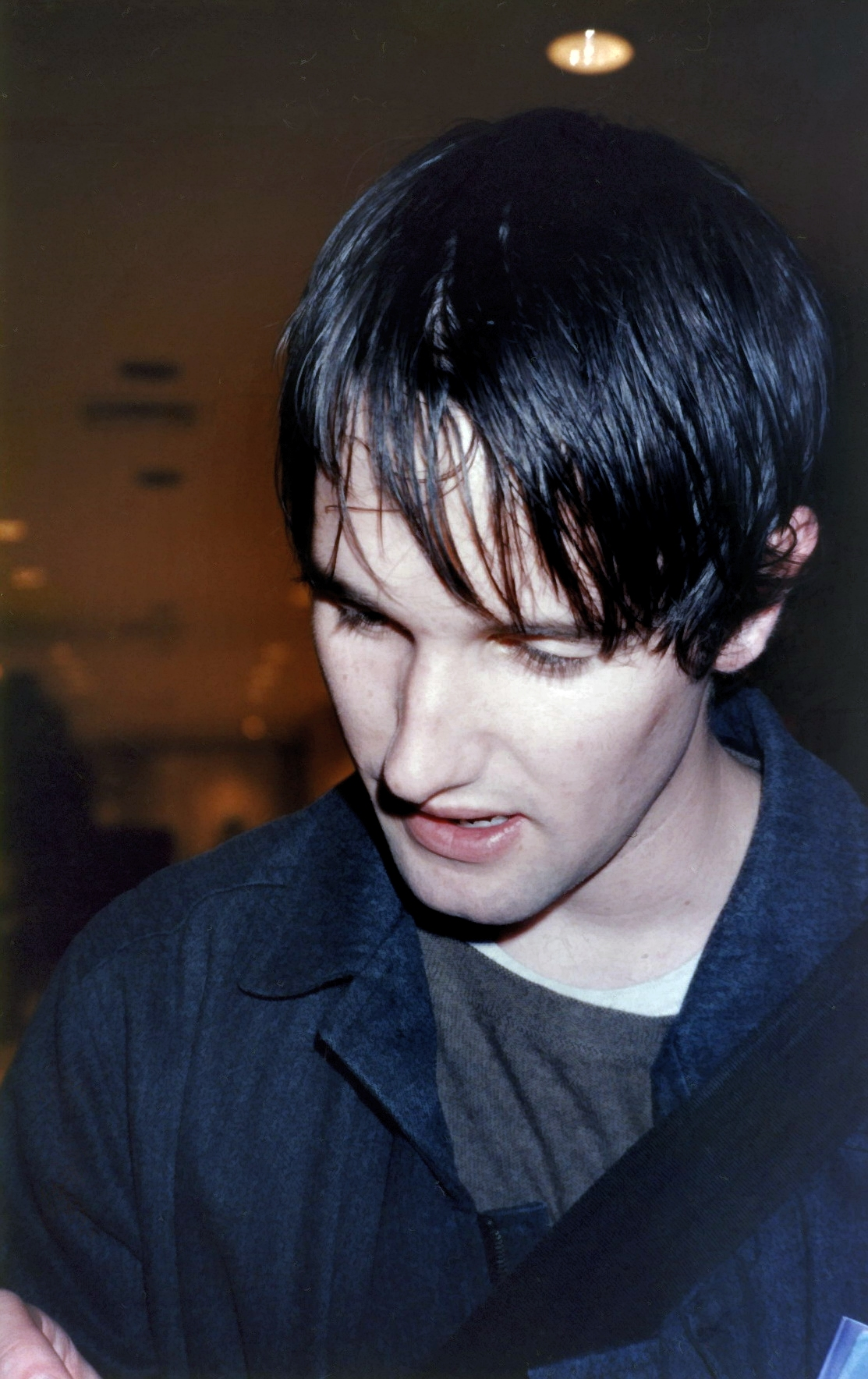
Wheeler in 1999

Timothy James Arthur Wheeler was born in Downpatrick on 4 January 1977, the son of Rosalind E. M. (née Dickson), the daughter of a Northern Bank manager, and George Bomfforde Wheeler (1932–2011), a solicitor and later judge. He is a great-great-grandson of Rev. George Bomfforde Wheeler, who was editor of The Irish Times from 1859 to 1877. He attended Down High School with his fellow band members Mark Hamilton and Rick McMurray.

== Music career ==
=== Ash ===
Wheeler won the Ivor Novello Award for Best Contemporary Pop Song in 2001 for "Shining Light".

=== Other work ===
In 1999, Wheeler contributed guitar and backing vocals on The Rentals' album Seven More Minutes. He has also contributed backing vocals Bob Geldof's Band Aid 20 2004 single "Do They Know It's Christmas?" and on Arthur Baker's song, "Glow".

As part of Channel 4's program The JD Set, Wheeler worked with Emmy The Great, The Crookes, And So I Watch You From Afar, and Ma Mentor, joining each band in covering songs by Pixies, and then performing at London's XOYO on 24 March 2011.

Wheeler has also been involved with film and TV soundtrack work, most notably Ashes (2012), Fleming: The Man Who Would Be Bond (2014) and the Shaun the Sheep Movie (2015).

=== Emmy the Great ===
Wheeler has collaborated frequently in recent years with Emma-Lee Moss, AKA Emmy The Great, the duo have performed Ash track "Tracers" on several occasions, and in 2011 Tim, Emma and Euan Hinshelwood covered Robert Manning's song "Washington Parks", the cover was released as part of a collection of covers to raise awareness of multiple sclerosis. The pair acoustically performed a set of Ash and Emmy The Great songs, as well as some covers at Willowstone Festival on 1 July 2011.

In November 2011 the pair released a Christmas album, entitled This Is Christmas (Infectious, 2011).

=== Lost Domain ===
In September 2014, Wheeler announced the release of his first solo album, Lost Domain, a heartfelt and emotional response to the loss of his father George to dementia. Lost Domain was released on Sony Red on 3 November 2014, with a portion of the proceeds being donated to The Alzheimer's Society, a charity Wheeler has worked closely with since his father's death in 2011.

Lost Domain is an album in which Wheeler battles to come to terms with his loss, charting his father's rapid decline into illness, his death and the tumultuous effect that it had on his life over the course of 11 songs. As Wheeler explains: “After losing my father to dementia, I felt the need to personally do something to fight Alzheimer’s. My friend Neil Hannon from The Divine Comedy's father also has Alzheimer's so we put on a concert in Belfast in November 2011 with The Divine Comedy, The Undertones and Ash to raise funds and awareness for the Alzheimer's Society. Since then I've had close links with The Alzheimer's Society and this year was involved with the Dementia Friends campaign. I'm proud to continue to support them and raise more awareness with the album Lost Domain."

Recorded in Ash's New York studio, Wheeler played almost everything himself, roping in musician friends when he needed a hand: Andy Burrows of Razorlight and Fred Aspelin (Alberta Cross) each played some drums; Ilan Eshkeri and Oliver Kraus helped with the string and brass arrangements performed by the London Metropolitan Orchestra; Leanne Macomber from Ejecta and Neon Indian sang; and Moon Hooch's Wenzl McGowen played saxophone. There is even a sample of Wheeler's father's piano playing on the album's epic centerpiece "Medicine".

The album track "The First Sign of Spring" is available to listen to on YouTube now.

Wheeler announced his first solo dates to support the release of the album on 4–7 November. He played Bush Hall – London, Night & Day- Manchester, ABC2 – Glasgow and Oh Yeah Centre – Belfast. In addition, he supported Andy Burrows in Amsterdam and Brussels.

== Musical style ==
=== Equipment ===
Wheeler is perhaps most recognised for using a Gibson Flying V, which he has frequently used live since 1998 onwards. His Flying V has a 1950s Zebra Coil PAF pickup, and has also been modified in the past for pyrotechnics; the Flaming Flying V acts as a flamethrower, firing from between the V part of the guitar body. Prior to this, Wheeler mainly used various Gibson Les Paul models. He also plays a Gibson SG and Gretsch Silver Jet, which was frequently used both live and in the studio since Ash's album Twilight of the Innocents. For heavier tracks such as "The Dead Disciples", Wheeler has used a Fender Telecaster. In 2011, he purchased a Gretsch 1966 Sal Fabrio, for work in the studio and rehearsals. He also uses a Gibson Custom Inspired By Kiefer Sutherland Semi-Hollow KS-336 guitar on a number of tracks live, including songs such as "Walking Barefoot". He used an Elliot Easton signature model Gibson Firebird on a number of songs during the Kablammo! tour.

Wheeler predominately uses a Mesa Boogie Road King Series II amplifier, and also sometimes uses a Mesa Boogie Dual Rectifier amplifier. He uses numerous effects pedals which are housed in a rack and controlled via MIDI. His effects pedals include; an Electro-Harmonix Micro Synthesizer, a Dunlop Crybaby 95Q Wah pedal, a Death By Audio Fuzz War, a Carl Martin HeadRoom Reverb, an Electro-Harmonix Poly Chorus, a Morpheus Droptune, a Catalinbread Karma Suture Fuzz, a Mesa Boogie Tone Burst, a Coloursound Tonebender, a Moog Moogerfooger Phaser, an ADA Flanger pedal, and a Nocto Loco octave pedal which replaced a Korg synthesiser in his effects rack. Wheeler controls his pedals in his effects rack using a Voodoo Lab Ground Control Pro MIDI foot controller.

The Flying V guitar that Wheeler set on fire on the Ash Meltdown tour is now on display at the Oh Yeah centre in Belfast. The Oh Yeah centre is dedicated to the music of Northern Ireland and was named after the song "Oh Yeah" by Ash.

=== Lyrical themes and writing ===
With the release of the band's fifth studio record Twilight of the Innocents, in 2007, Wheeler spoke of how if the group hadn't toured so heavily they would have been more prolific, that: "It would have been cool to have twice as many songs by now. I definitely could have done it, but if I go on tour I have to stop writing. Writing needs to be a relaxing process and you need peace and quiet and the right stuff around you. Whenever we take a break I could write a song every day, pretty much."

== Personal life ==
Wheeler is an Arsenal FC fan, which began during his nine-year stint living in Highbury. He has been dating French model and art director Julia Restoin Roitfeld since 2018. On September 9, 2021, they announced via Instagram that they were expecting a baby together. In February 2022, they announced the birth of their son George.

In 2005, Paul McCartney presented Wheeler a companionship from LIPA (Liverpool Institute for Performing Arts). In 2016 the Open University awarded Wheeler an honorary Doctor of the university, citing his "exceptional contribution to education and culture".

== Discography ==
Studio albums

- This Is Christmas (with Emmy the Great; 2011)
- Lost Domain (2014)
