= The Salad Way =

Studio album by Salad
- Released: 30 August 2019
- Genre: Alternative rock; indie rock
- Length: 45:52
- Label: Three Bean
- Producer: Gordon Mills Jr., Salad, Jon Clayton

Salad chronology
The Lost Album, Vol. 1 (2018)	The Salad Way (2019)

Singles from The Salad Way
- 1. "Under the Wrapping Paper" Released: 4 June 2019; 2. "You Got the Job" Released: 10 July 2019

Professional ratings
Review scores
Source	Rating
Mojo	4/5 stars
Q	3/5 stars

The Salad Way is the third studio album by English band Salad, released in August 2019 by 3 Bean Records. It is the band's first album of new material in 21 years since Ice Cream (1997).

Donald Ross Skinner, the producer behind the band's previous album, became their drummer after working with Marijne van der Vlugt and Paul Kennedy under "Salad Undressed" since 2016. They were also joined by Charley Stone, former guitarist of Gay Dad.

== Track listing ==
No.	Title	Writer(s)	Production/Mix	Length
1.	"You Got the Job"	Marijne van der Vlugt, Paul Kennedy	Gordon Mills Jr.	3:38
2.	"In the Dark"	Kennedy	Gordon Mills Jr.	3:46
3.	"Details"	van der Vlugt, Kennedy	Gordon Mills Jr.	2:20
4.	"Your Face"	Kennedy	Gordon Mills Jr.	3:13
5.	"Vadim's Slipper"	van der Vlugt, Kennedy	Gordon Mills Jr.	3:19
6.	"Merryland"	Kennedy	Gordon Mills Jr.	3:49
7.	"Welcome to My World"	Donald Ross Skinner, van der Vlugt, Kennedy	Gordon Mills Jr.	3:12
8.	"Don't Expect Things Not to Be Scary"	van der Vlugt, Kennedy, Pete Brown	Gordon Mills Jr.	5:30
9.	"Under the Wrapping Paper"	Kennedy	Gordon Mills Jr.	3:09
10.	"The Inside of My Head"	Kennedy	Gordon Mills Jr., Jon Clayton	3:25
11.	"Wayward Thinking"	Kennedy, van der Vlugt	Gordon Mills Jr., Jon Clayton	3:05
12.	"Lovesick Energy"	Kennedy	Gordon Mills Jr., Jon Clayton	3:16
13.	"Time to Escape"	Kennedy	Gordon Mills Jr., Jon Clayton	4:07
Total length:				45:52

== Personnel ==
Salad

- Marijne van der Vlugt – vocals, guitar, harmonium, percussion, piano
- Paul Kennedy – guitar, vocals, piano
- Pete Brown – bass
- Charley Stone – guitar, vocals
- Donald Ross Skinner – drums, percussion, keyboards

Production

- Gordon Mills Jr. – producer, mixing
- Jon Clayton – engineer
- Tim Topple - photography
