= New Worlds (album) =

Studio album by Charlotte Hatherley
- Released: 19 October 2009
- Studio: The Pool, London
- Genre: Indie rock; new wave; pop
- Length: 34:53
- Label: Little Sister
- Producer: Luke Smith, Adem

Charlotte Hatherley chronology
The Deep Blue (2007)	New Worlds (2009)	True Love (2017)

Singles from New Worlds
- 1. "White" Released: 3 August 2009; 2. "Alexander" Released: 11 October 2009

New Worlds is the third studio album by British musician Charlotte Hatherley, released on 16 October 2009 through her own label Little Sister Records. Following the release of her second studio album The Deep Blue in early 2007, Hatherley had started writing material for its follow-up in August of that year. Enlisting the help of producers Luke Smith and Adem, Hatherley recorded the album in one week at The Pool in London. Described as an indie rock, new wave, and pop release, New Worlds took inspiration from painters, and a book by Alex Ross.

New Worlds received generally favourable reviews from critics, with many complimenting the songwriting. "White" was released as the album's lead single on 3 August 2009, followed by the second single "Alexander" on 11 October 2009. Between the two releases, Hatherley went on a tour of the United Kingdom, and later appeared at Blissfields festival the following year.

== Background and production ==
Charlotte Hatherley released her second studio album The Deep Blue on 5 March 2007, through Hatherley's own label Little Sister Records; it marked the first release since leaving Ash a year prior. It reached number 109 on the UK Albums Chart, while the Behave appeared at number 168 and "I Want You to Know" peaked at number 108 on the UK Singles Chart. Hatherley said it did not receive as much press attention when compared to her debut studio album, Grey Will Fade (2004), and "some people didn’t get the fact it was quite diverse" stylistically. She went on tours of Europe and Japan, festival appearances, and a supporting slot for Blondie on their tour of the United Kingdom. Hatherley took a break from touring in August 2007 to write material for her next album, which she was aiming to record by the end of the year. She spent 2008 as a member of Bryan Ferry's backing band, and appeared at Ben & Jerry's festival in July 2008.

Hatherley worked on new songs in a rehearsal room, instead of taping ideas and working on a demo like she had done previously. New Worlds was recorded live over the course of a week in London, without any overdubs. Luke Smith acted as producer for the most part, save for "Wrong Notes", which was produced by Adem; Ferg Peterkin engineered the sessions. Hatherley decided if the songs did not work with simple guitar and drum arrangements, they would be scrapped. Eight songs were done in the studio at The Pool, while five were done at her home. Alan Moulder mixed the majority of the songs at Assault and Battery 1 in London, except for "Firebird" (done by Smith) and "Wrong Notes" (done by Adem); they were assisted by Darren Lawson. John Dent then mastered the album at Loud Mastering.

== Composition and lyrics ==
Musically, the sound of New Worlds has been described by critics as indie rock, new wave, and pop. Hatherley took a lot of inspiration from the book The Rest Is Noise (2007) by Alex Ross as well as painters, such as Wassily Kandinsky and Kazimir Malevich. She attempt to make a "vibrant, bright and optimistic record" that takes "action against the throwaway and bland X factor muzak you hear so much at the moment and daring to create long lasting, durable things of beauty". It incorporated more key changes and time signature alterations than her past releases. Her backing band for the album consisted of Smith on keyboards and backing vocals, Gary Kilminster on bass, and Rob Ellis on drums, keyboards, and backing vocals. Alongside these, extra musicians contributed to the recordings: Jen Marco (guitar on "New Worlds", "Colours", and "Cinnabar"); Adem (guitar on "Wrong Notes"); and Alex Thomas (drums on "Wrong Notes").

New Worlds opens with the indie disco track "White", which leads into "Alexander", a song containing synthesizers, acoustic instrumentation and a xylophone. The latter was reminiscent of the material heard on The Deep Blue, taking influence from Andy Partridge of XTC. "Straight Lines" is a riot grrrl song that sees Hatherley harken back to her teenage roots, echoing the vocal style of Karen O. The power pop "New Worlds" recalls the work of Devo, and is followed by the piano-driven "Firebird", which channels the work of Lily Allen. "Full Circle" is a Yeah Yeah Yeahs-like math rock song, and is followed by the post-punk number "Little Sahara". Hatherley said the former talked about "shapes and pure blocks of colo[u]r creating a visceral and emotional response". The art rock "Colours" gives way to "Cinnabar", which features grunge-like basslines. The album concludes with the prog-indebted "Wrong Notes", which discusses a difficult relationship.

== Release ==
In March 2009, a music video had been filmed for "White". Hatherley estimated that their next album, tentatively titled Cinnabar City, would be released around September 2009. During this time, she became a member of Bat for Lashes' backing band, a stint that lasted throughout most of the year. On 27 July 2009, New Worlds was announced for release in two months' time. "White" was released as the album's lead single on 3 August 2009, with remixes of the song as extra tracks. The following month, Hatherley embarked on a tour of the UK. "Alexander" was released as a single on 11 October 2009, with a remix of the song as an extra track. Originally scheduled for 5 October 2009, New Worlds was eventually released through Little Sister Records on 19 October 2009; it was released in the United States through Minty Fresh. In July 2010, she appeared at Blissfields festival.

== Critical reception ==
Professional ratings
Aggregate scores
Source	Rating
AnyDecentMusic?	7.2/10
Review scores
Source	Rating
AllMusic	4/5 stars
The Boston Phoenix	3.5/5 stars
DIY	7/10
musicOMH	3.5/5 stars
Pitchfork	8/10
The Skinny	4/5 stars

New Worlds was met with generally favourable reviews from music critics. AnyDecentMusic? gave it a score of 7.2, based on eight reviews.

AllMusic reviewer Jon O'Brien said New Worlds "continues to make her former band appear rather foolish, with ten tracks that cement her indie rock credentials while also establishing a more adventurous side thanks to its eclectic production". He added that it was a "confident and immediate record that shows Hatherley is going from strength to strength." BBC Music's Mike Diver saw it as her "most accomplished album yet" that was "bursting with brisling new-wave bluster, powerful sing-along friendly choruses and an apparently effortless conjuring of prickly electricity." He suggested that its only flaw being that it "doesn't linger too long in the memory". Pitchfork contributor Matthew Perpetua said it was her "most self-assured" and "most lyrically focused" release. The Skinny writer Gillian Watson noted that there was a "preoccupation with colour that lends the lyrics a vividity that's matched by the ten whipsmart pop songs which back them up".

DIY writer Lee White said it was a "pop record that's not afraid to play with the listener and that doesn't hide its idiosyncrasies", coming across as "very contemporary and yet doesn't shy away from its influences". Zeth Lundy of The Boston Phoenix wrote that the album as "a wholly satisfying guitar-pop record, chock-a-block with ruthless hooks, [and] tasty riffage". musicOMH writer Andrew Brugess saw the album as a "gem", highlighting Hatherley's "sweet and often lilting voice" as a "perfect counterpoint for her brash and destructive guitar playing". The Quietus reviewer Jeremy Allen wrote that the songs come across as "more immediate" than those heard on her previous album, signalling out her guitar abilities. The Line of Best Fit's Andrew Grillo wrote that in spite of its "frustratingly fragmented nature", the album saw Hatherley "kicking back and having fun".

== Track listing ==
All tracks written by Charlotte Hatherley.

1. "White" – 4:03
2. "Alexander" – 4:08
3. "Straight Lines" – 3:34
4. "New Worlds" – 3:44
5. "Firebird" – 2:51
6. "Full Circle" – 2:34
7. "Little Sahara" – 2:50
8. "Colours" – 3:05
9. "Cinnabar" – 4:39
10. "Wrong Notes" – 3:25

== Personnel ==
Personnel per booklet.

Musicians

- Charlotte Hatherley – vocals, guitars
- Luke Smith – keyboards, backing vocals
- Gary Kilminster – bass
- Rob Ellis – drums, keyboards, backing vocals
- Jen Marco – guitar (tracks 4, 8 and 9)
- Adem – guitar (track 10)
- Alex Thomas – drums (track 10)

Production and design

- Luke Smith – producer, mixing (track 5)
- Adem – producer (track 10), mixing (track 10)
- Ferg Peterkin – engineer
- Alan Moulder – mixing (all except tracks 5 and 10)
- Darren Lawson – mix assistant
- John Dent – mastering
- Lewes Herriot – booklet artwork
- Nick Stewart Hoyle – photography, cover design
