= Brother Brown (duo) =

Danish house music duo

Brother Brown (founded 1995 and disbanded in 2004) was a Danish house music duo, consisting of Atle Rønne Thorberg and Henrik Olsen. In the later half of the 1990s and beginning of the 2000s, Brother Brown made numerous remixes, most significantly of Madonna and of the Pet Shop Boys. Three of their remixes reached No. 1 on the Billboard Dance Chart: Madonna's "Die Another Day", Christina Aguilera's "Beautiful" and Cher's version of "When the Money's Gone".

Brother Brown's most significant release was "Under the Water" which featured Danish female folk vocalist Marie Frank. "Under the Water" reached No. 18 on the UK Singles Chart and won Brother Brown a Danish Grammy in 2000.

== Discography ==
=== Own productions ===
- Brother Brown - "Slap Me Some Skin" (1997), Yoshi-Toshi
- Brother Brown - "Where Are My Organs" (1998), Kumba
- Brother Brown - "Under the Water" (1999), FFRR/Yoshi-Toshi - UK #18
- Brother Brown - "Brotha - Brotha" (2000), Yoshi-Toshi
- Brother Brown - "Starcatching Girl" (2001), Brother Brown Records - UK #51
- Brother Brown - "Goal Setter" (2021), Stavnitser Recordings

=== Remixes ===
- Deep Dish - "Stranded" (Brother Brown's Be-Mix)
- Amira - "My Desire" (Brother Brown's Sleepless in Jylland)
- Presence - "Future Love" (Brother Brown's Love at 5 O'Clock Mix)
- Deep Dish - "Mohammad Is Jesus" (Brother Brown's Be Mix Part II)
- Gay Dad - "Joy!" (Brother Browns Daddy Cool & Brother Brown Daddy Dub)
- Danny Tenaglia - "Music Is the Answer" (Brother Brown's Bujakaffekop Mix)
- Catatonia - "Karaoke Queen" (Brother Brown's 8000 C Mix)
- Pet Shop Boys - "You Only Tell Me You Love Me When You're Drunk" (Brother Brown's Newt Mix)
- Full Intention - "I'll Be Waiting" (Brother Brown's Copenhagen Mixes)
- Film Palast - "I Want" (Brother Brown's Bananenflanke Mix)
- Örtz - "We Don't Talk" (Brother Brown Remix & Brother Brown Radio Edit)
- Madonna - "Die Another Day" (Brother Brown's Bond-Age Club)
- Christina Aguilera - "Beautiful" (Brother Brown Divine Mix & Brother Brown Mixshow)
