= Linus (band) =

English indie band

- Origin: London, England
- Genres: Indie, riot grrrl
- Years active: 1992–2005
- Labels: Elemental Records; Mole In The Ground; Bone Records
- Past members: Tammy Denitto; Jen Denitto; Andy Roberts; Peter Frost; Andy Watts; Deb van der Geugten; Andy Withey; Annie Leblond; Charley Stone
- Website: http://www.linusland.co.uk

Linus was an indie band from London, England, formed in 1992. They were integral to the early UK riot grrrl scene and considered an essential early riot grrl band.

== History ==
Linus was formed by songwriter/guitarists Jen Denitto and Andy Roberts, with vocalist Tammy Denitto and drummer Peter Frost, and played their first gigs in late 1992 after several years of rehearsals. Linus soon became involved in the London riot grrrl scene, helping to organise gigs (including the debut from Sister George), and producing zines including "Plague Your Eyes", which gained them fan and press attention. Members of the band organised riot grrrl meetings, a newsletter and a PO box, and networked with riot grrrls around the UK. On Valentine's Day 1993 they performed with riot grrrl bands Huggy Bear and Blood Sausage, the same weekend of the former band's notorious appearance on The Word; gigs followed the same year with Bikini Kill, Bratmobile, Voodoo Queens, Pussycat Trash, Skinned Teen, Frantic Spiders, Witchknot and other riot grrrl-associated bands such as Heavenly, Hole, and Scrawl, with whom they toured in September.

The first single, the "Linus" EP, was recorded by Ian Shaw and released on Jim Irvin's Bone Records in 1993, followed by a three-song contribution to four-band/double 7" compilation "Some Hearts Paid To Lie" on Wiiija. Follow up single "Super Golgotha Crucifixion Scene" was released in 1994 and made Radio 1's Evening Session single of the week; along with debut album Yougli, it was released on Elemental Records, then part of the Alternative Tentacles group. The album was well-received across the board, and rated 4/5 in Select. The same year saw an appearance at the Phoenix Festival and a small US tour.

Linus were dropped by Elemental in 1995 after the label was acquired by One Little Indian, and the next few years saw line-up changes and various unreleased recordings. Jen Denitto left in 1997, and was replaced temporarily by Charley Stone (Salad/Gay Dad) and permanently by Deb van der Geugten. Drummer Annie Leblond joined for the "Don't Forget" EP in 1998 - well-reviewed by Melody Maker - and second album Good Listener, recorded in 1999 and released in 2000, after which Andy Withey joined on drums.

2002-2004 saw Linus reinvigorated by a second wave of riot grrrl-associated music, with the band playing three Ladyfests in 2003. In 2004, the band toured to support their "P.E." EP, including gigs with We Start Fires, Zombina and the Skeletones, (hooker), and Electrelane. This period saw Linus networking with the DIY queercore scene, including shows for Local Kid (Bristol) and Homocrime (London) and gigs alongside Lesbo Pig and Wetdog.

Linus disbanded in 2005 after the sudden death of Andy Roberts. Tammy Denitto went on to play in The Dream Is Over with Stephen Lane of Vase. Jen Denitto went on to play in The Low Edges and The Monochrome Set; and has drummed with Keith Top of the Pops, Dom Green and Rebekah Delgado. Both Jen Denitto and Deb van der Geugten played in Scarlet's Well. Compilations of unreleased Linus material, and demos of songs by Andy Roberts were released in 2006; a memorial gig was held in February the same year. The 2007 book Riot Grrrl: Revolution Girl Style Now! was part-dedicated to Roberts.

In June 2015, an "Andy Roberts Retrospective" exhibition was held at the Edwardian Cloakroom in Bristol, including live music. Following on from this, former band members Jen Denitto, Deb van der Geugten and Charley Stone played a gig together, billed as The Bass Players of Linus, in February 2016. Jen Denitto released her first solo album Trustfall, in January 2018.

Linus' and Andy Roberts' albums were made available digitally in 2017.

== Discography ==
=== Albums & EPs ===
- "Linus" EP, 7", Bone, 1993
- "Super Golgotha Crucifixion Scene" EP, 7"/CDs, Elemental, 1994
- Yougli LP/CD, Elemental, 1994
- "Don't Forget" EP, CDs, Mole In The Ground, 1998
- Good Listener CD, Mole In The Ground, 2000
- "P.E." EP, CDs, Mole In The Ground, 2004
- "Exhibit E: Linus" EP, CDs, Homocrime, 2004
- The Course of True Linus Never Did Run Smooth CD, Mole In The Ground, 2006 [compilation]

=== Compilation appearances ===
- "Born Again"/"Trivia"/"Woe" on Some Hearts Paid To Lie, 2x7", Wiiija, 1993
- "Adolesce" (live at the Phoenix Festival) on Quid Deal, Cass, Melody Maker, 1994
- "Where's Billy Zoom?" on Rough Cuts, CD, Rough Trade, 1997
- "Lift Off" on Rage Against The Scene, CD, Club V, 1999
- "Lovers of London" on Joy of Incompetence, Vol 1, CD, Blue Minnow, 2004
