= The Deep Blue =

Studio album by Charlotte Hatherley
- Released: 5 March 2007
- Recorded: 2006
- Studio: The Red House, Senigallia, Italy; Miloco, London
- Genre: Post-punk, power pop
- Length: 53:18
- Label: Little Sister
- Producer: Eric Drew Feldman; Rob Ellis; Charlotte Hatherley

Charlotte Hatherley chronology
Grey Will Fade (2004)	The Deep Blue (2007)	New Worlds (2009)

Singles from The Deep Blue
- 1. "I Want You to Know" Released: 26 February 2007; 2. "Siberia" Released: 14 May 2007; 3. "Again" Released: 28 October 2007

The Deep Blue is the second studio album by English musician Charlotte Hatherley, released on 5 March 2007 under Hatherley's own label Little Sister Records. She left Ash in January 2006; she visited Australia, where she stayed for two months, and wrote 17 new songs. After contacting Eric Drew Feldman, recording sessions were held at The Red House Studio in Senigallia, Italy, and Miloco Studios in London, with Feldman, Rob Ellis and Hatherley acting as producers. Described as a post-punk and power pop album, The Deep Blue saw Hatherley's guitarwork being sidestepped, allowing more of an emphasis on other instruments, such as bass, strings, and piano.

The Deep Blue received mixed reviews from critics, some seeing it as an improvement on her debut, while others felt the songs lacked potential. The album charted at number 109 in the United Kingdom. The Behave EP peaked at number 168 on the UK Singles Chart, followed by the lead single "I Want You to Know" at number 108. The EP was released in December 2006, preceding the release of "I Want You to Know" on 26 February 2007. She went on tour in the UK in February and March 2007, followed by the second single "Siberia" on 14 May 2007. Over the next few months, Hatherley played a series of headlining and festivals shows, as well as supporting Blondie on their UK tour. "Again" was released as the third single on 28 October 2007.

== Background and production ==
Since 1997, Charlotte Hatherley was the guitarist for Ash. In 2004, as the band were in the process of recording their fourth studio album Meltdown, Hatherley set out to record a solo album concurrently. Dubbed Grey Will Fade, Hatherley's debut studio album appeared in August 2004. It peaked at number 51 in the United Kingdom. Two of the album's singles – namely, "Summer" and "Bastardo" – both reached number 31 on the UK Singles Chart. Hatherley toured in support of the album a month after its release, which she was able to only due to Ash taking a break from shows. On 20 January 2006, Hatherley left the band. Ash frontman Tim Wheeler stated that it was the band's decision for Hatherley to leave, as she wished to be a solo artist while also remain in the band, where he "could tell her heart wasn't in it". Shortly afterwards, Hatherley travelled to Australia for her sister Beatrice's wedding, where she ended up staying for two months. Here, she had accumulated 17 songs for her next album.

After contacting Eric Drew Feldman, who had previously produced Grey Will Fade, she flew to San Francisco, California to meet with him. Feldman, Rob Ellis, and Hatherley served as the producers throughout the recording. The majority of the songs were recorded at The Red House Studio in Senigallia, Italy, except for "Cousteau" and "Again", which were done at Miloco Studios in London. Choosing to work in Italy, Hatherley said Ellis was aware of a residential studio in the countryside, which enabled them to record without any distractions. David Lenci acted as the main engineer with assistance from Mano Moccia and Andreas Venetis; "Cousteau" and "Again" were engineered by Finn Eiles. Ben Hillier mixed the majority of the recordings at Miloco in June 2006, with assistance from Fergus Peterkin. Al Clay and Feldman mixed "Siberia" at Westside Pacific Music, while "Cousteau" was mixed by Ellis and Hatherley. John Dent then mastered the album at Loud in Taunton. Sessions lasted for three months, in contrast to the two weeks for Grey Will Fade.

== Composition and lyrics ==
Musically, the sound of The Deep Blue has been described by critics as post-punk and power pop. The "dreaminess" of the Cocteau Twins, as well as the "whimsical romanticism" of Kate Bush, earned it a comparison to Air. Hatherley said the guitarwork "takes more a backseat", allowing other instruments, such as brass, strings, and piano to be heard more. The majority of the vocals, guitars, bass, drums, and keyboard parts were done by the trio of Hatherley, Feldman and Ellis. A number of additional musicians contributed to the recordings: Toby MacFarlaine (bass on "Cousteau" and "Again"); Osymyso (samples on "Be Thankful"); Josh Klinghoffer (drums on "I Want You to Know" and "Very Young"); Calina de la Mare (violin on "Again"); Renato Pignieri (trombone on "Wounded Sky"); Terry Edwards (trumpet on "Behave" and "Very Young", saxophone on "Behave", "Love's Young Dream", and "Very Young"); Martina Celli (viola on "Roll Over (Let It Go)"); Andrea Leopardi (violin on "Roll Over (Let It Go)"); Jasser Merlet Valdes (trumpet on "Dawn Treader"); and Dave McCracken (programming).

The Deep Blue opens with the instrumental song "Cousteau", which channels the sound of Echoes (1971) by Pink Floyd. The bassline in "Be Thankful" was reminiscent of the one heard in "Come Together" (1969) by the Beatles. The pop-punk track "I Want You to Know" recalled the work of Toyah Willcox, while "Again" was compared to Morcheeba with its orchestral tone. "Wounded Sky" features bongos and calypso guitarwork, and is followed by "Behave", which uses staccato guitar parts. Hatherley said the latter was influenced by Secretary, where James Spader's character appeared "so sexy in it, and at the same time so vulnerable". "Roll Over (Let It Go)" starts off quietly, before eventually giving way to a wall of sound. "Very Young" evokes the sassy nature of the Shangri-Las, and was written about Hatherley losing her virginity to a man in his 40s while she was still a teenager. "Dawn Treader" is a reference to the 1952 book of the same name. It was co-written with Andy Partridge of XTC; Hatherley's song publishers set her up with him after learning that he enjoyed Grey Will Fade. The album closes with the mini-suite "Siberia", which was Hatherley said came out in the vein of David Bowie and Pixies.

== Release ==
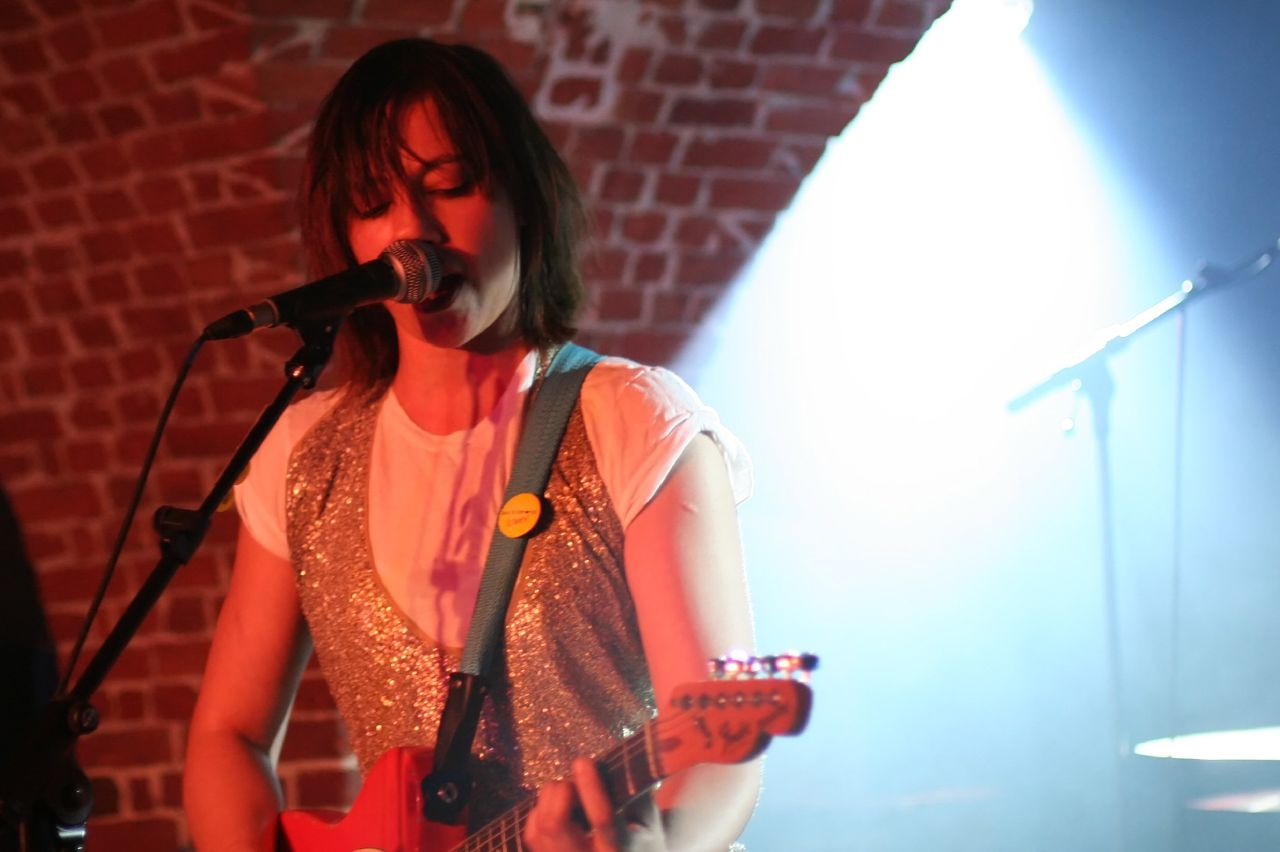
Charlotte Hatherley performing in Europe.

On 24 November 2006, The Deep Blue was announced for release in early 2007. The EP Behave was released on 18 December 2006; it consisted of "Mr. Ed", a longer version of "Cousteau" and a remix of "Behave" that Smith made. The music video for "Behave" was posted online on 3 January 2007. "I Want You to Know" was released as a single on 26 February 2007. The song's animated music video, directed by Joe Cornish of Adam and Joe, features Hatherley in a boxing ring. She said the lyrics were "quite comic book-ish", with Cornish wanting to something with manga. In February and March 2007, she went on a tour of the UK, with support from Shuffle, which featured Hatherley's sister Beatrice. Her backing band consisted of guitarist Luke Smith, bassist John Clayton, drummer Stuffy, keyboardist Angie Pollock, and multi-instrumentalist Jen Marco.

The Deep Blue was released through Hatherley's own label Little Sister Records on 5 March 2007. She had no success finding a label to put the album out, so she opted to found her own with her manager Ann-Marie Shields. "Siberia" was released as a single on 14 May 2007; the CD version featured "Last Night", "This Is Pop", and a remix of "Siberia" as extra tracks. Following this, Hatherley embarked on tours of Europe and Japan. She played a handful of headlining and festivals shows in June and July 2007, prior to supporting Blondie on their UK tour, and appearing at the Reading and Leeds Festivals. Hatherley went on an acoustic tour of the UK in September and October 2007. "Again" was released as a single on 28 October 2007, with an acoustic version of the song as an extra track.

== Reception ==
Professional ratings
Review scores
Source	Rating
AllMusic	3/5 stars
DIY	7/10
Drowned in Sound	6/10
Gigwise	7/10 stars
The Guardian	3/5 stars
NME	7/10
Pitchfork	7.8/10
Playlouder	3.5/5 stars
RTÉ	3.5/5 stars
The Skinny	2/5 stars

The Deep Blue was met with mixed reviews from music critics. DIY's Stuart McCaighy saw the "production quality and the artistic freedom" as an improvement on her debut. He said Hatherley had "grown as a songwriter", with the album displaying "purity of heart at work". AllMusic reviewer Alan Severa said the album "decidedly veer[s] away" from acts that influenced her debut, "show[ing] a self-assured Hatherley setting up a panorama of unique song compositions". Dan Martin of NME wrote that there was a "dense richness" to the majority of the material that "reveals more tricks and truths the longer you navigate." Pitchfork contributor David Raposa referred to the album as a "trainspotter's nirvana", with Hatherley's influences on full display, as all "these little moments, vocally and musically, come off as nods and respectful homages instead of outright thefts". The Guardian contributor Betty Clarke considered it "[h]igh on introspection and atmospherics", with Hatherley using the sea as a "metaphor for her fluctuating insecurities."

Daniel Ross of Drowned in Sound wrote that the album "never fully takes off", with the absence of "a fucking great single," while some of its songs were a "little dull and lacking in charm". Gigwise writer Jeff Ando said that a lot of the album "floats over you and at times drifts into the worrying genre of 'mood music'". Though, "when it does show its teeth, such as on 'I Want You To Know' or the excellent 'Very Young', there is great pogoing potential". Anne-Louise Foley of RTÉ said the album was "full of promise", albeit "[a]t times patchy". She added that it "might not make the massive splash Hatherley was hoping for", though it could "undoubtedly lead to greater waters." Playlouder's Jeremy Allen wrote that in spite of the album's bigger production value, it still had the same issue that Hatherley had on her debut, the lack of song quality. He exaplined that in her "bid to write a cogent and credible second album, she's maybe toiled a smidgen too hard, thus rendering some of it confused or lacking appeal". The Skinny writer Billy Hamilton was highly critical of the album, calling it "aimless and cluttered", with "little else here match[ing the] carefree ambition" of "I Want You to Know".

The Deep Blue reached number 109 on the UK Albums Chart. On the UK Singles Chart, Behave appeared at number 168, followed by "I Want You to Know" at number 108.

== Track listing ==
All tracks written by Charlotte Hatherley, except "Dawn Treader" by Hatherley and Andy Partridge.

1. "Cousteau" – 1:51
2. "Be Thankful" – 5:23
3. "I Want You to Know" – 2:43
4. "Again" – 4:21
5. "Wounded Sky" – 3:37
6. "Behave" – 4:02
7. "Love's Young Dream" – 4:04
8. "Roll Over (Let It Go)" – 4:24
9. "Very Young" – 2:53
10. "Dawn Treader" – 4:01
11. "It Isn't Over" – 3:19
12. "Siberia" (includes hidden track "Lost in Time") – 12:40

== Personnel ==
Personnel per booklet.

Musicians

- Charlotte Hatherley – vocals, guitar, bass (tracks 6, 9, 11 and 12), keyboards (tracks 8 and 10) arranger
- Toby MacFarlaine – bass (tracks 1 and 4)
- Eric Drew Feldman – keyboards (all except track 4), bass (tracks 3, 5, 7 and 8), backing vocals (track 8), arranger
- Rob Ellis – keyboards (tracks 1, 2, 4–7 and 10–12), percussion (track 1), drums (all except tracks 1 and 10), backing vocals (tracks 2, 3, 5, 7–9 and 11), arranger
- Osymyso – samples (track 2)
- Josh Klinghoffer – drums (tracks 3 and 9)
- Calina de la Mare – violin (track 4)
- Renato Pignieri – trombone (track 5)
- Terry Edwards – trumpet (tracks 6 and 9), saxophone (tracks 6, 7 and 9)
- Martina Celli – viola (track 8)
- Andrea Leopardi – violin (track 8)
- Jasser Merlet Valdes – trumpet (track 10)
- Dave McCracken – programming

Production and design

- Eric Drew Feldman – producer, mixing (track 12)
- Rob Ellis – producer, mixing (track 1)
- Charlotte Hatherley – producer, mixing (track 1)
- David Lenci – engineer
- Mano Moccia – assistant
- Andreas Venetis – assistant
- Finn Eiles – engineer (tracks 1 and 4)
- Ben Hillier – mixing
- Fergus Peterkin – assistant
- Al Clay – mixing (track 12)
- John Dent – mastering
- Karl Bolander – design
- Marius W Hansen – photography
- Duncan McKellar – painting

== Charts ==
Chart performance for The Deep Blue
Chart (2007)	Peak position
UK Albums (OCC)	109
