= Drink Me (Salad album) =

Studio album by Salad
- Released: 15 May 1995
- Studio: Britannia Row
- Genre: Britpop
- Length: 47:37
- Label: Island
- Producer: Mark Freegard

Salad chronology
| Singles Bar (1994) | Drink Me (1995) | Ice Cream (1997) |

Singles from Drink Me
- 1. "Your Ma" Released: July 1994; 2. "Drink the Elixir" Released: March 1995; 3. "Motorbike to Heaven" Released: May 1995; 4. "Granite Statue" Released: September 1995

Drink Me is the first studio album by English Britpop band Salad, released in May 1995, a year after their compilation of singles and B-sides Singles Bar.

== Recording ==
The album was recorded at Britannia Row studios and was produced by Mark Freegard who had previously worked with the Breeders. Singer and keyboard player van der Vlugt describes the recording process as having been difficult and the band needing to "dig deep".

== Artwork ==
All photographs (including the cover and rear sleeve) were taken by documentary photographer Martin Parr who accompanied the band on a ferry trip. The CD booklet devotes a page to the lyrics of each track, together with an accompanying photograph.

== Release ==
The album was released in May 1995 through Island Records, shortly after the release of the single "Motorbike to Heaven" which peaked at No. 42 on the charts and in the process became the band's highest-charting single. Prior to this, the tracks "Your Ma" and "Drink the Elixir" had been released as singles, the former as a triple A-side together with "Plank" and "Open". The final single released from the album was "Granite Statue".

== Reception ==
Professional ratings
Review scores
| Source | Rating |
|---|---|
| AllMusic | 4/5 stars |
| Select | 3/5 |

Drink Me reached number 16 in the UK album charts. A contemporary review in Select by Roy Wilkinson reserved particular praise for the first two tracks, describing them as "invigorating blasts".

== Track listing ==
Writing credits per booklet.

| No. | Title | Writer(s) | Length |
|---|---|---|---|
| 1. | "Motorbike to Heaven" | Paul Kennedy | 4:11 |
| 2. | "Drink the Elixir" | Rob Wakeman | 4:26 |
| 3. | "Granite Statue" | Kennedy | 3:13 |
| 4. | "Machine of Menace" | Marijne van der Vlugt | 3:26 |
| 5. | "Overhear Me" | Wakeman | 2:37 |
| 6. | "Shepherds' Isle" | Kennedy | 2:57 |
| 7. | "Muscleman" | Vlugt | 3:48 |
| 8. | "Your Ma" | Vlugt | 3:16 |
| 9. | "Warmth of the Hearth" | Kennedy | 3:27 |
| 10. | "Gertrude Campbell" | Kennedy | 1:55 |
| 11. | "Nothing Happens" | Kennedy | 3:27 |
| 12. | "No. 1's Cooking" | Vlugt | 3:27 |
| 13. | "A Man with a Box" | Kennedy | 3:30 |
| 14. | "Insomnia" | Wakeman | 3:18 |
| Total length: | | | 47:37 |

== Personnel ==
Personnel per booklet.

Salad

- Marijne van der Vlugt – vocals, keyboards
- Paul Kennedy – guitar, vocals
- Rob Wakeman – drums, samples
- Pete Brown – bass

Production

- Mark Freegard – producer, mixing
- Martin Parr – photographs
- DesignPig – design

== Chart performance ==
| Chart (1995) | Peak position |
|---|---|
| UK Albums (OCC) | 16 |
