= The Wimmins' Institute =

Indie rock band (2015-2017)

- Origin: London, England
- Genres: Indie, riot grrrl
- Years active: 2015–2016
- Past members: Cassie Fox; Jennifer Denitto; Deb van der Geugten; Melissa Reardon
- Website: http://wimmins.wordpress.com

The Wimmins' Institute was a four-piece all-female indie rock band from London, England, formed in 2015.

The band was formed by Jennifer Denitto on drums/guitar, Cassie Fox on bass guitar, Melissa Reardon on trumpet/drums, and Deborah van der Geugten on guitar. All four members provided vocals.

Fox and Reardon also played together in Socialist R&B band Thee Faction; Denitto and van der Geugten had both been members of riot grrrl band Linus. Reardon and Denitto also play in Keith Top of the Pops & His Minor UK Indie Celebrity All-Star Backing Band.

The group played their first gig in 2015 and subsequently played with Grace Petrie, the Ethical Debating Society, Vice Squad, the Monochrome Set and Bis.

Their debut album, Badass Lady Power Picnic, produced by Charley Stone, was self-released in October 2015. It was rated 4/5 by R2, who described it as "just wonderfully, tunefully, angrily unprofessional". The Morning Star described it as a "brilliant debut". Tracks from the album, including lead single "Mansplaining", have been played by Steve Lamacq on BBC Radio 6.

In 2016 the band released the new song "Nando's" as a single, with accompanying video.

In 2017, the group split, with Fox continuing with new band Guttfull, and Reardon continuing with Foxcunt. Denitto and van der Geugten later joined Argonaut. Denitto, Reardon and WI 'fifth member' Charley Stone also play in The Fallen Women.

== Discography ==
- "Mansplaining", DL single (2015)
- "Let It Go On Another Planet", DL single (2015)
- Badass Lady Power Picnic, CD album (2015)
- "Nando's", DL single (2016)
