= Sister George =

English queercore band

- Origin: London, UK
- Genres: Queercore, riot grrrl
- Years active: 1993–1996
- Label: Catcall Records
- Spinoffs: Nightnurse
- Past members: Ellyot Dragon; Lisa Cook; Daryl Stanislaw; Lyndon Holmes

Sister George were an English band from London, recognised as being significant in the 1990s queercore scene, who formed in 1993.

== Naming, genre and lineup ==
The group's name was inspired by the 1968 film The Killing of Sister George, which was an adaptation of the play of the same name. Although singer Ellyot called the film "stereotypical and obviously written by a man" she loved Beryl Reid calling her a "dyke heroine". Although queer punk bands had existed in the UK in the 1980s, such as The Apostles/Academy 23, No Brain Cells and Tongue Man (early 1990s), Sister George were one of the first queercore identified UK bands. The members were Lisa Cook on bass, Daryl Stanislaw on drums, Lyndon Holmes on guitar and vocals, and Ellyott on lead vocals and guitar.

== History ==
=== First gig and album ===
Sister George's first gig was at the Girlygig club night organised by Jen from Linus in 1993.

Their album, Drag King, came out on Catcall Records in 1995, which was run by Liz Naylor. It was re-released in the U.S. by Outpunk Records, and a music video for the song "Handle Bar" was made. This song also appeared on the Outpunk Records compilation, Outpunk Dance Party.

Also featured on Drag King was a hardcore style cover of the Tom Robinson song "Glad to Be Gay", but renamed "100 X No!". The Sister George version featured the voice of serial killer Aileen Wuornos, and the band chanting, "We kill in self defence". Tom Robinson at a gig in London's Club V (an alternative queer club, in the mid '90s) introduced his song by saying, "I'm now going to sing a Sister George cover".

=== Media attention and touring ===
The band found themselves heralded in the pages of British music magazines such as the NME. In one interview with the NME, Sister George were asked about other UK queercore bands they gave a fake list. Caroline Sullivan also wrote about Sister George a number of times in The Guardian newspaper, which encouraged criticism from mainstream gay culture.

Sister George toured with acts like Huggy Bear and Hissyfit at first, but soon they were joined by other queer bands such as Mouthfull, Six Inch Killaz and Children's Hour, and it was these groups that did pioneer a queercore scene in the UK.

== Relevance in gay culture ==
Label owner Naylor said of the band's relation to mainstream gay culture, "To me, the gay lifestyle is getting to be like just another alternative lifestyle. You go down Old Compton Street in Soho and see them sitting there in nice coffee bars with their pink pounds - and these (Sister George) are 20-year-old kids who are angry and on the dole." The band believed that queercore was a necessity for queer people who were too poor to participate in what had become a commercial scene in places such as Old Compton Street in the 1990s.

Bassist Lisa Cook acknowledged Riot Grrrl as opening up the possibility of Queercore for Sister George saying "Sister George started off in the riot grrrl scene. That opened a door for Queercore by creating a climate where loads of young girls could go to gigs which you couldn't do before".

The band would often enthusiastically say "Queercore is an attitude problem". Their queer identity although front and centre in their music, still they did not wish to be pigeonholed or enjoyed only because they were queer, with Ellyot saying "I don't want the whole world to buy our records because I'm a dyke, I want them to buy our records 'cos we're brilliant!"

The band toured with Tribe 8 on a 3 date UK tour.

== Breakup ==
The band broke up in the midst of recording their second album. Their last gig was on 29 October 1994 at legendary gay pub The Bell on Pentonville Road, London.

== Interviews and film ==
Sister George performed in and are interviewed in the film She's Real, Worse Than Queer by Lucy Thane. Also the Video Zine Getting Close To Nothing (1994) featured a live recording of a song Virus Envy, reused in the feature length Rebel Dykes film. The band were also in OUT magazine 's short film Pull Your Finger Out with another lesbian band Atomic Kandy.

Ellyott was interviewed for the book Never Mind the Bollocks: Women Rewrite Rock by Amy Raphael (Virago Press, 1995) and What Is She Like: Lesbian Identities from the 1950s to the 1990s by Rosa Ainley (Continuum, 1995; republished 2016).

== Other bands ==
Ellyott was the main singer and song writer of Israeli band Pollyanna Frank, a prominent Israeli alternative band; she was also drummer of The Darlings, a band which included Lesley Woods (formerly of the post punk band Au Pairs) and Debbie Smith (later in Curve and Echobelly).

After Sister George, Ellyott went on to form Nightnurse which featured then 16-year-old Charlotte Hatherley on guitar, who would later have success with the band Ash. Daryl drummed for The Element Of Crime with Chris and Jo from Huggy Bear, Layla from Skinned Teen, Dale from Blood Sausage and Andy from Linus, releasing the single "The things we do for love...". Also after Sister George, Lyndon and Lisa had a short running band called Kidnapper.

Lisa Cook died in 2008. Ellyott moved back to Israel where she is now a radio DJ.

== Line up ==
- Ellyott (vocals/guitar)
- Lisa Cook (bass)
- Lyndon Holmes (guitar/vocals)
- Daryl Stanislaw (drums)

== Discography ==
- Drag King (1994)
