= Fallingice =

Italian rock trio

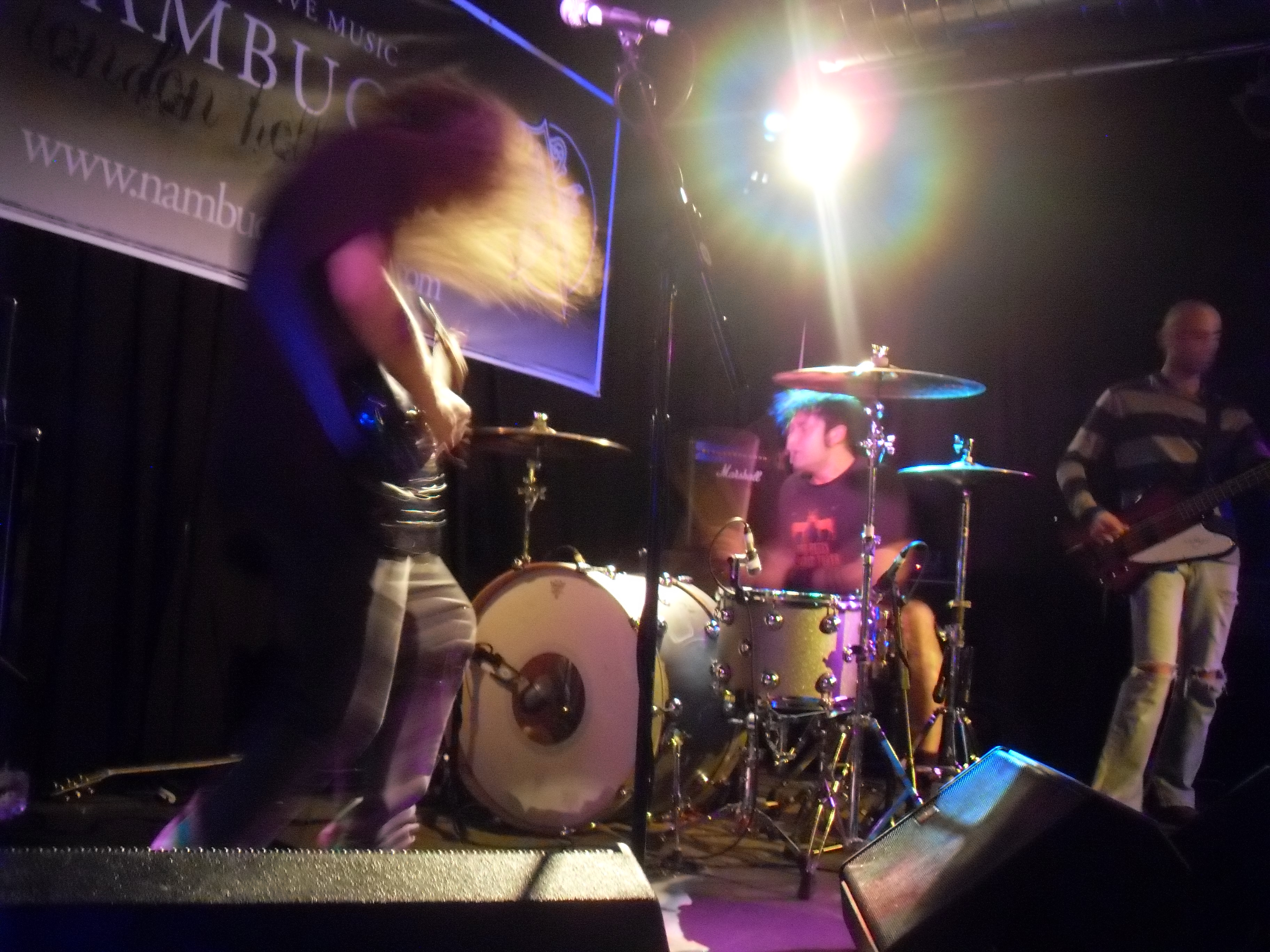
- Fallingice – Live @ Nambucca, London 2011

Background information
- Origin: Italy
- Genres: Alternative rock Grunge; Alternative metal
- Years active: 1999 – present
- Labels: Ukdivision Records; Roadrunner Records Belgium
- Members: Vice: Vocals and guitars Bem: Bass; Fab: Drums
- Website: Official website

Fallingice are an Italian powerful and energetic rock trio born in late 1999 on initiative of the singer and guitarist Vice. The name of the band derives from the mysterious phenomenon of large chunks of ice falling down on the ground out of the blue sky, which is known collectively as "Falling Ice", connected to the UFOs phenomena. Alex Henderson, American journalist for Billboard, Spin and All Music Guide, wrote that Fallingice "can be relevant to both alternative hard rock and alternative metal, although 90% of the time their debut album Meatsuit is post-grunge rather than alt-metal."

== History ==
=== First achievements ===
In 2001 Fallingice won the well-known Italian musical contest Coop for music with the song "Another day", printed in 15.000 copies and sold together with the magazine Rockstar and in big stores all over Italy. Shortly afterwards they played at M.E.I. in Faenza, one of the most important events dedicated to the new Italian music scene. In the following years Fallingice performed shows throughout Italy and topped the Rock charts of Vitaminic.com in America, Germany, England, France and other European countries.

=== Lymph EP and new formation ===
In early 2006 they entered the studio to record their first EP Lymph, co-produced by Red House Recordings (Steve Albini, Michael Davis, Josh Klinghoffer, Rob Ellis, Charlotte Hatherley, Linea 77). After the recording, while they were looking for a record label to publish their work, long time bassist Gabriele Barone had a serious health problem and therefore was forced to leave the band. A few months later followed the departure of then-drummer Calabria. In 2007 singer-songwriter Vice, after many auditions, recruited Bem on bass and Fab on drums, who had been playing with other bands of the Italian underground scene. The band that had already changed its line-up various times during the years, took its current shape.

=== Record deal and debut album Meatsuit ===
The new enthusiasm, shared intentions and common musical influences gave new life to Fallingice that signed a record deal with Ukdivision Records, an indie label based in the UK, for the release of their debut album Meatsuit in July 2010 with a worldwide distribution.

The album was produced by Alessandro Paolucci (Raw Power) and Fallingice at West Link Recordings in Pisa, Italy, mixed by David Lenci (Uzeda, Charlotte Hatherley, One Dimensional Man) at Red House Recordings and mastered at Precision Mastering in Hollywood, California, by Tom Baker (Helmet, Nine Inch Nails, Marilyn Manson, Deftones, Alter Bridge).

=== Roadrunner distribution ===
In November 2010 the band announced that Meatsuit was distributed and promoted in Benelux by the famous Roadrunner Records Belgium thanks to the excellent feedback received from national and foreign press and that they were among the first Italian groups to be distributed by Roadrunner in collaboration with the agency Alkemist Fanatix Europe.

=== "Breathing Machine" video release ===
Fallingice first official video "Breathing Machine", shot by Carlo Roberti of Solobuio Visual Factory (Dope Stars Inc., Nachtmahr, L'Âme Immortelle), was "Video of the week" on Rock TV Italy and also broadcast on the Australian National TV ABC on the music program Rage and in Usa.

=== European dates ===
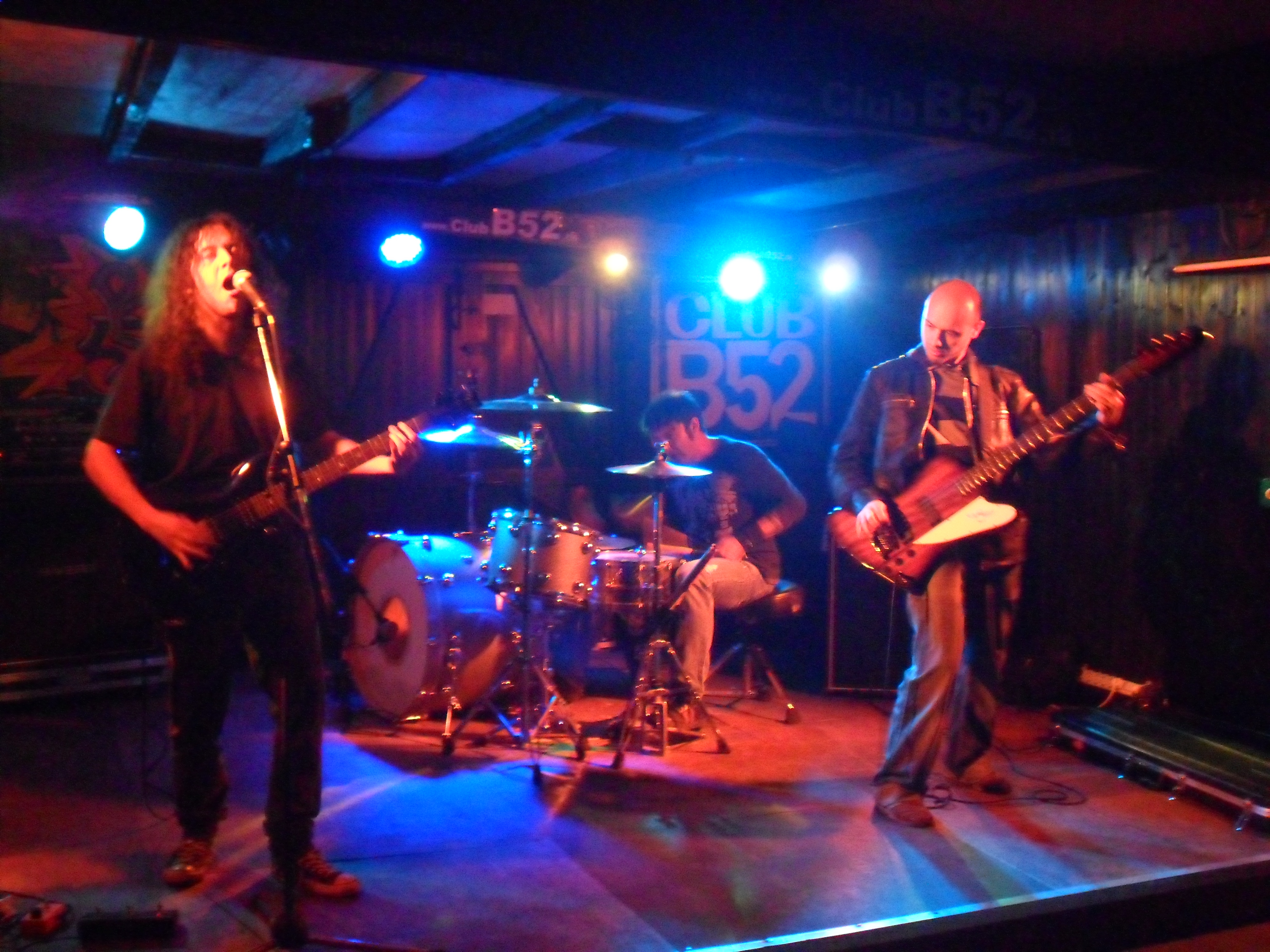
Fallingice performing live in Belgium (2011)

In the Spring of 2011 the band played some shows in London, Amsterdam and Eernegem (Belgium) to promote the album.

=== 2012 ===
They're currently writing new material for the next album.

== Press quotes ==
- "Beware of Fallingice because this act will leave its mark on you, make no mistake about it." Dan MacIntosh (Journalist for Spin, Paste, CMJ)
- "With Meatsuit, Fallingice has managed to sustain numerous melodies throughout their songs without diminishing the impact of their rough, metal edges, something that many heavy rock bands fail to create." 4 stars (out of 5) Alec Cunningham (Journalist for Blank Newspaper, Exposed)
- "Fallingice aren't as slick or polished a post-grunge band as Creed, 3 Doors Down or Nickelback, and while angst-ridden tracks such as "Soap Bubble", "Inner Confusion", "Hands in Chains", "Desired" and "Another Day" are radio-friendly, they also show a fondness for the type of explosive fury that Nirvana favored back in the early 1990s. Those songs have melody and nuance, but they are also decidedly edgy." Alex Henderson (Journalist for Billboard, Spin, The L.A. Weekly, All Music Guide)
- "Fallingice means alternative rock like a shot. It means a crystal clear post-grunge sound. Untouched, pristine, pure. It means an album born out of granite. It means not being a prisoner of time. 'Meatsuit' sounds fresh. A stab in the chest. Huge record of its kind. Stunning album out of all genres." Emanuele Tamagnini (Nerdsattack.net)
- "It rarely happens that an Italian group of alt-rock gets signed by an English indie label and sells in America and in Europe before you know who they are in Italy. The ice falls, it touches "Grunge" and it doesn't let the melody fade away." Massimo Cotto (Max)
- "Meatsuit convinced me to keep an eye on future releases of the band and it's definitely recommended for every alternative, metal or old school nu-metal lover." Furyrocks (Netherlands)
- "The album offers a lot of fine hooks and varied arrangements for all the rockers out there. The more you listen to 'Meatsuit', the more you like it. And that was a feature of many good albums." Musicheadquarter.de
- "Meatsuit is an incredible album! Close your eyes and listen to it...the vocals of Vice seep into your soul and your body begins to sway....the music creeps into your legs and you just can't help but dance." Deviants Underground Radio, Knoxville (Usa)

== Awards ==
Year	Nominated work	Award	Result	Place
2001	Fallingice "Another Day"	Coop For Music Contest	Won	—
2002	Fallingice "No Meaning"	Coop For Music Contest	Nominated	—
2003	Fallingice "Unclear"	Coop For Music Contest	Nominated	—
"—" denotes a nomination that did not place or places were not relevant in the award.

== Discography ==
=== Albums ===
- Meatsuit – (2010)

=== EPs ===
- Lymph – (2006)

=== Singles ===
2011 – Breathing Machine

Breathing Machine – the name of single released by Fallingice in 2011. For the song was shot music video.

Music video

The first video, shot by Fallingice was for "Breathing Machine". At the beginning it shows a man, who wakes up in his car at the petrol station and sees the stranger in suit who seems to be a medical worker. Then he drives to the night-club and again notices that man sitting on the sofa and later in the toilet. And sometimes appear the group playing in a hospital near X-ray machine. When the scream-party appear the man wakes up tied to the breathing machine and sees the stranger as a doctor with radiograph in his hands.

=== Videography ===
- Breathing Machine (2011)
- Unclear (2013)
- Teenage boy (2013)

== Band members ==
Current members

- Valerio Vizioli (Vice) – Vocals, guitars (1999–present)
- Alessandro Davoli (Bem) – Bass (2007–present)
- Fabrizio Baioni (Fab) – Drums (2007–present)

Former members

- Gabriele Barone – Bass (1999–2006)
- Luca Reale – Drums (1999–2000)
- Lorenzo Ilari – Drums (2001–2004)
- Paolo Calabria – Drums (2004–2007)
