= To Earth with Love =

1999 single by Gay Dad

Single by Gay Dad

from the album Leisure Noise
- B-side: "US Roach"; "51 Pegasus"; "How It Might End"; "Soft Return"
- Released: 18 January 1999
- Length: 5:04
- Label: London
- Songwriters: Nick Crowe; Cliff Jones; Nigel Hoyle; James Risebero
- Producer: Tony Visconti

Gay Dad singles chronology
"To Earth with Love" (1999)	"Joy!" (1999)

"To Earth with Love" is a song English rock band Gay Dad, released on 18 January 1999 as their debut single and lead single from their first album, Leisure Noise. The song peaked at number 10 in the UK Singles Chart and number 35 in New Zealand. A demo version was featured as single of the week in 1998 on the Mark and Lard show.

== Accolades ==
Publication	Country	Accolade	Year	Rank
NME	United Kingdom	'On' Singles of the Year	1999	2
NME	United Kingdom	Best Singles of the Year	1999	26
Melody Maker	United Kingdom	Best Singles of the Year	1999	11

== Track listings ==
UK CD1

1. "To Earth with Love" (edit)
2. "US Roach"
3. "51 Pegasus"

UK CD2

1. "To Earth with Love" (full version)
2. "How It Might End"
3. "Soft Return"

UK 10-inch single

A. "To Earth with Love" (full version)
B. "US Roach"

European CD single

1. "To Earth with Love" (radio edit)
2. "US Roach"

Australian CD single

1. "To Earth with Love" (radio edit)
2. "US Roach"
3. "Soft Return"
4. "51 Pegasus"

== Charts ==
Chart (1999)	Peak position
Europe (Eurochart Hot 100)	40
New Zealand (Recorded Music NZ)	35
Scotland Singles (OCC)	9
UK Singles (OCC)	10
