= Meatsuit =

Studio album by Fallingice
- Released: 16 July 2010
- Recorded: West Link Recordings, Pisa; Red House Recordings, Senigallia
- Genre: Alternative rock, Grunge
- Length: 46:55
- Label: Ukdivision Records/Roadrunner Belgium
- Producer: Alessandro Paolucci and Fallingice

Fallingice chronology
Lymph (2006)	Meatsuit (2010)

Professional ratings
Review scores
Source	Rating
Dan MacIntosh	link
Massimo Cotto (Max)	link
Alex Henderson	link
Nerds Attack	link
Music in Belgium	link

Meatsuit is the debut studio album of Fallingice, released on 16 July 2010 via Ukdivision Records. In November 2010 it was also distributed and promoted in Benelux (Belgium, Netherlands and Luxembourg) by Roadrunner Records Belgium. Some songs were recorded at the beginning of 2000s.

== Track listing ==
1. "Unclear" (4:05)
2. "Another Day" (2:52)
3. "Inner Confusion" (4:00)
4. "Soap Bubble" (4:14)
5. "Breathing Machine" (3:31)
6. "Hands in Chains" (5:15)
7. "Desired" (4:53)
8. "Teenage Boy" (3:27)
9. "Memories" (5:15)
10. "Too Bored To Die" (4:56)
11. "My Cold Heart" (4:22)

== Personnel ==
- Produced by Alessandro Paolucci and Fallingice
- Recorded by Alessandro Sportelli and Alessandro Paolucci at West Link Recordings, Pisa, Italy

Except vocals recorded by David Lenci and Mano Moccia at Red House Recordings, Senigallia, Italy

- Mixed by David Lenci at Red House Recordings, Senigallia.
- Mastered by Tom Baker at Precision Mastering, Hollywood.
- Artwork by Bem Calavera
- Album photography by Leonardo Rinaldesi
- A&R: Carlo Bellotti
