= Clor (album) =

Studio album by Clor
- Released: July 25, 2005
- Recorded: 2005
- Genres: Indie rock, indietronica, synthpop, post-punk revival
- Length: 45:30
- Label: Parlophone

Singles from Clor
- 1. "Love + Pain" Released: April 2005; 2. "Outlines" Released: July 2005; 3. "Good Stuff" Released: October 2005

Professional ratings
Review scores
Source	Rating
AllMusic	4/5 stars
The Guardian	(8/10)
Mojo	(8/10)
NME	(8/10)
Pitchfork Media	(8.2/10)
Uncut	(8/10)

Clor is the self-titled debut and only album from short-lived English post-punk revival group Clor. It was ranked number one in NME magazine's 2010 list "The 100 greatest albums you've never heard". It was released to widespread critical acclaim and reached number 77 on the UK Albums Chart.

== Track listing ==
1. "Good Stuff"
2. "Outlines"
3. "Love + Pain"
4. "Hearts on Fire"
5. "Gifted"
6. "Stuck in a Tight Spot"
7. "Dangerzone"
8. "Magic Touch"
9. "Making You All Mine"
10. "Garden of Love"
11. "Goodbye"
