= Leisure Noise =

Studio album by Gay Dad
- Released: 7 June 1999
- Genre: Post-Britpop, neo-psychedelia, space rock
- Length: 46:50
- Label: London
- Producer: Chris Hughes; Tony Visconti; Mark Frith

Gay Dad chronology
Leisure Noise (1999)	Transmission (2001)

Singles from Leisure Noise
- 1. "To Earth with Love" Released: 18 January 1999; 2. "Joy!" Released: 24 May 1999; 3. "Oh Jim" Released: 2 August 1999

Leisure Noise is the first album by London band Gay Dad, released via London Records and Sire Records on 7 June 1999. The album is a blending of glam rock, neo-psychedelia, krautrock and gospel into indie pop. Lyrically it is often about and constructed of rock history. The track listing was designed to mimic the traditional two-sided vinyl and the album was made available on vinyl.

Chris Hughes produced the album, except for "To Earth with Love", which was produced by Tony Visconti and Mark Frith. Gary Langan handled recording and mixing; Howie Weinberg mastered the album at Masterdisc in New York City.

== Critical response ==
Professional ratings
Review scores
Source	Rating
AllMusic	4/5 stars
Robert Christgau	(dud)
Entertainment Weekly	B+
NME	8/10
Pitchfork	0.9/10
Q	4/5 stars
Rolling Stone	3.5/5 stars
Wall of Sound	85/100

Accolades

Publication	Country	Accolade	Year	Rank
Melody Maker	United Kingdom	Best Albums of the Year	1999	13th
Mojo	United Kingdom	Best Albums of the Year	1999	28th
Select	United Kingdom	Best Albums of the Year	1999	22nd

In 2014, NME included the album in its list of "30 Glorious Britpop Albums That Deserve a Reissue Pronto," saying "A music journalist turned rock star? It’ll never catch on… Hmmm, back in a sec… Anyway, Face scribe Cliff Jones might've cut a faintly ridiculous figure but he had the looks and – in "Joy!" and "To Earth with Love" – songs that could light up any Cool Britannic indie dancefloor. Just imagine those brash cuts freshly remastered."

== Track listing ==
All tracks written by Nicholas Crowe, Cliff Jones, Nigel Hoyle and James Riseboro, except where noted.

1. "Dimstar" – 5:14
2. "Joy!" – 5:00
3. "Oh Jim" – 2:46
4. "My Son Mystic" – 3:25
5. "Black Ghost" (Crowe, Jones, Hoyle, Jim Irvin, Riseboro) – 7:35
6. "To Earth with Love" – 5:04
7. "Dateline" – 4:43
8. "Pathfinder" – 3:56
9. "Different Kind of Blue" (Crowe, Jones, Hoyle, Irvin, Riseboro) – 4:51
10. "Jesus Christ" (Crowe, Jones, Hoyle, Irvin, Riseboro) – 4:16

== Personnel ==
Personnel per booklet.

Gay Dad

- Cliff Jones
- James Riseboro
- Nicholas Crowe
- Nigel Hoyle

Additional musicians

- Carol Kenyon – additional vocals (tracks 2 and 10)
- Guy Barker – horns (track 7)
- Lynton Naiff – horn arrangement (track 7)

Production

- Chris Hughes – producer (all tracks except 6)
- Tony Visconti – producer (track 6)
- Mark Frith – co-producer
- Gary Langan – recording, mixing
- Howie Weinberg – mastering

Design

- Peter Saville – graphic art
- Paul Hetherington – graphic art
- Howard Wakefield – graphic art
- Paul Barnes – logo concept
