= Nightnurse =

English indie rock band

- Origin: London, England
- Years active: 1996–2000
- Label: Better Records
- Past members: Ellyott (אליוט); Charlotte Hatherley; Ben Drakeford; Alex Lutes; Debbie Smith; Charley Stone; Max Platts; Ben Drakeford; Dicki Fliszar

Nightnurse was an English indie rock band from London, England, who had some success in the late 1990s. They released three singles, with their second "Skirt" reaching no.11 in the UK Independent Singles Chart in February 1998. They were the first band to ever release an MP3 single 'IDF/Big Sleep' and were recognised by the Guinness Book of Records for doing so. Their debut album was recorded at Blackwing studios, but never released as the label Better Records folded in 2000.

== History ==
Formed in 1996 by lead singer and previous Pollyanna Frank and Sister George front-woman Ellyott Dragon (born: Sharon Ben-Ezzer), Nightnurse's original line up consisted of Ellyott on guitar and vocals, Charlotte Hatherley on guitar, Ben Drakeford on bass guitar and Alex Lutes on drums. After playing only 6 gigs together the band were signed to ex Creation Records boss Tim Abbott's Better Records label. In 1997 the band's profile was raised considerably after winning the NME 'Best New Band' award having been together for a just few months. They achieved some success with their debut single "Golem" which received a small amount of radio play on BBC Radio 1 and video play on MTV Europe but did not chart. Shortly after the release of this single Charlotte Hatherley left the band to join fellow indie rockers Ash.

The band worked with a number of guitarists as replacement, including Debbie Smith (Curve, Echobelly) and Charley Stone (Gay Dad), who recorded a second single with the band called "Skirt", which charted at No.11 in the UK Independent Singles Chart in 1998. The single was XFM's 'Single of the Week'. The band subsequently toured on the success of the single, this time with new guitarist Matt Platts, supporting other 1990s UK indie bands including Rachel Stamp, Jolt, Snow Patrol, The Monsoon Bassoon, Cay and Seafood.

A follow-up single was double A-side 'IDF/Big Sleep' released on a white label limited edition 7" vinyl through S16 Records. This pressing was deleted on the day of release and the band made history by self-releasing the UK's first ever official MP3 format single, receiving 30,000 downloads from their website in a week.

In late 1997, Nightnurse recorded their debut album at the Blackwing Studios in London. However, after severe financial difficulties, the band's label Better Records fell into liquidation and so the album was never released. A message posted on the band's official Myspace page in 2006 stated that the album was to be re-mastered and released at some time in the future. A date has yet to be announced.

After the release of their third single Nightnurse were signed by Sanctuary Management, and were joined by drummer Dicki Fliszar, who replaced Alex Lutes. They went on to record 4 new demo tracks at Trident studios in South London. They toured extensively, but finally parted ways in 2000.

== Members ==
1996

- Ellyott- lead vocals / guitar
- Charlotte Hatherley- guitar
- Ben Drakeford - bass guitar
- Alex Lutes - drums

1997

- Ellyott - lead vocals / guitar
- Debbie Smith - guitar
- Charley Stone - guitar
- Matt Platts - guitar
- Alex Lutes - drums

later

- Ellyott - lead vocals / guitar
- Matt Platts - guitar / backing vocals
- Ben Drakeford - bass guitar
- Dicki Fliszar - drums

== Singles ==
- "Golem" (1 April 1997) CD single / 7" vinyl - Better Records
- "Skirt" (12 January 1998) CD single / 7" vinyl - Better Records
- "IDF" (26 October 1998) ltd 7" vinyl / MP3 - S16 Records / Nightnurse
