= Charley Stone =

English multi-instrumentalist musician

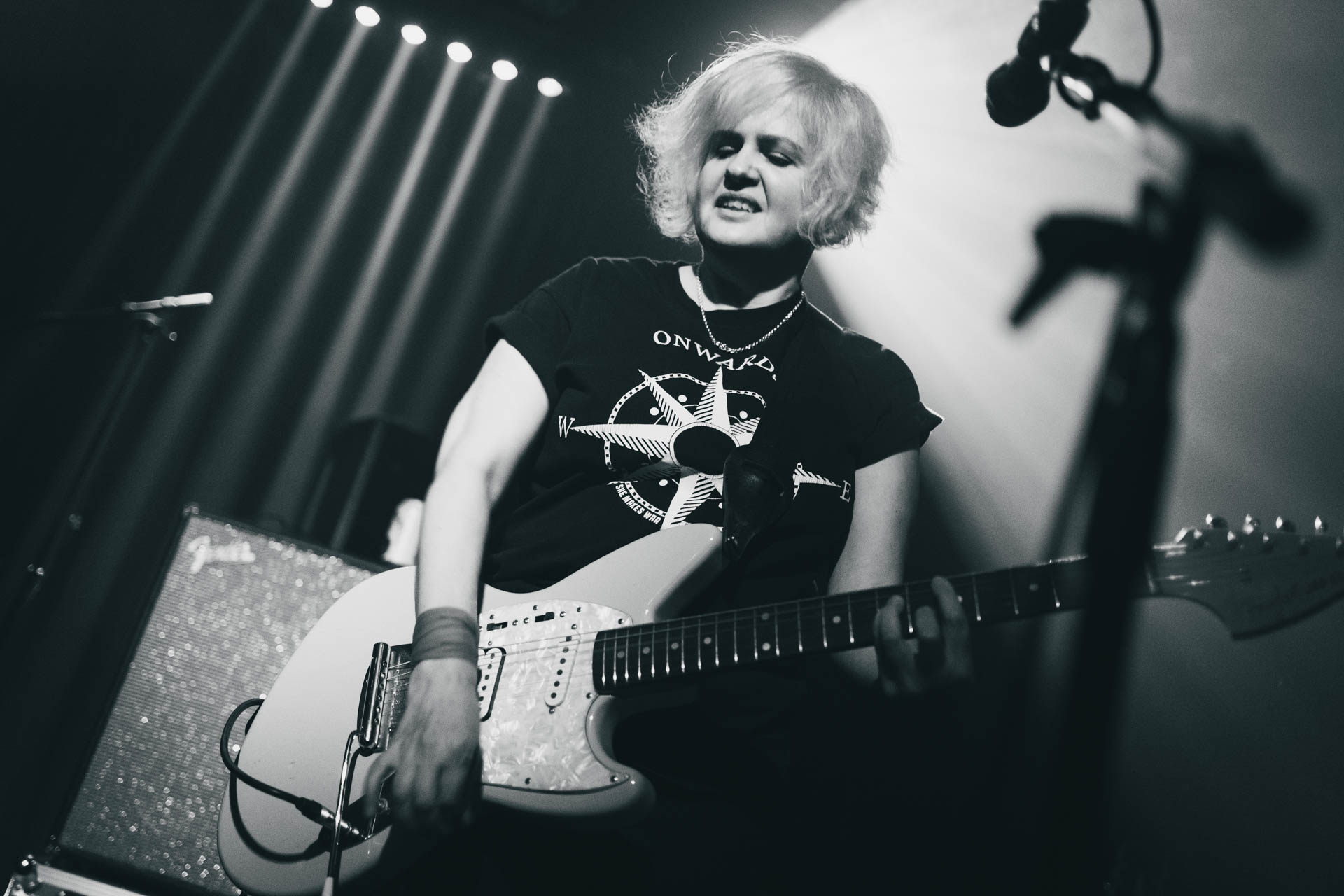

Background information
- Origin: United Kingdom
- Genres: Indie rock, Britpop, riot grrrl, garage rock, post-punk
- Occupations: Musician, producer
- Instruments: Guitar, bass guitar, vocals
- Years active: 1993 – present
- Member of: Charley Stone & the Actual Band, Desperate Journalist, Sleeper, Joanne Joanne, Keith Top of the Pops and His Minor UK Indie Celebrity All-Star Backing Band, the Fallen Women, Ye Nuns, the Abba Stripes, the Dumb Blondes, the Hive Fives
- Formerly of: Nightnurse, Salad, Gay Dad, Fosca, Charlotte Hatherley, Linus, the Priscillas, Spy '51, Deptford Beach Babes, the New Royal Family, the Famous Cocks, MX Tyrants, the Misters of Circe, W*llstonekraft
- Website: charleystone.bandcamp.com

Charley Stone is an English multi-instrumentalist musician based in London, UK. Active in the indie scene since the early 1990s, in 2024 Stone released her debut solo album, "Here Comes The Actual Band", to positive reviews from Louder Than War, Loud Women, The Idler, and others.

== History ==
Charley Stone first came to notice in short-lived riot grrrl band Frantic Spiders, from Exeter, who released EP You're Dead in 1993; she also played in Toxic Shock Syndrome. Stone then joined Britpop band Salad in 1996. In 1997 she replaced Charlotte Hatherley on guitar in the band Nightnurse after Hatherley left to join Ash.

In 1998 Stone joined Gay Dad as guitarist and also first played live with Fosca, as she would continue to do over the next decade. Stone also joined Linus as bass player. By 2003 Stone was playing in Spy '51, who although active since the 1990s released their debut album in 2006.

Since the 2000s Stone has both performed solo and played with a number of artists including the Priscillas, the New Royal Family/the Famous Cocks, Deptford Beach Babes, Charlotte Hatherley, W*llstonekraft, MX Tyrants, Misters of Circe, and Salad. She has also worked as a producer for new bands, such as the Wimmins' Institute.

In addition, Stone currently plays in the Fallen Women, Desperate Journalist, Sleeper, Keith Top of the Pops and His Minor UK Indie Celebrity All-Star Backing Band, Ye Nuns, Joanne Joanne, the Abba Stripes, the Dumb Blondes, the Hive Fives, and Charley Stone & the Actual Band.

== Selected discography ==
- 1993 Frantic Spiders - You're Dead (EP)
- 1996 Nightnurse - "Skirt" (single)
- 2003 Spy 51 - We Jet Hem (mini album)
- 2003 Spy 51 - "Sheila's Sister" (single)
- 2006 Spy 51 - Play For Your Life (album)
- 2007 The New Royal Family/Keith TOTP - EP
- 2009 Deptford Beach Babes - Sunbathing On A Vinyl Floor (album)
- 2011 Keith TOTP et al - Fuck You I'm Keith TOTP (album)
- 2013 Keith TOTP et al - TOTP2 (album)
- 2014 Ye Nuns - Nun More Black (album)
- 2016 MX Tyrants - Masters (EP)
- 2017 Salad - The Lost Album Vol. 1 (album)
- 2018 Keith TOTP et al - Livin' The Dream (album)
- 2019 Salad - The Salad Way (album)
- 2020 MX Tyrants - Many (EP)
- 2022 Desperate Journalist - Live at JT Soar (album)
- 2024 Charley Stone - Here Comes The Actual Band (album)
