= Mouthfull =

- Origin: London, United Kingdom
- Genres: Queercore, grunge, punk, pop
- Years active: 1994-2000
- Label: Better Records
- Past members: Andy McHaffie; Mike Wyeld; Yasmin Sairally; Lea Andrews; Monsoon; Ruth Crumey
- Website: www.last.fm/music/Mouthfull

Mouthfull was a pioneering queercore band based in London, England from 1994 to 2000. Influenced by the San Francisco and Toronto Queercore scenes, the band set up queercore nightclub Up To The Elbow in Camden, London. Core members were guitarist / vocalist Andy McHaffie and bass player Mike Wyeld, although Mike contributed vocals to two songs. The band regularly played with other bands on the scene, and even promoted other bands gigs. The band released a single early on in the US, called 16, a song fighting the then ongoing age of consent debate for gay men in the UK. On the back of that, a new line up without original members Lea and Yaz, but with new 17-year-old drummer Monsoon had a record deal with a small London label.

Mouthfull recorded one album with that label, but the deal subsequently ended acrimoniously. The band then found another record label to release the album, but that label met its demise shortly after. The album went unmastered for years, until one of the members found the tapes. Digitally remastered, the album, Mouthfull by Mouthfull (alternate title Bring Balloons), was freed for distribution by the Musicians Union and is now available for free download from various sources.

Over the years, the band played with dozens of their heroes, from Tom Robinson ("Glad to Be Gay") to Sister George and Pansy Division. They are considered one of the first UK homocore bands alongside Sister George, Children's Hour, and others. Lea Andrews went on to form Spy 51, and later performed with the band Spinster, and as a solo artist.
