= Grey Will Fade =

Studio album by Charlotte Hatherley
- Released: 16 August 2004
- Studio: Wild Hamster, Los Angeles
- Genre: Pop punk, power pop
- Length: 41:33
- Label: Double Dragon
- Producer: Eric Drew Feldman

Charlotte Hatherley chronology
Grey Will Fade (2004)	The Deep Blue (2007)

Singles from Grey Will Fade
- 1. "Kim Wilde" Released: 7 June 2004; 2. "Summer" Released: 9 August 2004; 3. "Bastardo" Released: 21 February 2005

Grey Will Fade is the debut studio album by English musician Charlotte Hatherley, the guitarist for Ash, released by Double Dragon Music on 16 August 2004. Spurred on by the positive response to "Grey Will Fade", which appeared as a B-side to Ash's single "There's a Star" (2001), Hatherley set about recording her solo album. Enlisting the help of Eric Drew Feldman, the sessions for the album were happening concurrently in Los Angeles, California, at Wild Hamster, while Ash was recording their album Meltdown (2004). Described as a pop punk and power pop record, Hatherley's vocals on Grey Will Fade earned her comparisons to Björk, Tanya Donelly, and PJ Harvey.

Grey Will Fade received generally favourable reviews from critics, some of whom commented positively on the songwriting. The album charted at number 48 in Scotland and number 51 in the UK. "Summer" and "Bastardo" both reached a peak of number 31 on the UK Singles Chart. Despite Grey Will Fade being announced in early 2004, Hatherley was occupied touring with Ash to support Meltdown. The digital-only lead single, "Kim Wilde", was released on 7 June 2004, followed by the second single, "Summer", on 9 August 2004. While Ash took a break from touring, Hatherley went on her first solo tour in September 2004. "Bastardo" was released as the third single on 21 February 2005; Edgar White directed the video for this and "Summer".

== Background and production ==
At age 15, Charlotte Hatherley became the guitarist of Nightnurse. Over the course of the next two years, she grew as a musician while performing on the club circuit. Around this time, Ash frontman Tim Wheeler was interested in bringing in another guitarist after witnessing the interplay between Weezer members Rivers Cuomo and Brian Bell. After learning of this through mutual friends, Hatherley joined Ash at first temporarily. She performed on the band's non-album single "A Life Less Ordinary", released in October 1997. Hatherley's contributions impressed the band who made her an official member. Over the course of the next four years, Hatherley appeared on the band's second and third studio albums, Nu-Clear Sounds (1998) and Free All Angels (2001). She co-wrote three songs on the two albums and had sole writing credit for the B-sides "Taken Out" and "Gonna Do It Soon".

"There's a Star", the fifth single from Free All Angels, featured Hatherley's "Grey Will Fade" as a B-side, which received a positive reaction from their fanbase. Spurred on by this response, Hatherley set about making a solo album; she wanted to create "XTC-style music with B-52's vocals". In between breaks from Ash, she would demo material in London, and eventually find herself waiting for the right moment to record it all. She sent some demos to Corinne Feldman, a friend of hers from the Nightnurse period, who was living in San Francisco, California. Hatherley received an email from Corinne's husband and musician Eric Drew Feldman, who enjoyed what he heard. Feldman had attached his CV, which listed previous artists he worked with, such as Captain Beefheart, Frank Black and PJ Harvey. Hatherley was then enthusiastic about the possibility of working with Feldman.

Ash then embarked on an extensive tour of the United States, which resulted in them deciding to take a two-month break. Hatherley decided to travel to Los Angeles, California, where she recorded at Wild Hamster in Los Angeles, with Feldman as producer, while Rob Laufer handled recording. Feldman enlisted Rob Ellis, who drummed for Harvey, to play on the songs. She re-made "Grey Will Fade" during this process she thought the original was "all a bit rushed", finishing the re-make in a two-hour session. Between October 2003 and January 2004, Ash were recording Meltdown (2004), also in Los Angeles. There were a few instances where Hatherley recorded with the band during the mornings, only to spend the afternoons on the other side of Los Angeles recording her album. Laufer, Feldman, and Hatherley mixed the recordings before Mark Chalecki mastered the tracks at Capitol Mastering in Hollywood, California.

== Composition ==
Musically, the sound of Grey Will Fade has been described as pop punk and power pop, with Hatherley's vocals recalling elements of Tanya Donelly, PJ Harvey and Björk. Hatherley noted a contrast in its indie-based sound to her bandmates' heavy metal roots. She added that as Meltdown was "definitely more heavy metal", she made "something which was more the kind of music I love," citing David Bowie, Kate Bush, and XTC. Grey Will Fade has sparse song arrangements, led predominantly by Hatherley's guitarwork. For the most part, Hatherley handles vocals, guitars, and bass, while Ellis played drums and Feldman the keyboards. Feldman played bass on "Down" and "Grey Will Fade"; Nick Vincent played drums on "Kim Wils" and "Bastardo"; Laufer and Hatherley added keyboards to "Where I'm Calling From"; Moris Tepper provided guitar for "Stop"; and Laufer sang backing vocals on "Why You Wanna?". Some of the tracks dated to five-to-six years prior, while "Kim Wilde" and "Summer", the most recent two, were both written two years earlier.

The opening track, "Kim Wilde", name checks "Kids in America" (1981) and "Chequered Love" (1981) by Kim Wilde. The song incorporates guitars in the vein of Blondie, Fleetwood Mac-esque vocal harmonies, and varying tempo changes. Hatherley said the song was not about Wilde, as the name was a working title since it initially existed as an instrumental track. "Paragon" is reminiscent of Ash's earlier material; "Summer", which features handclaps and Jools Holland-esque piano work, sees the narrator wishing for their situation to improve. Hatherley referred to the latter as a "fairly obvious summer time song". The Pixies-lite "Stop" uses metallic krautrock guitar parts. The acoustic and electronica track "Where I'm Calling From" shares a similar structure to "Space Oddity" (1969) by Bowie. "Bastardo" is the story of a Spanish man who steals a guitar, and was compared to the works of Kirsty MacColl. The closing track "Grey Will Fade" is an optimistic message to a friend who was struggling in school.

== Release ==
In March 2004, NME reported that Hatherley's debut was scheduled for release later in the year. On 22 May 2004, Grey Will Fade was formally announced for release in three months' time. Between May and August 2004, Hatherley was occupied touring with Ash to support Meltdown. "Kim Wilde" was released as a digital-only single on 7 June 2004. Hatherley explained she did not expect people to buy it physically, and to her surprise, the track had 8,000 downloads in its first week of release. "Summer" was released as a single on 9 August 2004; the CD version featured "Commodore" and "S.M.U.T" as extra tracks. The music video for "Summer" premiered on NME's website on 14 July 2004. Double Dragon Music released Grey Will Fade on 16 August 2004; Hatherley said upon finishing the album, she knew that she wished for the album to come out on an independent label instead of Infectious Records, which Ash was signed to. Double Dragon Music was owned by Ash's manager, which Hatherley thought would be a good option.

As Ash were taking a break from touring in September 2004, Hatherley embarked on her debut solo tour, playing a handful of UK shows. "Bastardo" was released as a single on 21 February 2005; the CD version featured "3 Minutes" and "I Am a Kamera" as extra tracks, while the DVD version included audio versions of "Bastardo" and an acoustic version of "Kim Wilde", and videos for "Bastardo", and a making-of feature. Grey Will Fade was released in the US on 4 April 2005. It was released in Japan in May 2005 in two editions: a CD with "3 Minutes" and "I Am a Kamera" as extra tracks, the other adding a bonus DVD with the music videos for "Summer" and "Bastardo". Edgar Wright directed both videos; "Summer"'s incorporated animation, while "Bastardo"'s featured appearances from Simon Pegg, Lucy Davis, and David Walliams.

== Reception ==
Professional ratings
Review scores
Source	Rating
AllMusic	3.5/5 stars
Drowned in Sound	6/10
The Guardian	3/5 stars
The Irish Times	4/5 stars
Kerrang!	3/5 stars
Metal Hammer	7/10
NME	7/10
Rock Hard	8/10
RTÉ	4/5 stars

Grey Will Fade was met with generally favourable reviews from critics. Rock Hard writer Michael Rensen said Hatherley offered "creamy, surprisingly multi-layered songwriting that goes well beyond the catchy tune" of Ash. Séamus Leonard of RTÉ wrote Hatherley had done "a fine job" with the album, finding "Stop" to be the only misstep. The Irish Times' Anna Carey wrote the majority of the album "doesn't quite live up" to "Kim Wilde", however, "it's still an excellent collection of choppy, poppy songs," full of "honey-sweet harmonies and buzzy guitars". The Independent music critic Andy Gill called it a "confident and engaging solo debut". The staff at the Manchester Evening News saw the album as "[g]reat summer guitar pop with enthisastic [sic], infectious lyrics and a charming, cheeky approach that suggests Hatherley can add yet another string to her ever-growing bow".

AllMusic reviewer Alan Severa wrote that the record "sometimes trips up through a kind of over-enthusiasm, this album is indeed the debut of a rather maverick talent". Barry Nicolson of NME wrote the album was "hardly a radical departure," with Hatherley's vocals becoming "a little too bland and weedy". He added, it was a "minor triumph, then, and if it doesn't repeat the chart-straddling success of the day job, put it down to lack of practice". Drowned in Sound's Tom Edwards said Hatherley "does manage to impress in the tunes department". The Guardian music correspondent Caroline Sullivan wrote that the album "delves further into fluttery pop than the power-rocking Ash would deem acceptable". BBC Music writer Jack Smith said that the album was "firmly traditional and far from groundbreaking ... nothing here has the punch and sheer momentum of Ash's 'Burn Baby Burn'".

Grey Will Fade reached number 48 in Scotland, and number 51 in the UK. "Summer" and "Bastardo" both reached number 31 on the UK Singles Chart. Playlouder ranked Grey Will Fade at number nine on their list of the top 50 albums of 2004. "Kim Wilde" topped Playlouder's list of the top 50 singles of 2004, while "Bastardo" ranked at number 37 for the 2005 list. In a 2022 interview, Hatherley said the album was a "great experience because there were songs I’d written that were never going to be on an Ash record". She added that while Wheeler encouraged her writing, she felt "too awkward about it to say 'I've written these songs, do you think they could be on the [next Ash] album?'"

== Track listing ==
All songs written by Charlotte Hatherley.

1. "Kim Wilde" – 4:20
2. "Rescue Plan" – 2:55
3. "Paragon" – 4:13
4. "Summer" – 4:50
5. "Down" – 4:35
6. "Stop" – 3:46
7. "Where I'm Calling From" – 3:56
8. "Why You Wanna?" – 4:16
9. "Bastardo" – 3:56
10. "Grey Will Fade" – 4:46

== Personnel ==
Personnel per booklet.

Musicians

- Charlotte Hatherley – vocals, guitar, bass, keyboards (track 7)
- Rob Ellis – drums
- Eric Drew Feldman – keyboards, bass (tracks 5 and 10)
- Nick Vincent – drums (tracks 1 and 9)
- Rob Laufer – keyboards (track 7), backing vocals (track 8)
- Moris Tepper – guitar (track 6)

Production and design

- Rob Laufer – recording, mixing
- Eric Drew Feldman – producer, mixing
- Charlotte Hatherley – mixing
- Mark Chalecki – mastering
- Oscar Wright – artwork
- ilovedust – artwork
- Emma Summerton – photography

== Charts ==
Chart performance for Grey Will Fade
Chart (2004)	Peak position
Scottish Albums (Official Charts)	48
UK Albums (Official Charts)	51
