= Transmission (Gay Dad album) =

Studio album by Gay Dad
- Released: 24 September 2001
- Recorded: 2000–2001
- Genre: Glam rock, electronica
- Length: 53:07
- Label: B-Unique
- Producer: Ben Chapman, Gay Dad

Gay Dad chronology
Leisure Noise (1999)	Transmission (2001)

Singles from Transmission
- 1. "Now Always and Forever" Released: 19 March 2001; 2. "Harder Faster" Released: 2001; 3. "Transmission" Released: 2001

Transmission is the second and final studio album by London band Gay Dad, released via B-Unique on 24 September 2001. The music is drastically changed from the glam rock, neo-psychedelia, krautrock, gospel and indie pop styles of their previous album, into a more electronic style. The album itself was met with mixed reviews, and was not a commercial success.

== Background and production ==
Gay Dad released their debut studio album Leisure Noise in June 1999. In spite of its mixed reception, it peaked at number 14 in the UK. Two of its three singles – "To Earth with Love" and "Joy!" – reached the top 40 in the UK Singles Chart, with the former peaking at number ten. It was promoted with an appearance at the CMJ Music Marathon, marking the band's debut in the United States. In November 1999, guitarist Charley Stone left the band, and was temporarily replaced by Andy Bell of Hurricane No. 1, and then by Stewart Forrester. By this point, the band were in the process of writing material for their next album. They had started recorded in London in early 2000; by August of that year, Cliff Jones revealed that the band had felt fatigued from their recent touring that the recording proved unfruitful.

Transmission was recorded in late 2000 and early 2001, produced by Ben Chapman and the band. The recording process was handled for the most part by Roger Tebutt, who also did additional recording for "Plane Going Down", "Dinosaur", and "Everything Changes". Fulton Dingley recorded "Nightclub" and "Dinosaur", and did additional recording for "Transmission". Mark Firth and Tom Elmhurst recorded "Plane Going Down"; Danton Supple recorded "Everything Changes". Stephen Harris mixed the recordings, before the album was mastered by Geoff Pesche at The Townhouse Studios.

== Composition and lyrics ==
Musically, the sound of Transmission has been described as glam rock, and electronica. Jones, Nicholas Crowe, and Nigel Hoyle wrote "Transmission", "Now Always and Forever", "Nightclub", "Harder Faster", "All My Life", "Dinosaur", and "Promise of a Miracle", while "Plane Going Down", "Breathe", "Shoot Freak", "Keep It Heavy", and "Everything Changes" were credited to Jones, James Riseboro, Crowe, and Hoyle. The album's opening song "Transmission" was reminiscent of the Manic Street Preachers' early glam pop work. "Now Always and Forever" is representative of the remainder of the album, with its loop-based structure, accompanied by other effects, such as the sound of wind and echo. "Harder Faster" comes across as a version of Super Furry Animals fronted by Axl Rose. The pop rock song "Plane Going Down" is preceded by the ballad "All My Life". "Dinosaur" is a pop-metal track that is followed by the T. Rex-esque "Shoot Freak". "Keep It Heavy" apes the sound of the Smashing Pumpkins, specifically their album Gish (1991), and Marion.

== Release ==
Gay Dad played their first show as a trio in November 2000, following the departure of Risebero. At this time, their upcoming album was scheduled for release in mid 2001. "Now Always and Forever" was released as a single on 19 March 2001. Two versions were released on CD: the first with "Estigon" and "God Has Moved On", while the second included "Surprise Party" and "Captains of Industry". In March and April 2001, the band went on a tour of the UK. "Harder Faster" was released as a single. The CD version featured "Without Sound", while the 7" vinyl version included a demo of "Nightclub".

"Transmission" was released as a single; the 7" vinyl version included "Sailing By". Two versions were released on CD: the first with "Art Since 1978" and "Dead Man", while the second featured "The Aim of the Game" and "Young Heart Attack". Transmission was released in Japan, with the bonus track "Someone Like You", on 14 November 2001, through Cutting Edge. Transmission was released in the United States on 23 April 2002, through Thirsty Ear Recordings. Shortly afterwards, Gay Dad disbanded.

== Reception ==
Professional ratings
Aggregate scores
Source	Rating
Metacritic	52/100
Review scores
Source	Rating
AllMusic	2/5 stars
Alternative Press	3/5 stars
Blender	1/5 stars
The Boston Phoenix	2/5 stars
Entertainment Weekly	B
NME	6/10

Transmission was met with mixed reviews from music critics. At Metacritic, which assigns a normalized rating out of 100 to reviews from mainstream publications, the album received an average score of 52, based on five reviews.

Exclaim!'s Rob Bolton considered Transmission "a much better rock record" than their debut release, full of "louder guitars and more hooks to please fans of the scene". Randy Harward of CMJ New Music Report noted that the album was a "12-pack of the same spacy-snotty-slick glam rock poured" onto the band's debut. He added that if the band's American label "works the hell out of this, it just might be a do-over for Gay Dad". Billboard contributor Bradley Bambarger said that after the opening song, "it's mostly downhill", akin to their "intermittently diverting but ultimately superior" debut. In a review for NME, Mark Beaumont wrote that Jones' "birth could probably have been accused of style over content but it’s on ‘Transmission’ that his shallowness really shines". He added that the "ideology, big shiny guitars and o’er-vaulting ambition to be the Last Great Pop Stars are all proudly in yer face but the tunes – how can we put this? – verge too often on the bollocks."

The Boston Phoenix writer Mark Woodlief said it had "big, boisterous production values" compared to its predecessor, though "what this beautifully if somewhat excessively crafted album sounds like is various parts of [...] Jones’s record collection". Ty Burr of Entertainment Weekly reviewed Transmission with two others albums; he simply commented that the band's "glam-Bowie reinventions, culminat[e] midway in the pop-rock nuggetry of 'Plane Going Down' before crashing to earth". AllMusic reviewer Dean Carlson wrote that while it was "marginally stronger" than their debut album, it "forgets to bring along the same natural pop drive and offers more of the same well-honed faux iconic babble". Blender's John Perry described the album as being "more Bon Jovi than Blur, bloated with stadium-friendly power ballads". Eric J. Iannelli for Ink 19 said album "suffer from frivolous overproduction, in both musical and lyrical terms it is tediously bland". He added that "[w]hatever Gay Dad was aiming for, Transmission falls despairingly shy of the mark".

"Now Always and Forever" reached number 41 in the UK, while "Transmission" peaked at number 58.

== Track listing ==
All tracks written by Cliff Jones, Nicholas Crowe and Nigel Hoyle.

1. "Transmission" – 4:18
2. "Now Always and Forever" – 4:17
3. "Nightclub" – 3:12
4. "Harder Faster" – 5:04
5. "Plane Going Down" (Jones, James Riseboro, Crowe, Hoyle) – 5:42
6. "All My Life" – 4:20
7. "Breathe" (Jones, Riseboro, Crowe, Hoyle) – 5:40
8. "Dinosaur" – 5:27
9. "Shoot Freak" (Jones, Riseboro, Crowe, Hoyle) – 4:13
10. "Keep It Heavy" (Jones, Riseboro, Crowe, Hoyle) – 3:51
11. "Everything Changes" (Jones, Riseboro, Crowe, Hoyle) – 4:47
12. "Promise of a Miracle" – 2:16

== Personnel ==
Personnel per booklet.

Gay Dad

- Cliff Jones
- Nicholas Crowe
- Nigel Hoyle

Additional musicians

- Denise Johnson – vocals (track 2)
- James Riseboro – keyboards (tracks 5 and 11)
- Brian Wright – cello (track 7)
- The Ragged School – vocals (track 3)

Production and design

- Ben Chapman – producer
- Gay Dad – producer
- Roger Tebutt – recording (tracks 1, 2, 4, 6, 7, 9, 10 and 11), additional recording (tracks 5, 8 and 11)
- Fulton Dingley – additional recording (tracks 1), recording (tracks 3 and 8)
- Mark Firth – recording (track 5)
- Tom Elmhurst – recording (track 5)
- Danton Supple – recording (track 11)
- Stephen Harris – mixing
- Geoff Pesche – mastering
