= The Priscillas =

British power-pop/glam/garage punk band

- Origin: London, England
- Genres: Glam punk, garage punk, power pop
- Years active: 2003–present
- Labels: Damaged Goods, Dirty Water Records, Nag's Head Records
- Members: Jenny Drag; Valkyrie; Taylor; Jola
- Website: http://www.thepriscillas.co.uk/

The Priscillas are a British all female power-pop punk/glam/garage punk band from Holloway, north London.

== History ==
The Priscillas formed in November 2003 with Jenny Drag (vocals), Guri Go-Go (guitar), Kate Kannibal (bass) and Mavis Minx (drums).

The band released two singles on Damaged Goods, "Gonna Rip Up Your Photograph", and "All My Friends Are Zombies" (UK Indie #50), along with an EP "Aloha From Holloway" in 2004. They released the single "Superhero" on Dirty Water Records in August 2007, and an album 10,000 Volts on their own label Nag's Head Records in February 2009.

Their singles have had radio play on Radio 1, BBC 6Music, Xfm, and WFMU; the band has also played in session for Marc Riley on BBC 6Music, have been interviewed on Phill Jupitus's 6Music's breakfast show twice, and played sessions for Resonance FM, as well as WFMU in New York. The band's videos have been playlisted at Topshop branches across Europe, and "Gonna Rip Up Your Photograph" was voted in the shop's top 40 videos of the year.

The band has toured extensively across the UK, in the US, Spain, France, Holland, Belgium, Norway, Ireland, and Switzerland. They have played at festivals from Benidorm's Wild Weekend to the Glastonbury Festival, Leeds Carling Weekend, Bestival, The Big Chill, Lost Vagueness, Litfest, Italy's Festival Beat 15 and Ireland's Electric Picnic. They have played with bands including The Cramps, The Damned and The 5.6.7.8's as well as Electric Eel Shock, Art Brut, The Subways, The Rezillos, The Monks; they were once supported by James Blunt. The band continues to play across the UK and Europe.

The Priscillas wrote the theme song, "Searching For Simon", for the sci-fi comedy feature film, The Search For Simon, by Martin Gooch, which has been screened at festivals worldwide. Jenny Drag aka Jen Brown has a cameo role in the film. The song was released as a single in 2014.

== Members ==
Current

- Jenny Drag – vocals (2003–present)
- Valkyrie – guitar, backing vocals (2014–present)
- Taylor – bass, backing vocals (2018–present)
- Jola - drums (2019-present)

Former

- Guri Go-Go – guitar, vocals (2003–2013)^{[1]}
- Kate Kannibal – bass, vocals (2003–?)
- Mavis Minx – drums (2003–?)
- Heidi Heelz – bass, backing vocals (2013–2018)
- Vera Wild – bass, vocals (2018)
- Phil Martini — drums (c. 2008-2009)
- Charley Stone — guitar (2013)
- Suza Sputnik – bass (c. 2012)
- Stuart Starling – drums (c. 2012)
- Hedge Hotpants – drums
- She Rocola – bass
- Lydia Lollipop – bass
- Lisa Lux - drums, backing vocals (2012-2023)

== Discography ==
=== EPs/Singles ===
- "Gonna Rip Up Your Photograph"/"Brain Surgeon" 7", 2004
- "All My Friends Are Zombies"/"Should Be Me" 7", 2004 - UK Indie Singles #50
- "Aloha From Holloway" CD EP, 2004 (First two singles, extra track and videos)
- "Superhero"/"Y.O.Y." (Dirty Water Records) 7", 2007
- "One Christmas Wish" (Beehive Records) December 2007 (download)
- "Searching For Simon"/"Where's Lydia?" (Headcheck Records) 2014 (download)
- "Angela" CD single and official video, 14 July 2023 - Self-released
- "The Dream" CD and official video 12 April 2024 (Priscillas Pirate Radio)

=== Albums ===
- 10,000 Volts (2009) (Nag's Head Records)
