= Clor =

English band

- Origin: Brixton, England
- Genres: Post-punk revival, indietronica, synthpop, indie rock
- Years active: 2003–2006
- Label: Parlophone
- Past members: Barry Dobbin (vocals, guitar); Luke Smith (guitar and backing vocals); Max Taylor (bass); Bob Earland (keyboards); Harry Bennet (drums, vocals)

Clor was a short-lived five-piece band from Brixton, England, formed by Barry Dobbin and Luke Smith in 2003 and which signed to the Parlophone record label after only six gigs. The band released a self-titled first album, in 2005 to critical acclaim. The album was selected by NME journalist Krissi Murison for the list of "The 100 Greatest Albums You've Never Heard" published by the NME in 2010.

== History ==
The genesis of Clor was a Soho club night entitled Bad Bunny, run by Dobbin and Smith, who wanted to incorporate their own music into their DJ sets. They began recording in Smith's apartment and soon invited associates from the club night into their fold, expanding to a five-piece. Dobbin came upon the name Clor as it "...sounded raw, primitive, and futuristic at the same time". The demo Welcome Music Lovers was recorded in 2004, initially with the idea of being sent out to other clubs to book shows. However, word of mouth saw the offer of a record deal with label Parlophone after just six gigs. The Welcome Music Lovers EP saw release later in 2004, with singles Love + Pain and Outlines preceding debut album Clor in 2005. In May 2006, the band announced that it had split. Their manager stated that the future paths of Dobbin and Smith were unclear, though would likely involve musical pursuits. Smith has since produced Shitdisco's album, Kingdom of Fear (released April 2007), Foals album Total Life Forever (released May 2010), as well as both albums by singer-songwriter Fryars. Dobbin went on to form and front a new band called Barringtone.

== Discography ==
=== Albums ===
- Clor – July 2005 (UK No. 77)

=== EPs ===
- Welcome Music Lovers – July 2004

=== Singles ===
- "Love + Pain" – April 2005 (UK No. 48)
- "Outlines" – July 2005 (UK No. 43)
- "Good Stuff" – October 2005 (UK No. 50)
