= Joy! =

Single by Gay Dad

from the album Leisure Noise
- B-side: "Desire": "Twelve"; "Sly"; "Electrogeist"
- Released: 24 May 1999
- Genre: Britpop
- Length: 5:00
- Label: London-Sire Records
- Songwriters: Jones, Hoyle, Crowe, Risebero
- Producer: Chris Hughes

Gay Dad singles chronology
"To Earth with Love" (1999)	"Joy!" (1999)	"Oh Jim" (1999)

"Joy!" is a song by the English rock band Gay Dad from their first album, Leisure Noise, released as a single on 24 May 1999. It was featured in FIFA 2000 and in 2002 on a Mitsubishi television commercial. Additional vocals on the track are by Carol Kenyon.

== A-Side ==
While most Gay Dad tracks were a collaborative effort, "Joy!" originates from a recording created by Cliff Jones ten years earlier as a student at Durham University. The finished track combines Krautrock metronomic beats, a fluid bass line and scruffy guitar riffs with a plethora of synth effects ultimately ending with a gospel recital of the lyric "Goodbye my darling I'm ready to die". In a Sound on Sound interview, lead singer Cliff Jones described the song as sounding "like a record that was made 10 minutes in the future".

== Track listing ==
CD1

1. "Joy!" (single edit) - 3:40
2. "Sly" - 4:56
3. "Desire" - 5:43

CD2

1. "Joy!" (album version) - 5:00
2. "Electrogeist" - 5:39
3. "Twelve" - 4:14

10" Vinyl

1. "Joy!" (album version) - 5:00
2. "Desire" - 5:43

Cassette

1. "Joy!" (single edit) - 3:40
2. "Electrogeist" - 5:39
3. "Sly" - 4:56

== Charts ==
Chart (1999)	Peak position
UK Singles Chart	22
