= Luke Smith (music producer) =

English musician (born 1978)

Luke Smith (born 4 May 1978) is an English record producer, mixing engineer, musician and songwriter. He was the co-founder, songwriter, guitarist and vocalist of the band Clor. His production and writing credits include Foals, Depeche Mode, Everything Everything, Palace, Anna of The North, Keaton Henson, Charlie Cunningham, Crystal Fighters, Slow Club, Fryars and Petite Noir. He has worked on such popular and critically acclaimed albums as Total Life Forever and Sounds of the Universe.

== Career ==
=== Clor ===
From 2003 to 2005, Smith founded with Barry Dobbin and provided lead guitars and vocals for the band Clor. He co-wrote and produced their eponymous sole album which was released in 2005 to critical acclaim. In May 2006, Smith and his co-founder announced Clor had split up. Later, in 2010, their album was voted number 1 topping NME's “100 greatest albums you've never heard".

=== Production and writing ===
In 2007 to present, Smith has produced a number of critically acclaimed releases. Of his work, Smith's most noted is his production of the seminal second album Total Life Forever by Foals in Gothenburg in 2010 and programming of the twelfth studio album Sounds of the Universe by Depeche Mode in 2009.

He has writing credits on a number of these recordings; he co-wrote The King of Anxiety, the debut EP by Petite Noir, from which the song "Chess" has 4.5 million streams.

His recordings have been released on labels Mute, Parlophone, Domino, Pias, Moshi Moshi, Kitsune, Transgressive, Geffen.

Production and Writing
Artist	Product	Release details
Shitdisco	"Kingdom of Fear"	2007, Fierce Panda
Fryars	"The Ides" EP	2007
Depeche Mode	"Sounds of the Universe"	2009, Mute Records
Everything Everything	"Photoshop Handsome" single	2009, Polydor
Charlotte Hatherley	"New Worlds"	2009, Fullfill
Foals	"Total Life Forever"	2010, Warner
Slow Club	"Paradise"	2011, Moshi Moshi
Crystal Fighters	"Champion Sound" single	2011, Zirkulo
Eugene McGuinness	"The Invitation to the Voyage”	2012, Domino
Is Tropical	"I’m Leaving"	2013, Kitsuné
Theme Park	"Theme Park"	2013, Transgressive
Fryars	"Power”	2014, Fiction Records
Petite Noir	"King of Anxiety" EP	2014, Domino
Crystal Fighters	"Everything is in my Family"	2016, PIAS
Part Company	"Seasons"	2017, Labelgum
Anna of the North	"Lovers"	2017, PIAS
Yasmine Hadman	"Al Jamilat	2017, Crammed Discs
Noémie Wolfs	"Hunt You"	2016, Universal Music Belgium
Highs	"Dazzle Camouflage"	2017, Indicia
Bazart	"2"	2018, PIAS
Life	"A Picture of Good Health"	2019, Afghan Moon
Chartreuse	"Even Free Money Doesn't Get Me Out of Bed" EP	2019, PIAS
Ten Fé	"Future Perfect, Present Tense"	2019, Some Kinda Love
Palace	"Life After"	2019, Fiction
Keaton Henson	"Monument"	2020, PIAS
Keaton Henson	"Fragments" EP	2021, PIAS
Blanketman	"National Trust" EP	2021
Everything Everything	"Man Alive"	2023, Universal
Puma Blue	"Holy Waters"	2023, Blue Flowers
Sailor Honeymoon	"Sailor Honeymoon"	2024, Good Good
Charlie Cunningham	"In Light"	2025, Kartel
Ten Fé	"Stil In Love"	2025, Some Kinda Love
Shura	"I Got To Sad For My Friends"	2025

=== Performance and music direction ===
Smith is a multi-instrumentalist and provides guitar and keyboard performances, amongst other instruments played by him, on nearly all of his productions.

Smith was appointed and worked as the musical director of Lily Allen's Sheezus world tour which played in the UK, Europe, US and Australia. He played guitar live as well as being responsible for the show's music at large. In 2019, Luke worked on musical direction for the Raconteurs.

He has scored the music for a number of film, radio and TV projects.

=== Remixing ===
Smith is well known for his remix work including his remixes of "Hotride" by The Prodigy and "After Dark" by Le Tigre in 2004, Perfume by Sparks in 2006, "Nothing But Green Lights" by Tom Vek and "Sister In Love" by Envelopes in 2005, "X-ray" by The Maccabees (band), "Behave" by Charlotte Hatherley and "Reactor Party" by Shitdisco in 2006, "Benedict Arnold" by FrYars in 2008. Smith going under the name Lagos Boys Choir also remixed the hit singles "Focker" by Late Of The Pier, "Bullet Proof" by La Roux and "Miles Away" by Depeche Mode throughout 2008 and 2009.

=== Nominations and awards ===
In 2010, the album Sounds of the Universe was nominated and shortlisted for the Best Alternative Music Album award in the 52nd Annual Grammy Awards.

In 2010, the album Total Life Forever was nominated for the prestigious Mercury Prize.

His work Spanish Sahara, the lead single off the album, won the 'Best Song' award at the NME Awards in 2011.
