= Salad (band) =

British band

- Also known as: The Merry Babes
- Origin: London, England
- Genres: Britpop
- Years active: 1992–1998, 2017–present
- Labels: Island, Three Bean
- Members: Marijne van der Vlugt; Paul Kennedy; Donald Ross Skinner; Jon Hunt
- Past members: Rob Wakeman; Charley Stone; Pete Brown
- Website: saladband.com

Salad are an alternative rock group formed in London in 1992. Their initial line-up was Dutch vocalist/keyboardist Marijne van der Vlugt, guitarist Paul Kennedy, bassist Pete Brown and drummer Rob Wakeman (ex-Colenso Parade). In 1996, Charley Stone (later of Gay Dad) joined the band as a live guitarist, keyboard player and backing vocalist. The band disbanded in 1998 and reformed in 2017.

== Biography ==
Van der Vlugt had previously worked as a model, but rose to prominence as a video jockey for MTV Europe. Initially performing as The Merry Babes with her then-boyfriend and guitarist Paul Kennedy, the addition of Pete Brown on bass and Rob Wakeman on drums resulted in the creation of Salad in 1992. Songwriting duties were mainly borne by Kennedy and van der Vlugt, with significant contributions from Wakeman who was also responsible for sampling. Distinctive parts of Salad's sound include the Kawai K1 synthesizer (always present on stage next to van der Vlugt during live performances) and Kennedy's backing vocals.

Their first two releases, the Kent EP and "Diminished Clothes", were released on their own Waldorf label and gained them significant coverage in the music press and the main support slot on Blur's Sugary Tea tour in late 1993. This led to a deal with Island Records, initially on the 'indie' sub-label Island Red. Another EP (On A Leash) followed and all three singles together with their B-sides were subsequently released on the compilation album Singles Bar (1994). Their first purposely recorded album, Drink Me (1995), reached No. 16 of the UK Albums Chart and four of its tracks were released as singles, "Motorbike to Heaven" just missing out on a top 40 placing in the UK Singles Chart. The next release was the non-album single "I Want You" in 1996, a year which also saw the addition of Charley Stone as a second guitarist for live appearances only. Their second album Ice Cream (1997) failed to match the success of the first and the band were subsequently dropped by Island and disbanded in 1998.

Van der Vlugt later formed Cowboy Racer, whose song "Yellow Horse" featured on the US television show, Grey's Anatomy. Pete Brown and Rob Wakeman established the popular entertainment site, BoreMe, which Pete Brown now runs on his own. Charley Stone went on to play in a number of bands, most notably Gay Dad. Rob Wakeman released a few Tech House and Techno singles between 1999 and 2002, including Legs With Wings on City Rockers (2002). Wakeman, together with Jo Addison, formed the band Lapwing in 1999 and appeared on various compilation albums from record labels including Mind Horizon Recordings and Dishy.

In 2016, Van der Vlugt and Kennedy began performing Salad songs acoustically as Salad Undressed. They also performed their first radio session in 19 years at Phoenix FM in Brentwood. The duo, now joined by long time collaborator Donald Ross Skinner released an album entitled Good Love Bad Love in March 2018 – their first as Salad Undressed.

In 2017, the band announced that they would be playing two dates as a full electric band (with original bassist Pete Brown, guitarist Charley Stone and drummer Donald Ross Skinner joining van der Vlugt and Kennedy) in London before releasing a new Salad single in 2018 called The Selfishness of Love and a brand new album as a full band. Their third album The Salad Way was released on 30 August 2019 via independent music distribution company, ‘Republic of Music’ to widespread critical acclaim.

During several lockdowns the band laid low with van der Vlugt appearing on Facebook live doing her own version of listening parties on selected Friday nights through 2020 and 2021. In May 2021 Salad reverted to a four piece after Charley Stone left the band to focus on her solo career. August 2021 saw the release of the single "Things in Heaven" along with a moody black and white video featuring van der Vlugt, crawling out of the sea like a primordial being. They resumed playing live again towards the end of 2021 and continue to do so with plans to release new material along the way. In January 2022 bass player Pete Brown left the band and was replaced by Jon Hunt.

== Discography ==
=== Studio albums ===
- Drink Me (1995) – UK No. 16
- Ice Cream (1997) – UK No. 127
- The Salad Way (2019)

=== Compilations ===
- Singles Bar (May 1994) – The first three singles
- The Lost Album, Vol. 1 (2017)
- Good Love Bad Love (2018 as "Salad Undressed")
- The Lost Album, Vol. 2 (2019)

=== Singles ===
Title	Year	Chart positions	Album
Title	Year	UK	Album
Kent EP	June 1993	—	
Diminished Clothes	November 1993	—	
"On a Leash"	April 1994	85	
"Your Ma"	July 1994	82	Drink Me
"Drink The Elixir"	February 1995	66	Drink Me
"Motorbike to Heaven"	May 1995	42	Drink Me
"Granite Statue"	August 1995	50	Drink Me
"I Want You"	October 1996	60	
"Cardboy King"	May 1997	65	Ice Cream
"Yeah Yeah"	August 1997	84	Ice Cream
"Being Human"	July 2017	—	Good Love Bad Love (as "Salad Undressed")
"Evergreen"	May 2018	—	Good Love Bad Love (as "Salad Undressed")
"The Selfishness Of Love"	November 2018	—	
"Under The Wrapping Paper"	June 2019	—	The Salad Way
"You Got The Job"	July 2019	—	The Salad Way
"Details"	February 2020	—	The Salad Way
"Things in Heaven"	August 2021	—	
"I Didn't Know You'd Gone"	March 2023	—	

=== Other works ===
- Dream a Little Dream of Me (May 1995) – with Terry Hall for the War Child charity project, The Help Album
- Back Street Luv (1996) – on the Childline charity album.
- Girl Don't Come (1996) – with Sandie Shaw on The White Room (video on YouTube)
