= Marijne van der Vlugt =

Dutch musician

Marijne van der Vlugt (born 6 October 1965 in De Meije) is a Dutch musician, former model and MTV Europe VJ. She is the daughter of Dutch actor Bram van der Vlugt.

Van der Vlugt started her career as a VJ for MTV Europe Central from London in the early 1990s and hosted such shows as Alternative Nation (every Wednesday from 23:00), and the fashion show The Pulse with Swatch. She also often did the voiceovers for the night-time videos and her voice was used in some MTV adverts.

After MTV decided to close down pan-European broadcasting from London in 1997, MTV Network Productions went regional. MTV began offering channels for individual countries, like MTV Italy, MTV Germany, MTV France, MTV Sweden, and MTV Russia. Marijne van der Vlugt's career as an MTV presenter ended at that point.

At the same time, van der Vlugt was the lead singer of alternative band Salad, a UK based band that was active from 1992 to 1998. She later performed with the rock band Cowboy Racer, who are perhaps best known for their song "Yellow Horse" that was featured on the hit American TV show Grey's Anatomy. Cowboy Racer broke up in 2011. In 2016, she began working with Paul Kennedy as Salad Undressed, and in 2017 the full line-up of Salad reformed.

Van der Vlugt cameoed on Never Mind the Buzzcocks in 2023.
