= Charlotte Hatherley =

British musician

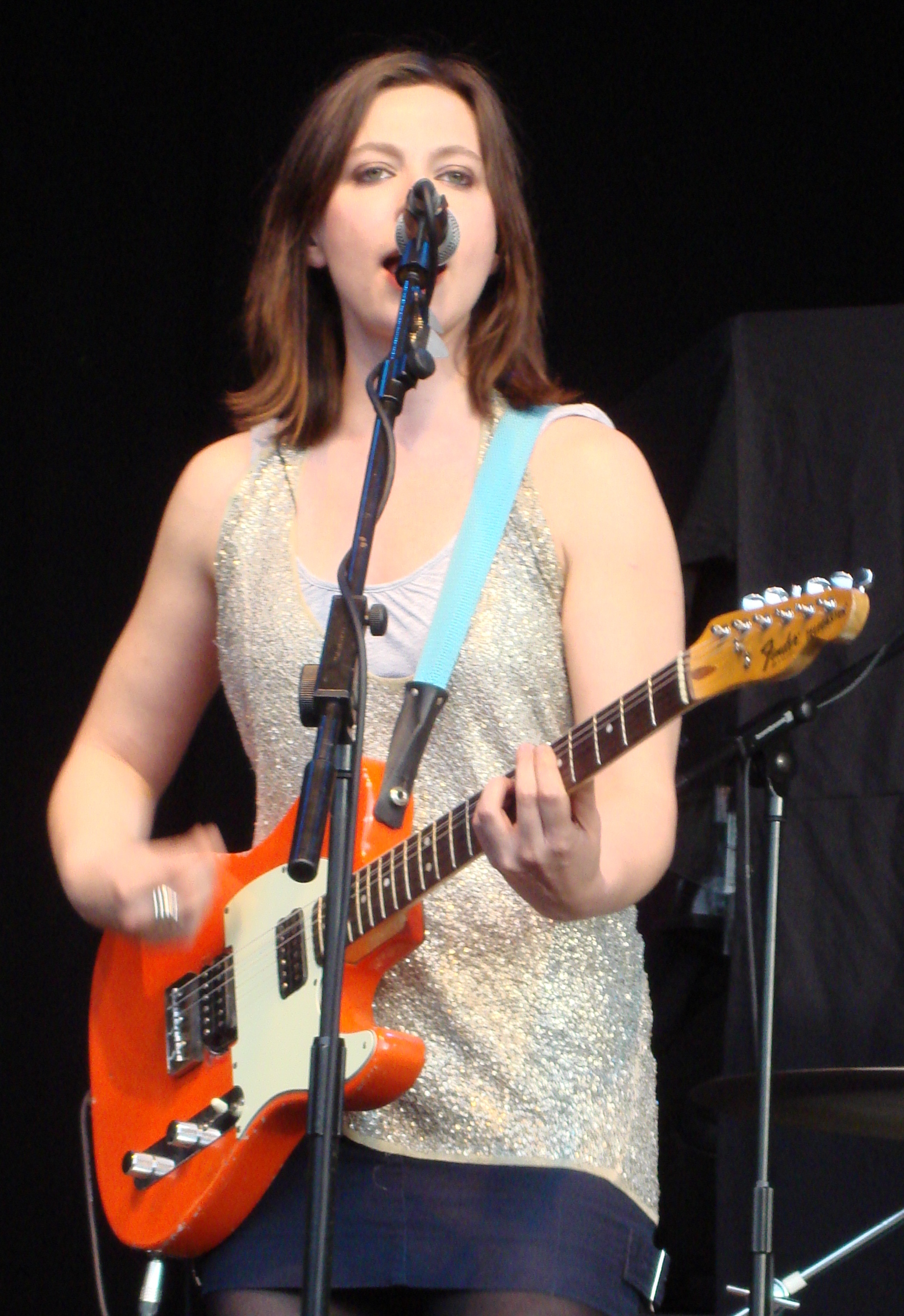
- Hatherley in 2007

Background information
- Born: 20 June 1979 (age 46)
- Origin: London, England
- Genres: Alternative rock; electropop
- Occupations: Musician; songwriter; composer
- Instruments: Vocals; guitar; keyboards
- Years active: 1997–present
- Labels: Infectious; Double Dragon; Little Sister; Minty Fresh

Charlotte Franklin Hatherley (born 20 June 1979) is an English singer, guitarist and songwriter. She initially came to prominence as guitarist and backing vocalist for alternative rock band Ash. Since leaving Ash in 2006, she has worked as a solo artist and acted as a touring musician for Bryan Ferry, KT Tunstall, Bat for Lashes, Cold Specks, Rosie Lowe and Birdy. Hatherley has also been a touring member of NZCA Lines and was the musical director for South African artist Nakhane.

== Early life ==
Hatherley's mother, Patricia Franklin, is an actress. Her father, Frank Hatherley, is an Australian playwright and critic.

== Career ==
=== Ash (1997–2006) ===
Born in London, Hatherley's music career began at the age of 15, when she joined British punk band Nightnurse. Two years later, Ash was looking for a guitarist to add to their live sound, and they hired Hatherley after frontman Tim Wheeler saw her play at a Nightnurse show. Hatherley's Ash debut was at Belfast's Limelight on 10 August 1997, and the following week the new lineup played the 1997 V Festival in front of 50,000 people. Her recording career with the band began later that year on the single "A Life Less Ordinary" and continued on the album Nu-Clear Sounds in 1998.

Hatherley was a full-time member of Ash for eight years, playing on three studio albums, and wrote a handful of the band's songs, most notably "Grey Will Fade", on the B-side of the single "There's a Star". The song was a cult favourite among fans, and eventually became the title track of Hatherley's debut solo album. On 20 January 2006 it was announced that Hatherley would be leaving Ash in an amicable breakup.

She reunited with the band in 2022 for a UK tour to support the 21st anniversary of Free All Angels.

=== Solo (2004–present) ===
While recording the album Meltdown with Ash, Hatherley began to record her own album Grey Will Fade. From the album she released the singles "Bastardo", "Summer" (both videos directed by Edgar Wright), and "Kim Wilde", which all received high praise from critics.

Hatherley's second album The Deep Blue was released on 5 March 2007. It was preceded by two singles; "Behave", in December, and "I Want You To Know" along with an accompanying UK and Ireland tour. For Nokia Online, David Bowie reviewed "Behave", writing, 'Behave is proof that Charlotte made the right decision to go solo. The guitar part is an instant hook, that has a kind of Eno-esque quirkiness about it... Impossibly catchy, you'll find this popping into your head when you least expect it'. Two more singles were released to promote the album, "Siberia" and "Again". In 2007, Hatherley opened for Blondie on their UK tour.

Hatherley's third solo album New Worlds was released in October 2009. Pitchfork gave the album 8.0, writing, 'Hatherley is a meticulous artist, and her songs are carefully constructed things designed for a powerful dynamic impact without sacrificing elegance and grace. She's the best sort of craft-driven writer, consistently avoiding ostentatious displays of technical ingenuity while subtly exerting her skill in ways that call attention to, rather than distract from, her melodies.' The album was also The Sunday Times' record of the week: 'These are sensational songs, from an artist who remains bafflingly overlooked, but continues to dive into that tiny pool and come up bearing pearls.'

In February 2012, Hatherley began performing under the name of Sylver Tongue. She released the Something Big EP in November 2012. Sylver Tongue supported Bat for Lashes on their October/November 2012 UK tour.

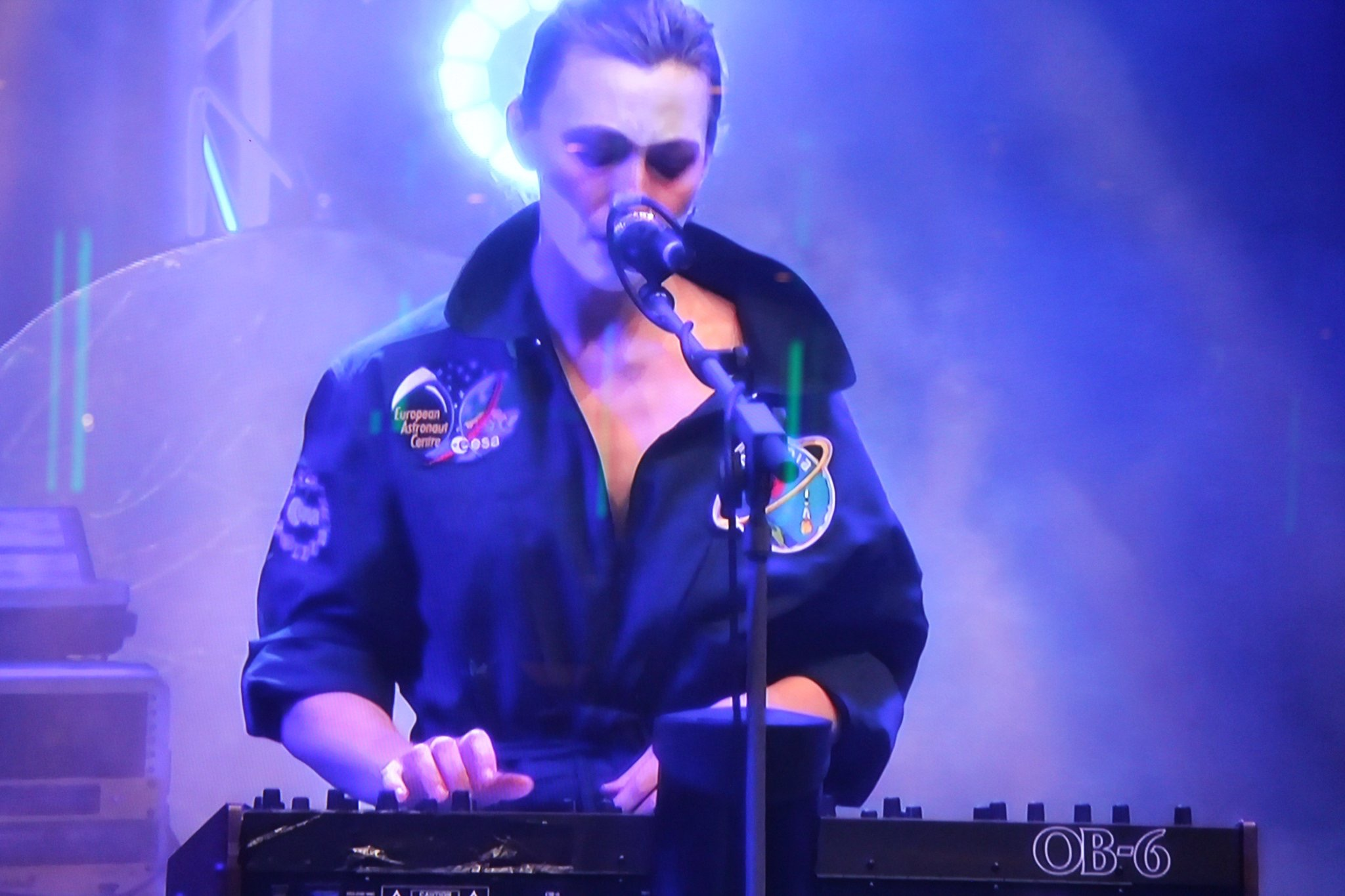
Hatherley performing in 2018

In 2017, Hatherley pre-released a solo album via PledgeMusic called True Love. Inspired by her love of science fiction, the album tells the story of Traveller, a heartbroken alien searching for love. It received a 4/5 star review in The Evening Standard. Their critic wrote, 'Vangelis's Blade Runner soundtrack is the obvious inspiration behind these ethereal soundscapes, although this is much more than derivative, fangirl fare. "A Sign" and "Hook You Up" are glorious pop songs in their own right, while Hatherley's yearning vocals ensure that even the most robotic moments retain a compelling human core.' The album was officially released in June 2018. Electronic Sound magazine wrote: 'This is an album easy to fall in love with, from the yearning 'A Sign' to the gorgeous 'You Said Goodbye' its electronic teardrops and emotional nakedness could soundtrack any broken love affair'.

Three singles were released from the record, "A Sign", "Night Vision" and "Hook You Up". The five-track Night Vision EP contained cover versions of songs from cinema, including the Bee Gees' "How Deep Is Your Love", the video for which was made in collaboration with the European Space Agency.

=== Film and theatre scoring (2013–present) ===
Hatherley wrote the score for director Gavin Rothery's sci-fi short film The Last Man. It premiered at the FrightFest festival in London in 2014. She performed the score at the British Film Institute as part of their major three-month focus on sci-fi on screen, Days of Fear and Wonder. In 2014, she also composed the music for Stella Feehily's play This May Hurt a Bit, directed by Max Stafford-Clark.

In 2019, Hatherley composed the score for the film Imogen which was due to premiere at Oscar qualifying film festival AMDOCS in Palm Springs on 27 March 2020 as part of the Official Selection (postponed due to COVID-19). Produced by Margo Mars and Alma Har'el, the film is directed by Lola Young and Matt Shea and supported by the BFI Doc Society and LUSH film fund. The soundtrack was released in May 2020.

In 2021, she played guitars on composer Frank Ilfman's score for the film Gunpowder Milkshake. In 2022, she contributed to the score for director Peter Strickland's film Flux Gourmet.

=== Collaborative work ===
In 2007, Hatherley was a touring guitarist for Bryan Ferry, and in 2009 joined Bat for Lashes as a live member of the band.

In 2010, Hatherley joined KT Tunstall's band, playing lead guitar. The 2010/11 tour coincided with the release of Tunstall's Tiger Suit album. In an interview with the Galway Advertiser, Tunstall said that Hatherley had helped her 'to find the voice that she had always been searching for.' "Charlotte has just blown us all away. She's an exceptionally talented musician and very visceral. It's just pure emotion when she plays." Hatherley has subsequently recorded guitar on Tunstall's albums Kin and Wax and played guitar on her 2018 tour.

During 2015/2016, Hatherley was a performing member of Cold Specks and NZCA Lines, and throughout 2016/2017 toured as guitarist/keyboardist for Birdy coinciding with the release of Birdy's Beautiful Lies album. In 2019 Hatherley played for Frank Turner, and played on Fred Deakin's album The Lasters.

From 2017 to 2020, Hatherley was musical director, guitarist and keyboardist for South African artist Nakhane.

In 2021, Hatherley played on Imelda May's album 11 Past the Hour and Natalie Imbruglia's Firebird. During 2023 she played as part of Birdy's live band for the Portraits tour.

Across Summer 2024 she played in Bat For Lashes' live band for the Dream Of Delphi tour in the UK and Europe.

== Personal life ==
Since late 2016, Hatherley has been in a relationship with artist and Empire features editor Alex Godfrey. They have a daughter, Rosa Mars, born late June 2020.

Hatherley was in a relationship with director Edgar Wright from 2002 which lasted for several years. Hatherley's mother, Patricia Franklin, also appeared in all three films of Wright's Three Flavours Cornetto trilogy.

== Discography ==
=== Albums ===
Year	Album	UK
2004	Grey Will Fade: Released: 16 August 2004; Label: Double Dragon Records	51
2007	The Deep Blue: Released: 5 March 2007; Label: Little Sister	109
2009	New Worlds: Released: 16 October 2009; Label: Little Sister, Minty Fresh	–
2017	True Love: Released: May 2017; Label: Sylver Tongue Records	–

=== Singles ===
Year	Title	Album	UK	B-sides
2004	"Kim Wilde" (Download-only)	Grey Will Fade	—	
2004	"Summer"	Grey Will Fade	31	Commodore; SMUT
2005	"Bastardo"	Grey Will Fade	31	3 Minutes; I Am a Kamera
2006	"Behave"	The Deep Blue	168	Mr. Ed; Cousteau (Extended Version); Behave (Luke Smith Clor Remix)
2007	"I Want You to Know"	The Deep Blue	108	Sister Universe; Suspiria
2007	"Siberia"	The Deep Blue	—	Last Night; This Is Pop; I Don't Need Anyone
2007	"Again"	The Deep Blue	—	Again (acoustic)
2007	"CH V FD (Deep Blue remixes)"	Non-album single	—	Dawn Treader (Fredmix); It Isn't Over (Fredmix)
2009	"White"	New Worlds	—	White (Squarepusher Remix); White (Adem Remix); White (Heartbeat Remix)
2009	"Alexander"	New Worlds	—	Alexander (Radio Edit); Alexander (Blacknred Remix)

=== Music videos ===
Title	Year	Director	Notes
"Summer"	2004	Edgar Wright	
"Bastardo"	2005	Edgar Wright	
"Behave"	2006	Oscar Wright	
"I Want You to Know"	2007	Joe Cornish	
"Siberia"	2007	Shelly Love	
"White"	2009	Elliot Manches	
"Alexander"	2009	Elliot Manches	
"A Sign"	2017	Gavin Rothery	
"Night Vision"	2017	John Minton	Lyrics video
"How Deep Is Your Love"	2018	Mike Keelin	In collaboration with ESA
"Hook You Up"	2018	Rik Moran	
