= Gay Dad =

English rock band

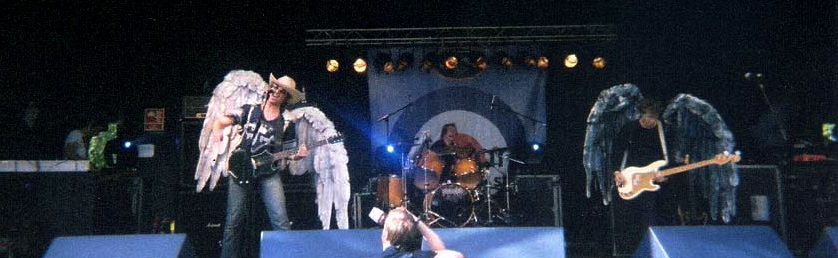
- Gay Dad at Mardi Gras; 30 June 2001

Background information
- Origin: London, England
- Genres: Post-Britpop, alternative rock, indie rock
- Years active: 1994–2002
- Label: London/B-Unique
- Past members: Cliff Jones; Nicholas "Baz" Crowe; Andrew Smith; Tim Forster (Nigel) George Hoyle; James Riseboro; Charley Stone; Tim Forster; Dominic Stinton; Denise Johnson

Gay Dad were an English rock band that formed in London in 1994 and broke up in 2002. The line-up of the band has included Cliff Jones (guitarist/vocalist), Nick "Baz" Crowe (drummer), James Risebero (keyboardist), Nigel George Hoyle (bassist) and Charley Stone.

== Musical career ==
=== Early history ===
Gay Dad were formed in 1994 by former Mojo and The Face journalist Cliff Jones and art magazine publisher Nick Crowe (drums), along with friends they had known in Berkshire as teenagers, Dominic S (vocals), Tim Forster (keyboards), and bassist Nigel George Hoyle, who had originally played in a band called Brutus with S a year or two earlier. Jones, S, Forster and Crowe had played together in various incarnations of what was to become Gay Dad ten years previously, such as The Timothy and the Astral Projection Society. Known recordings include the track 'Freaking out in Sunninghill Sky St' (sic) which was made available as a limited edition cassette in the late 1980s.

The first Gay Dad demo was produced by Jim Irvin (writer and former frontman of Furniture) and funded by the Rolling Stones' former record producer and manager, Andrew Loog Oldham with his original business partner in the Immediate label, Tony Calder. Jones had met with Calder and Oldham, who were convinced by a performance at the band's rehearsal room to sign the band.

Gay Dad made their live debut in 1995 at the Orange Club in West Kensington, London.

Following a band reshuffle, Crowe invited fellow Liverpool University graduate James Riseboro to play keyboards, and the band recorded three new tracks at Raezor Studio, Wandsworth, during autumn 1996 including a song called "To Earth with Love". Though only intended to win them some live dates, the demo attracted keen record-label interest from Island, Chrysalis, Mercury, EMI and others. These included London, to whom they signed in December 1997.

=== "To Earth with Love" (1998) ===
With Charley Stone (formerly of Salad) joining as a live guitarist to add some of the overdubbed guitar parts from their multi-layered sound, they toured the UK in early 1998, before starting recording sessions at RAK Studios in Regents Park with the record producer Tony Visconti and engineer Mark Frith who had co-produced the demos that got the band signed. Visconti co-produced (with the band and Frith) the track "To Earth with Love," before he was sacked. The album sessions relocated to The Dairy studio in Brixton with producers/sound engineers Gary Langan (ex-Art of Noise) and Chris Hughes. Meanwhile, test pressings of the first single, made for the label bosses and marketing team at London, found their way to DJ Mark Radcliffe, then presenting on BBC Radio 1. They began to play the test pressings and London had to plan a rush release.

The band were the first act ever to play Top of the Pops without having a record out. They also performed on TFI Friday and CD:UK.

The band generated a huge amount of interest from the media, and Gay Dad were hailed as the "saviours" of British rock by magazines such as Select and Melody Maker. Some critics claimed that the over-the-top hype was an example of nepotism in the industry at the time, as band leader Cliff Jones had only recently stopped working in the music press himself. The band appeared on the covers of both Melody Maker and the NME, as well as that of Select.

"To Earth with Love" was finally released as the band's debut single in January 1999. It entered the UK Singles Chart at No. 10. In an interview in March 2001 with Channel Fly, Jones stated that despite the critical success of their album and commercial success of their debut single, he would never want to re-live 1999 ever again claiming he would "rather live in a cave in Spain."

=== Leisure Noise period (1999–2000) ===
Gay Dad's debut album Leisure Noise, co-produced by Chris Hughes and Mark Frith, was released in June 1999. Despite initial good reviews it only made No. 14 in the UK, but American sales topped 25,000. The band performed in June at Glastonbury Festival. and in July they supported the Stereophonics in Morfa Stadium, Swansea.

The second single, "Joy!", reached No. 22 in the UK, but the third single from the album, "Oh Jim", only made No. 47. Disappointing reviews for some of their live shows started a general media backlash. Jones was criticized for his pretentious statements, and the band's whole authenticity was questioned due to his connections with the music press. After a U.S. tour Stone left the band and was on the verge of being replaced by Andy Bell, former guitarist with Ride, who had seen the band play a sell-out show in Stockholm. Liam Gallagher heard of Bell's plan and asked him to join Oasis.

The band started to work on a second album at The Cure's Parkgate studios in Sussex but keyboard-player Riseboro left soon after due to musical differences. The band also parted from London Records the following November, with their A&R man Mark Lewis.

=== Transmission period (2001–2002) ===
Jones, Hoyle and Crowe signed a recording contract with new independent record label B-Unique, set up by their former A&R man at London Records, Mark Lewis, and began work on a new album, Transmission.

"GAY DAD ARE POST EMBARRASSMENT".

— Transmission, Sleeve notes.

In 2001, the leading single from Transmission – "Now Always and Forever" – was released. It fell just short of the Top 40 in the UK Singles Chart. An extensive UK tour was followed by a limited-edition single "Harder, Faster". Third single "Transmission" was released just before the album came out in late 2001.

Gay Dad played a one-off show in Houston, Texas in the summer of 2001. It was at this show that Jones shared a bill with up-and-coming Austin band Young Heart Attack. Smitten with the energy and drive of the band, Jones struck up a friendship with them and played a key role in getting the band signed in England. A new song, "Young Heart Attack", later appeared as a b-side to one of the singles from Transmission.

The Carling Festival saw the band's final two full appearances headlining the New Bands Tent. Their Leeds appearance was initially delayed by technical issues and then was cut short by the stage hands. In response Jones smashed his guitar and led the crowd in an a cappella version of "Joy!".

Having left the stage to the crowd chanting their name the previous two nights, their Reading appearance saw people attempting to cram into a full tent. The set was successful with the band able to perform "Joy!" with a crowd sing-along, in a less ad-hoc nature.

=== Band split ===
Rumours of a split started circulating in 2002, and Jones finally announced the breakup of the band on the eve of the U.S. release of Transmission, citing the excessive press hype the band had received and the pressures resulting from it, as well as negative reactions to the band's controversial name. "We got shot out of the cannon," said Jones, "then things started to get out of control, and as rapidly as we went up, we came down again."

Jones claimed that one negative reaction came from Capitol Records, which had planned to release the album in America. "Someone in radio promotion said he'd resign if he had to work with a band called Gay Dad." A year later Crowe spoke to an ex-Capitol Records executive who confirmed the label had scuppered the deal because of the band's unacceptable name. Instead, Transmission was put out by indie label Thirsty Ear.

Later that year Gay Dad's second single, "Joy!" was used in a Mitsubishi car advertisement, the football video game FIFA 2000, and TV shows including Randall and Hopkirk (Deceased) and The Naked Chef.

Following the split, Jones went into production and co-songwriting working with The Electric Soft Parade, Sia, Scanners, Lovebites, Jamie Dornan, The Applicators, Faceless Warewolves, The Golden Virgins, and Mark Owen (though nothing was ever released with Owen). He occasionally writes on music for The Sunday Times. He is also tutoring at the Bristol Institute of Modern Music.

Crowe went on to write for Prospect magazine, contributing music criticism and essays, while bringing up his children on a small holding on Exmoor.

Hoyle eventually ended up working with Freelance Hellraiser recording a track for the Ian Brown remix album. He then worked with Dylan Rippon and Crispin Hunt (of the defunct Longpigs) in a new band called Gramercy. The band posted numerous songs on their website then split up (just before they were to release their debut EP Hold On through Redemption Records). In 2009 he released a solo album as Nigel Of Bermondsey on Pure Mint records.

== Discography ==
=== Albums ===
- Leisure Noise (1999) – UK No. 14
- Transmission (2001)

=== Singles ===
- 1999: "To Earth with Love" – UK No. 10
- 1999: "Joy!" – UK No. 22
- 1999: "Oh Jim" – UK No. 47
- 2001: "Now Always and Forever" – UK No. 41
- 2001: "Harder Faster" – Did not chart (special limited edition tour single, 2000 CD, 500 7" available for one week only)
- 2001: "Transmission" – UK No. 58
