= Hyperbubble discography =

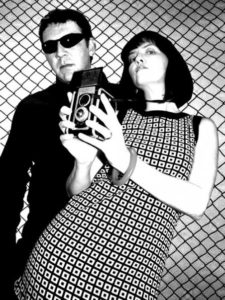
- Publicity photo for Hyperbubble's release of Drastic Cinematic
- Studio albums: 6
- EPs: 9
- Soundtrack albums: 3
- Live albums: 1
- Compilation albums: 5
- Singles: 19
- Music videos: 8
- Mix albums: 3

Visual and performing arts electropop/synthpop band Hyperbubble released 6 studio albums, 1 live album, 3 compilation albums, 9 extended plays, 19 singles, 2 soundtracks and 3 mix albums. They also released 8 music videos.

The San Antonio, Texas band was formed by Jeff DeCuir and Jess Barnett DeCuir. Hyperbubble released their debut album Sol!d Pop in 2004.

== Albums ==
=== Studio albums ===
Title	Album details
Sol!d Pop	Released: November 4, 2004; Label: Socket Sounds; Formats: CD and digital download
Airbrushed Alibis	Released: December 14, 2007; Label: Filthy Little Angels (UK); Formats: CD and digital download
Candy Apple Daydreams	Released: February 14, 2010; Label: Bubblegum Records (UK); Formats: CD and digital download
Drastic Cinematic	Released: April 2, 2011^{[A]}; Label: Pure Pop For Now People (Germany); Formats: LP
Music to Color By	Released: April 4, 2016; Label: Pure Pop For Now People; Formats: CD and digital download^{[B]}
Western Ware	Released: February 26, 2017; Label: Fellowshipwreck Music; Formats: CD and digital download

- A The black vinyl was limited to 100 copies with handmade covers.
- B "The CD was released with a coloring book entitled, "Coloring Book Concert". It featured original art by the band.

=== Live albums ===
Title	Album details
Live in London	Released: November 22, 2015; Label: Pure Pop For Now People; Formats: CD and digital download

=== Soundtracks ===
Title	Album details
Attack of the Titans	Released: July 31, 2014; Label: Pure Pop For Now People; Formats: CD and digital download
Dee Dee Rocks the Galaxy	Released: November 21, 2015; Label: Pure Pop For Now People; Formats: CD and digital download
Cowgirls and Synthesizers	Released: 2024; Label: ArtLabTX Films (US); Formats: yellow vinyl 12" LP, CD and digital download

=== Compilation albums ===
Title	Album details
Textronix Mix Tape	Released: 2007; Label: Filthy Little Angels; Formats: digital download
Drastic Cinematic – The Director's Cut^{[A]}	Released: July 1, 2011; Label: Bubblegum Records; Formats: CD and digital download
Pretty Plastic	Released: July 17, 2017; Label: Fellowshipwreck; Formats: CD and digital download
Love and Bionics	Released: August 20, 2020; Label: Pure Pop For Now People; Formats: digital download
The Singles	Released: June 20, 2025; Label: Socket Sounds (CD, digital), Kaniption Records (LP); Formats: neon green vinyl 12" LP, CD and digital download^{[B]}

- A The album is identical to Drastic Cinematic but with three additional tracks.
- B CD and LP came with a download card to access various remixes of all tracks.

=== Mix albums ===
Title	Album details
Sol!d Pop: The Rem!x Ed!t!on	Released: 2005^{[A]}; Label: Fellowshipwreck Music; Formats: digital download
Airbrushed Alibis in Dub	Released: January 1, 2008; Label: Filthy Little Angels; Formats: digital download
Candy Apple Nightmares	Released: October 31, 2010; Label: Bubblegum Records; Formats: digital download

- A The album also had a limited release in 2005 on CD produced by Socket Sounds.

=== Extended plays ===
List of extended plays
Title	Album details
Untitled with S/T^{[A]}	Released: October 2004; Label: Save Our Sperms Records; Formats: CD
Untitled with ShiSho^{[B]}	Released: May 13, 2007; Label: Filthy Little Angels; Formats: 7-inch
Synesthesia	Released: May 19, 2008; Label: Filthy Little Angels; Formats: digital download
Christmas with The Bee Gees	Released: December 2008; Label: Fellowshipwreck Music; Formats: digital download
Better Set Your Phasers to Stun featuring Helen Love	Released: July 1, 2009; Label: Bubblegum Records (UK); Formats: CD and digital download
Rollerboogie Babydoll	Released: August 23, 2009; Label: Filthy Little Angels; Formats: digital download
Hyperbubble + Manda Rin with Manda Rin	Released: February 14, 2013; Label: Pure Pop For Now People; Formats: CD and digital download
Better Set Your Phasers To Stun – The Next Generation featuring Helen Love	Released: 2014^{[C]}; Label: Socket Sounds; Formats: CD
Queen of the Universe^{[D]}	Released: November 21, 2015; Label: Fellowshipwreck Music; Formats: digital download

- A EP is referred to by each band respectively as s/t hyperbubble split EP and Hyperbubble + ST and by Discogs after track 1, Minicar.
- B The album has tracks by ShiSho on side A and Hyperbubble on side B. It was a pink vinyl released as part of Filthy Little Angels' Singles Club package of five split-EPs. Subsequently, the record cataloged FILTHY 006 was sold as a standalone. The band later sold it under the title of its featured song, "Supermarket Casanova", which later appears on Airbrushed Alibis.
- C Limited hand-numbered edition of 100 copies, twenty-five of which were sold via Facebook. The remainder were sold at a November 22, 2014 concert with Hyperbubble at The Lexington that was recorded and released as the album, Live in London.
- D Includes tracks from Dee Dee Rocks the Galaxy.

== Singles ==
Title	Year	Album
"You Spin Me Round"/"You Spin Me Remix"	2004	Non-album single
"Leon (Catnip Remix)"	2006	Sol!d Pop: The Rem!x Ed!t!on
"Nervous System (Ozzytronic Moog Meltdown Mix)"	2008	Remixes of tracks on Airbrushed Alibis
"Rollerboogie Babydoll (All-Skate Dub)"	2008	Remixes of tracks on Airbrushed Alibis
"Rollergirl Megamix featuring Hyperbubble + Occupant + Octavia Leito + Femme Fatality"	2008	Remixes of tracks on Airbrushed Alibis
"Welcome to Infinity (Singles Only Mix)"/"Welcome to Infinity (Extended Remix by I European)"	2011	Pretty Plastic / Drastic Cinematic – Director's Cut
"It's a Lovely Day (Bionic Bubblepunk Version)"	2013	Non-album singles
'"Fist in the Mirror/Fist in the Mirror (Deconstructed Mix)" with Aidan Casserly^{[A]}	2013	Non-album singles
"A Synthesizer for Christmas"	2013	Non-album singles
"Sky Smasher"/"Son of Sky Smasher"	2014	Attack of the Titans / Pretty Plastic

- A The double single was called "Aidan Casserly Vs. Hyperbubble".

=== Remix singles ===
Title	Artist	Year	Album
"Duct Tape My Heart (Remix)"	Freezepop	2005	Non-album singles
"Midnight's Calling (Way Past Your Bedtime Mix)"	Wytebred	2005	Non-album singles
"Aliona (Super Stellar Remix)"	The Metrosexuals	2006	Textronix Mix Tape
"Dance or Die (Disco de Los Muertos Remix)"	Femme Fatality	2006	Non-album singles
"Goof (Freeway Mix)"	Binaerpilot	2006	Non-album singles
"Lord of the Ramps (Dirty Luck Remix)"	Cherry 2000	2007	Non-album singles
"Sometimes (Hyperbubble Mix)"	Kilna	2007	Non-album singles
"Gentil Meussieu (Remix)"	Rocky Controlo	2008	Gentil Meussieu
"Honey On (Hyperbubble Remix)"	Orangey	2011	Pretty Plastic

== Various artist compilation albums ==
Title	Year	Album
"Starjacker"	1997	Acid Ranch 2000
"Dinner Tempo (Remix)"	2002	≥ (Greater Than or Equal to)
"I"	2003	The Schlong Remains the Same
"Vegetable Man"	2004	The Vegetable Man Project Vol. 3
"Shopping Cart Factory (Well Thirled Mix)"	2005	Rotten Remixes Vol. 2'
"Teen Dream (demo)"	2006	A Shoehorn Demo 2
"Don't Let Me Down (Anti-Gravity Remix)"	2006	Don't Let Me Down – Remixed
"You're the One That I Want"	2006	Down To GREASE On Holiday
"Stop! (Hyperbubble Remix)"	2006	Stop!
"Housewife's Lament"	2006	Patty Duke Fanzine No. 6: Love To Patty
"Away in a Manger"	2006	HARK! The Filthy Angels Sing
"Pop Goes The World"	2007	NineteenEightySeven
"Sugar, Sugar"	2007	Wreckollection – Fellowshipwreck Music's 10th Anniversary
"Christmas Riff"	2007	Tis The Season To Be Filthy
"Another Ride"	2007	Elektrowelt
"Away in a Manger"	2007	Electric Fantastic Christmas 2007
"Away in a Manger"	2007	The Filth Of Christmas Past
"Jamie's Cryin'"	2008	Nineteen78
"Another Ride"	2008	Masters of the Universe Vol. 3
"Party On Jupiter"	2008	Just A Minute
"Sushi Lover (Remix)"	2008	Sushi Lover
"Christmas With The Bee Gees (Maurice Mistletoe Mix)"	2008	Hidden Treasures
"Christmas With The Bee Gees (Robin Reindeer Mix)"	2008	Electric Fantastic Christmas 2008
"Christmas With The Bee Gees (Barry Gentlemen Mix)"	2008	It'll Be Filthy This Christmas
"U.F.O. Party Beach"	2009	Tribute to John Williams
"Hyperbubble mix"	2009	Stolearm – Jesus Missile Remixes
"I'm in Love with My Clone (Duplicate Mix)	2009	Fifth Dimension Volume 2
"No Anchovies Please"	2009	Covers & Sleevefaces
"Non Biodegradable Hazardous Waste Disposal (Valentino Mix)"	2009	My Filthy Valentine
*"Femme Fatality Vs Hyperbubble – Come On, Come Out"	2009	One's Not Enough Remixed
"Femme Fatality Vs Hyperbubble – Lucky Lover"	2009	One's Not Enough Remixed
"Non Biodegradable Hazardous Waste Disposal"	2009	Five Years Of Filth: Music vs Money
"Rudolph The Red Nosed Rocket"	2009	Electric Fantastic Christmas 2009
"Away in a Manger"	2009	Oh Come, All Ye Filthy
"Candy Apple Daydreams (Extended Remix)"	2010	electropop.5
"Teenage Timebomb (Hyperbubble's Bonaduce Mix)"	2010	Decade: 1999-2009 – Celebrating 10 Years of Ninthwave Records
"Teenage Timebomb (Hyperbubble's Bonaduce Mix)"	2010	Synthetic Dance Music Volume 2
"I Like Birds But I Like Other Animals Too"	2010	Pick 'n' Mix
"Jouet Pop"	2010	Jouet Pop
"Away in a Manger"	2010	Electric Fantastic Christmas 2010
"Starship 909"	2011	1'05
"Don't Break My Heart (Hyperbubble Remix)"	2011	Don't Break My Heart
"You Save My Life (Hyperbubble Remix)"	2011	You Save My Life
"You Lost Me at Hello (Aloha Mix)"	2011	Tesco Chainstore Mascara
"Kinky"	2011	Doppelhertz Vol. 2
"Western Ware"	2011	Western
"Gentil Meussieu (Hyperbubble Remix)"	2011	Gentil Meussieu
"Christmas Riff"	2011	Filthy Navidad
"Away In A Manger"	2011	Filthy Navidad
"Christmas With The Bee Gees (Barry Gentlemen Mix)"	2011	Filthy Navidad
"Victoria (Hyperbubble Remix)"	2012	Bad Breaks Remix EP
"Sky Smasher"	2014	Past Present Future 2
"Artificial Love (Love Remix by Hyperbubble)"	2017	Royal Visionaries – Remixed Fairytale
"Bionic Girl"	2018	Man & Machine
"(I'm Your) Satellite"	2020	THEREMIN100 Limited Vinyl Edition
"(I'm Your) Satellite"	2020	THEREMIN100
"Hologram (Hyperbubble Mix)"	2021	Hologram 2.0

== Guest appearances ==
Album	Year	Artist	Details	Ref.
Imposters	2005	Gracie DuVin	Music	
Down to Grease on Holiday	2006	Gracie DuVin	Music for "Sandy"	
Wreckollection – Fellowshipwreck Music's 10th Anniversary	2007	Gracie DuVin	Music for "Bad Blood"	
Solus	2009	The Gilliam Section	Beats and loops for "Solus"	
One's Not Enough	2008	Femme Fatality	Guest vocals for "Come On, Come Out"	
Enforced Fun	2016	Spray	Vocals for "The Very Nerve Centre Of Art/Video Cliche"	
Smitten 3-D Soundtrack	2017	The Simple Carnival	Guest vocals for "A Geek Like Me" and "Tornado"	

== Music videos ==
List of music videos, showing year released and director
Title	Year	Director(s)
"Mom Dad Un!t'"	2006	Hondo Aguilar
"Bionic Girl (featuring the AC Rollergirls)"	2007	Jeff DeCuir
"Christmas with the BeeGees"	2008	Jeff DeCuir
"Candy Apple Daydreams"	2010	Mark and Angela Walley
"Chop Shop Cop"	2010	Martin Keeler
"Explosive"	2013	Jeff DeCuir
"In the Movies"	2013	Jeff and Jess DeCuir
"A Synthesizer for Christmas"	2013	Ambar Navarro
"Banks of the Ohio"	2020	Jeff DeCuir

== Videography ==
=== Documentaries ===
- Cowgirls and Synthesizers (2023)
