= Angel Interceptor =

1995 single by Ash

Single by Ash

from the album 1977
- B-side: "5am Eternal"; "Gimme Some Truth"
- Released: 9 October 1995
- Genre: Space rock; pop rock
- Length: 4:04
- Label: Infectious
- Songwriter(s): Rick McMurray; Tim Wheeler
- Producer(s): Owen Morris

Ash singles chronology
"Girl from Mars" (1995)	"Angel Interceptor" (1995)	"Goldfinger" (1996)

"Angel Interceptor" is a song by Ash, released as the third single from their album 1977 on 9 October 1995. It was released as a single CD, a 7-inch vinyl, and as a cassette. The song was written by Rick McMurray and Tim Wheeler and produced by Owen Morris.

This song is meant to be one of the reasons Ash believed they needed a fourth, female member. Originally, the track's high-pitched backing vocals were performed by drummer Rick McMurray, but the band were unsatisfied with them. The title of the song is a reference to fictional aircraft featured in the 1960s sci-fi series Captain Scarlet and the Mysterons.

== Release and reception ==
"Angel Interceptor" gave Ash their second UK top-20 hit, reaching number 14 on the UK Singles Chart and number 1 on the indie chart. The single became Ash's second NME Single of the Week. The song can also be found on Ash's greatest hits collection, Intergalactic Sonic 7″s, and a live version of the song can be found on the Tokyo Blitz DVD.

== B-sides ==
"Angel Interceptor" was released with two B-sides. "5am Eternal" is thought to be one of Ash's stranger songs. It starts with wind-up toy noises, and consists of lyrics, with blurry vocals, centred on strange sound effects, with synthesizer effects as well.

B-side "Gimme Some Truth" is a cover of the electro-pop version of the John Lennon song from his Imagine album, originally performed by John Lennon & the Plastic Ono Band. The Japanese version of the single contains five B-sides: "Girl from Mars" and "Cantina Band" from the "Girl from Mars" single, "Kung Fu" and "Luther Ingo's Star Cruiser" from the "Kung Fu" single, and "Gimme Some Truth". The Japanese release was sold with picture sleeves, lyrics and an obi-strip.

== Music video ==
The video for the song was directed by Ash themselves, who put a high level of input into the video. It mainly consists of them playing in a yellow room, and occasionally messing about with stuff in the room. References to angels and rockets are occasionally made, such as a silhouette of an angel on a book at the start, and Tim reads a book on astrophysics.

== Track listings ==
UK CD, 7-inch, and cassette

1. "Angel Interceptor" (McMurray/Wheeler)
2. "5am Eternal" (Wheeler)
3. "Gimme Some Truth" (John Lennon)

Japanese CD

1. "Angel Interceptor" (McMurray/Wheeler)
2. "Girl from Mars" (Wheeler)
3. "Kung Fu" (Wheeler)
4. "Gimme Some Truth" (John Lennon)
5. "Cantina Band" (John Williams)
6. "Luther Ingo's Star Cruiser" (Hamilton/Wheeler)
