= Trailer (album) =

EP (mini-album) by Ash
- Released: 18 October 1994
- Recorded: March–June 1994
- Genre: Groove rock; noise rock; pop-punk
- Length: 24:15
- Label: Infectious
- Producer: Mark Waterman

Ash chronology
Trailer (1994)	1977 (1996)

Singles from Trailer
- 1. "Jack Names the Planets" Released: February 1994; 2. "Petrol" Released: 15 August 1994; 3. "Uncle Pat" Released: 17 October 1994

Trailer is a mini album by the band Ash featuring their first three singles. An expanded edition also includes four B-sides. The album was released in October 1994 through Infectious Records. The band considered it a "trailer" for their future debut album proper, and named it accordingly.

"Uncle Pat" was featured in a Heineken advert, which helped to raise the profile of the band, both in Ireland and Britain.

== Background ==
Trailer was produced by Mark Waterman. Tim Russell mixed "Season", "Intense Thing", "Uncle Pat" and "Get Out".

== Composition ==
Musically, the sound of Trailer has been tagged as groove rock, noise rock and pop-punk. AllMusic review Ralph Heibutzki suggested listeners should "imagine classic punk maneuvers crossed with Nirvana- and Dinosaur Jr.-style leanings, goosed by a bolt of Mega City Four". Author Dave Thompson wrote in his book Alternative Rock (2000): "A hint of Brit-pop savvy, a dash of older Indy-American fuzz, beaten and blended into something which cites The Buzzcocks as an influence, but can also sound like Black Sabbath." Dialogue was culled from fans Oscar Wilde and Patrick the Brewer for the recordings.

"Season", the opening track to Trailer, discusses the topics of love and suicide. Heibutzki said "Jack Names the Planets", alongside the bonus track "Punk Boy", "could give Green Day a run for its pop-punk roses". "Uncle Pat" details an exploration to a grave site via woods; Chris Molanphy, writing in CMJ New Music Monthly, remarked that the group "shows admirable restraint by pulling back the feedback at key points and letting the pretty notes ring out." Hot Press writer Liam Fay called "Petrol" an "unleaded geyser of melody, attitude and general weirdness". "Day of the Triffids" is named after the 1963 film of the same name, which Heibutzki felt "points to the band's love of all things extraterrestrial". Kayley Kravitz of Vanyaland said the chorus section, which includes elements of doo-wop, serves as a "stark contrast to a song that is otherwise about the annihilation of planet Earth by alien lifeforms."

The 'noise' at the end of the track "Get Out", when reversed, slowed down and the pitch altered, is a low quality demo version of the song "Intense Thing". This track wasn't discovered until June 2006 by 2 fans experimenting around with running different effects through Ash songs.

== Release ==
Trailer was issued in October 1994, during the emergence of Britpop; Wheeler said they were instead labelled under new wave of new wave. One vinyl repressing of it was issued with a 7" containing BBC recordings of "Silver Surfer" and "Jazz 59". Around this, Marshall was attended a CMJ convention in New York City, looking for potential options for the band in the United States. Of the various labels, Marshall said Tim Carr, the A&R vice-president of Reprise Records, was enthusiastic about the group "from Day One," going as far to fly to the UK to watch the band perform twice. By May 1995, Ash had signed to Reprise; the deal only covered North and South America, which differed from typical major label contracts with indie labels in the UK. It was intentional on Infectious Records' part, who wanted to boost their brand by licensing their artists to labels for particular markets. Prior to the US release of 1977, Trailer had sold 7,162 copies in that territory. "Jack Names the Planets" was released as a single there on August 15, 1995, to promote the soundtrack to the film Angus (1995). Trailer was released in the US on 12 September 1995. They re-recorded "Jack Names the Planets" again for their 2011 The Best of Ash compilation.

== Reception ==
Professional ratings
Review scores
Source	Rating
AllMusic	4/5 stars
Alternative Rock	6/10

Several critics complimented the songwriting. Heibutzki praised Wheeler's "relentlessly catchy confections" for "stand[ing] up to the Britpop vanguard's finest hours", and mentioned that the band "emphasizes stripped-down velocity over finesse." Fay added to this, saying that it served as a "measure of these three guys’ confidence and musical acumen that they manage to transform such workaday ingredients into such a tasty and inspired brew." He said that the album "proves conclusively that, by any standards, Ash are a rock band of genuine stature", regardless of the members' ages. Imran Ahmed of The Guardian said it offers a valuable snapshot of a growing songwriting talent." Consumable Online write Tim Mohr added to this, saying said it "yielded a catch of sloppy punk-pop songs, loud, fast, and fun ... certifying that the album was made by real teenagers and that certain songs were written in 5 minutes." Joachim Hiller of Ox-Fanzine noted that they were "a bit punky, a bit noisy, but they can't hide the fact that they're just another boring band from the island."

Other reviewers commented on it in the context of Ash's influences. Scott Hefflon of Lollipop Magazine wrote: "Starting with a pleasant pop/punk formula similar to the Buzzcocks and adding a flavoring of Dino Jr-esque guitar noise, Ireland’s Ash are a band on the move." CMJ New Music Report's Cherly Botchick wrote that despite the band's geographical origins, Trailer "couldn't be more steeped in delightfully familiar American rock traditions. She added that they created an album "packed with enough hooks and melodies to make" their US contemporaries "green with envy." Molanphy said "for all the (not unfounded) comparisons Ash has drawn to the Buzzcocks, its better numbers ... display a formidable talent for weaving hummable tunes and picaresque lyrics in the sonic assault." Fay felt that the references to other bands were a "little overly deferential" and said that the lyrics were "too often trite and predictable".

== Track listing ==
Writing credits per booklet.

1. "Season" (music and lyrics: Tim Wheeler) – 3:00
2. "Jack Names the Planets" (music and lyrics: Wheeler) – 3:10
3. "Intense Thing" (lyrics: Wheeler; music: Mark Hamilton, Rick McMurray, Wheeler) – 4:34
4. "Uncle Pat" – (music and lyrics: Wheeler) – 3:12
5. "Get Out" (lyrics: Hamilton; music: Wheeler) – 1:29
6. "Petrol" - (lyrics: Wheeler; music: Hamilton, Wheeler) – 4:24
7. "Obscure Thing" (Hamilton, McMurray, Wheeler) – 4:18

US and Japan bonus tracks

8. "Hulk Hogan Bubblebath" (Hamilton, McMurray, Wheeler) – 5:05
9. "Different Today" (Wheeler) – 2:50
10. "Punk Boy" (Helen Love cover) – 2:05
11. "Day of the Triffids" (Wheeler) – 3:33

Tracks 8–11 only appear on the US and Japan versions of the album. "Different Today" and "Hulk Hogan Bubblebath" appeared on the B-side of "Uncle Pat". "Day of the Triffids" originally appeared as a B-side of "Kung Fu" – (20 March 1995).

== Singles ==
- "Jack Names the Planets" was released in February, 1994 with "Don't Know".
- "Petrol" was released 15 August 1994 with "The Little Pond" and "Things".
- "Uncle Pat" was released 17 October 1994 with "Different Today" and "Hulk Hogan Bubblebath".

== Personnel ==
Personnel per booklet.

Ash

- Mark Hamilton – bass
- Tim Wheeler – guitar, vocals
- Rick McMurray – drums

Production and artwork

- "Oscar Wilde" – dialogue
- "Patrick the Brewer" – dialogue
- Ade Britteon – sleeve art
- Ash – sleeve art
- Smike – photography
- Mark Waterman – producer
- Tim Russell – mixing (tracks 1 and 3–5)
