= Summer Camp Nightmare =

- Directed by: Bert L. Dragin
- Written by: William Butler (novel); Bert L. Dragin; Penelope Spheeris
- Produced by: Robert Crow
- Starring: Chuck Connors; Charlie Stratton; Harold P. Pruett
- Cinematography: Don Burgess
- Edited by: Michael Spence
- Music by: Gary Chase; Ted Neeley
- Distributed by: Concorde Pictures
- Release date: April 17, 1987
- Running time: 90 minutes
- Country: United States
- Language: English

Summer Camp Nightmare is a 1987 American thriller film directed by Bert L. Dragin and starring Chuck Connors and Charlie Stratton. The film is based on the novel The Butterfly Revolution by William Butler.

== Plot ==
Donald Poultry is an intelligent, but somewhat socially stunted middle school boy attending Camp North Pines for the summer along with other middle and high school kids. He keeps a diary on his tape recorder, voicing his concerns. On the first night at dinner, counselor Ed Heinz introduces the campers to Mr. Warren, the camp's new director. Mr. Warren warns the campers to stay away from a dangerous rope bridge that leads to South Pines, the girls' side of the camp. He takes some of the younger children to collect butterflies. Counselor-in-training Franklin Reilly discovers Mr. Warren acted inappropriately with another boy during the hunt. During the camp's evening swim, CIT Chris Wade teaches Donald how to swim. Chris gets distracted by a visiting female doctor, and Donald nearly drowns. Franklin jumps in to rescue Donald. When counselor Jack Caldwell asks Franklin what happened, Franklin responds that he is just doing their job for them.

Mr. Warren strives to keep things "appropriate" for everyone, restricting the rec hall television to only receive broadcasts from a religious channel. He locks down the rec hall after Donald and Chris climb up on the roof to fix the rigging on the satellite dish and unlock the disabled channels. The next night, the girls from South Pines visit a co-ed talent show at North Pines. Mr. Warren further angers the boys by ending the event early after an inappropriate song by counselors-in-training Stanley Runk, nicknamed "Runk the Punk", and John Mason. As punishment, Mr. Warren also cancels the upcoming co-ed dance. Chris is also sent to the "meditation center" as punishment for making out with one of the girls after the show. Later that night, the CITs and some of the campers have a meeting. Franklin proposes they stage a coup and take control of the camp themselves. When some of the boys appear apprehensive, Franklin assures them it will be like a game. He appoints Donald as captain in the upcoming revolution.

The next morning, Franklin gets up early and steals a gun the counselors keep locked away for protection. The day begins as an event called Camper-Counselor Turnabout, where the campers and counselors trade places. At breakfast, camper Shawn poses as Mr. Warren and lists several changes to the rules in jest. When Franklin suggests Chris be freed from the meditation center, most of the mess hall joins him in support, startling the counselors. Franklin and his group are pursued by the counselors, who chase them to the meditation center. When Mr. Warren tries to lock Franklin in the building, Franklin takes control by revealing the gun he stole. The other boys help Franklin get the counselors into the meditation center, which is renamed the "pen". After Chris is released, Franklin states that the "game" will only last for twenty-four hours. Franklin and Runk visit South Pines to capture the female counselors and take over the camp, while the rest of the group take over North Pines' main office and disable the phone lines. Donald helps Franklin wire the office's intercom into South Pines, and Franklin announces to the girls what has happened. At the North Pines rec hall, Franklin appoints some of the boys and girls to ranks and positions, giving them control over certain aspects of the new combined camp. He leads everyone in an oath to the revolution, where the campers all swear not to betray the leaders.

That night, a party breaks out in the rec hall. Chris and his new girlfriend, Heather Long, become shocked at how out of control things are. John and Runk bring Mr. Warren to the party. Chris attempts to free Mr. Warren, who is tied up, but is prevented from doing so by the other boys. Runk takes Mr. Warren back to the pen. On the way, Mr. Warren attacks Runk with his hands still tied. Runk pulls out a knife and threatens Mr. Warren, but he charges Runk and runs right into the knife. Shocked, Runk runs back to the main office and tells Franklin about Mr. Warren's death. Franklin orders Runk to take Mr. Warren out to the caves far behind the camp and leave him in there. He warns Runk to keep the incident a secret.

The next morning, Franklin announces that the revolution will continue. He promotes Donald to Minister of Propaganda and appoints him to the Supreme Revolutionary Committee. Franklin names Chris and Heather as traitors, and turns the camp against them. The next morning, Chris and Heather run off after realizing the situation. Another camper, Laurie, asks Donald out to the co-ed dance, which has been rescheduled for that night. John leaves the dance to go for a walk with his girlfriend Debbie, who attempts to leave him after he grabs her. John sexually assaults Debbie, drawing the attention of Donald and Laurie, who are also out walking, and they run to help Debbie. Donald and Laurie report John to Franklin, who holds a meeting the next morning with the members of the Supreme Revolutionary Committee, as well as John and Debbie's friend groups. Later, Franklin decides to force John to traverse the rope bridge in a "trial by ordeal" arrangement. When John successfully loops the whole bridge, the girls become angry at him. After waiting for the other boys to leave, the girls carry John off and hang him from a tree.

Donald finds John's body and becomes very upset, deciding things have gone far enough. He jerry-rigs the disabled phone lines into the satellite over the main office, using a stolen receiver as a radio. While attempting to make contact, Donald is captured by Officer Blackridge and locked inside the office. Chris visits Donald and sympathizes with his thoughts on the camp, but Blackridge throws him out. The next morning, the camp discovers that Donald will be forced to loop the bridge as well. While Donald is crossing the bridge, Franklin orders Runk to cut one of the bridge's ropes. The campers realize Franklin wants Donald dead, and fight back against the Supreme Revolutionary Committee. The sheriff's department arrives and breaks up the fight, revealing they received Donald's broadcast the previous night. They take Donald's tape recorded diary for evidence, and Donald and Chris are dismissed as unwilling participants. Franklin and Runk are taken into custody by the deputies. Heather and Laurie wait together by the bus for home, and are both relieved to see Chris and Donald arrive. They all board the bus, leaving behind the deserted camp.

== Cast ==
- Chuck Connors as Mr. Warren
- Samantha Newark as Debbie
- Charlie Stratton as Franklin Reilly
- Harold Pruett as Chris Wade
- Adam Carl as Donald Poultry
- Tom Fridley as John Mason
- Melissa Brennan as Heather
- Stuart Rogers as Stanley Runk
- Shirley Mitchell as Mrs. Knute

== Release ==
Summer Camp Nightmare was given a limited release theatrically in the United States by Concorde Pictures through April and May 1987.

The film was released on VHS and LaserDisc the same year by Embassy Home Entertainment. As of 2021, the film has still not been officially released on DVD.
