= The Butterfly Revolution =

1961 novel by William Butler

- First edition
- Author: William Butler
- Genre: Novel
- Publisher: Peter Owen Publishers
- Publication date: 1961

The Butterfly Revolution is a novel by author William Butler, first published in 1961.

== Plot ==
Winston Weyn is sent to Camp High Pines as a gift for his birthday. Winston's father, who is concerned by his son's lack of interest in "normal" activities such as sports and playing outside, feels attending camp will be a healthy activity for his son. Because Winston initially believes he will not like the camp, he brings a few books and the diary his uncle gave him for his birthday. Upon arrival, Winston finds he enjoys the camp and is elected as leader of his cabin by the camp director Mr. Warren.

Several of the older boys, led by Frank Reilley and Stanley Runk, plot a revolutionary takeover of the camp. Winston and a couple of his friends join in the effort. The only older boy to voice dissent to the idea is Don Egriss, a thoughtful and introspective African-American boy who is one of the only minorities present at the camp.

Stanley Runk, armed with a large hunting knife takes Mr. Warren hostage while the other boys round up the rest of the staff and throw them into the camp's "jail". The boys proceed to Low Pines, the sister camp for girls nearby, and capture the adults there as well. Various teenage and preteen boys and girls are made "officers" and given charge over various aspects of the Revolution. A "Supreme Revolutionary Committee", or SRC, consisting of Frank Reilley and some of his more trusted cohorts, makes all important decisions. Winston, as "Chairman of the Propaganda Committee", soon becomes part of the SRC.

Winston becomes uneasy at the level of totalitarian control becoming evident in the camp's operations. When he voices these concerns, a boy named George Meridel denounces him as a Communist. At the same time, the revolution faces internal conflicts as Reilley and Runk get into a power struggle. Winston learns that Reilley has in his possession a gun that belonged to Mr. Warren. Winston gets into trouble with the SRC by refusing to recite the Pledge of Allegiance each morning. Don Egriss tries to escape the camp but is captured. Winston is placed under the control of his enemy, Bob Daly. When he hits Bob Daly with a wooden lance, he is jailed temporarily. Soon after his release Don Egriss and John Mason get into a fight. Mr. Warren's gun is thrown into the cell and Egriss, fearing for his life, shoots Mason in self-defense, killing him.

Meanwhile, the girls at Low Pines have been calling for John Mason's blood due to his having raped one of the campers. With Mason dead, the girls threaten violence and are given Don Egriss instead. They lynch Egriss and leave his body to rot in the woods, where Winston buries him.

The local sheriff's department invade High Pines and take several children into custody. The sheriff/deputies interrogate Winston about his activities on the SRC and ask if he really read Communist books and refused to say the Pledge, which he does not deny. Winston is released to his parents. It is revealed that Reilley and some of his cohorts killed Mr. Warren and hid his body in a cave. Winston, who feels he has lost his innocence, is comforted by his uncle.

== Film adaptation ==
The film called Summer Camp Nightmare from 1987, was inspired by the novel, but is not considered a full and faithful adaptation.
