= Samantha Newark =

British musician (born 1967)

- Born: 27 June 1967 (age 59); London, England
- Genres: Pop; rock; glam rock
- Occupations: Musician; singer; actress
- Instruments: Vocals; guitar
- Years active: 1985–present
- Website: samanthanewark.com

Samantha Newark (born 27 June 1967) is an English-born American musician and actress. She is best known for her voice-over work as the speaking voice of Jem and Jerrica in the animated cartoon series Jem. Her work on Jem produced a serious cult following that persists to this day. In 2015, Newark appeared in the live-action feature film adaptation on Jem and the Holograms directed by Jon M. Chu.

== Early years ==
Newark was born in Wimbledon, London. Although she was born in England, her family then moved to Rhodesia and later to the United States. She attended several different schools and began her music career in Africa after seeing Lena Zavaroni perform.

== Acting career ==
Newark is best known for her voice-over work on the animated 1980s cartoon series Jem as the speaking voice of Jerrica/Jem. "Jem" remains her most well known role and Newark receives invitations to meet the Jem fans at pop culture conventions all over the world. Newark made a cameo appearance in the Jem and the Holograms live action film adaptation.

Newark was nominated for a Young Artist Award twice for "Exceptional Young Actress in Animation, Series, Specials, or Film Features" and "Best Animated Series". Other voice-over credits include guest-starring on The Transformers as "Ariel" and "Elise Presser", and voicing a young Peter Pan's mother in the Steven Spielberg feature film Hook. She also played the role of Debbie in the 1987 thriller film Summer Camp Nightmare. In 2012 she was invited to contribute two characters to the Festival favorite animated short Pound Dogs, created by Mike Salva. This project won the MTV "Voice and Vision Animation Award" for writing and animation and garnered two development deals with MTV.

Newark also works in video games, providing voices for games including Twisted Metal: Black and Britney's Dance Beat, where she played the roles of the Choreographer and the Asian dancer.

== Music career ==
Newark began her professional music career at the age of seven. Signed to Nitty Gritty Records, she recorded her first record while living in Africa, then toured to support her single "Jimmy Jimbo" produced by Allan Goldswain and Mike Adams. At age 10, she immigrated to America and signed with International Creative Management, where she served as the opening act for Eddie Rabbitt, Pat Boone, Debby Boone and Mac Davis at the State Fair. She was cast in the title role in the United States Navy band production of the musical Annie in Washington D.C., and eventually moved with her family to Burbank, California where she played Rosie in a production of Sweet Charity and Dorothy in a Los Angeles production of The Wizard of Oz. She was a frequent performer of The L.A. Kids cabaret and performed often with the Ray Anthony orchestra at the famous Shrine Auditorium and on many telethons. She also was a featured guest vocalist at age 14 with the 65 piece Los Angeles Pops orchestra. She won the Los Angeles vocal competition at the age of 17 and then through the late 1990s started to write and record her own original music with many different incarnations of original bands.

Newark recorded the song "In Your Eyes" for the 1986 anime film Project A-ko and worked with Richie Zito and Joey Carbone and was hired to sing multiple songs on the soundtrack for the movie Crazy Six starring Rob Lowe, Burt Reynolds, Mario Van Peebles.

She was one of 20 finalists from 10,000 submissions for the Lilith Fair talent contest sponsored by Star 98.7 radio and Universal contests in 1999. Newark was also one of 15 budding songwriters accepted into the Lester Sill Ascap songwriting workshop where she met writer, producer, and long time collaborator composer Mike Reagan She and Reagan worked together through the late 1990s writing original music, performing live, and contributing vocals for various PlayStation games. She provided vocal accompaniment for the movie soundtrack Some Girl starring Juliette Lewis and the movie Material Girls.

While living in Los Angeles she worked as a session singer for writer, producer Michele Vice Maslin. She has worked in the EDM world co-writing a song called "Deeper" for the German group Fragma. The version with her vocals was remixed by EDM producer Nick Terranova. In late 2006, she auditioned for Julian Coryell to be a backup singer for Leonard Cohen. The project was set to do a world tour and after two months of rehearsals the tour was cancelled and put on hold for two years where it started up again with a new MD and new team.

Newark made her move to Nashville, Tennessee in October 2007. She released her self-titled debut album in 2008. Songs from the album have been featured in numerous television programs including Smallville, Reba, Life is Wild, and Gossip Girl, America's Next Top Model, as well as MTV's Laguna Beach, Punk'd, and My Super Sweet 16.

In 2008, Newark was invited to be a part of the documentary film "Saravia" written and directed by Joaquin Montalvan about the spiritual journey into the life of painter, writer and composer Mauricio Saravia. Newark and Saravia met in Los Angeles and worked closely together on the soundtrack for the film. Newark composed the melodies for Saravia's poetry that was featured throughout the film and she performed one of the songs live in the movie.

Newark released her second album Somethin' Good in late October 2011, with songs written and performed by Newark and produced by Dave Polich, Michael Jackson's keyboard programmer on the This Is It concerts. Her third album, Hologram, described as a "love letter" to her many fans, was scheduled for release in November 2016 and final debut in 2017. A dance music version of this album, Hologram 2.0, was released in late 2021 and included remixes by musical artists Hyperbubble and Jipsta.

== Filmography ==
=== Film ===
Year	Title	Role	Notes
1987	Summer Camp Nightmare	Debbie	
2015	Jem and the Holograms	Hair Stylist	

=== Television ===
Year	Title	Role	Notes
1985–1988	Jem	Jerrica Benton / Jem (voice)	65 episodes
1985–1986	The Transformers	Ariel, Elise Presser (voices)	2 episodes
2016	HG Chicken and the Chronological	Magus Pink	Television short

=== Video games ===
Year	Title	Role	Notes
2001	Twisted Metal: Black		Uncredited
2002	Britney's Dance Beat		
2002	Wild Arms 3	Vocalist - "Advanced Wind", "Only the Night Sky Knows", "Wings"	
2003	James Bond 007: Everything or Nothing		
2005	God of War	Score vocals	
