= Hyperbubble =

American pop duo

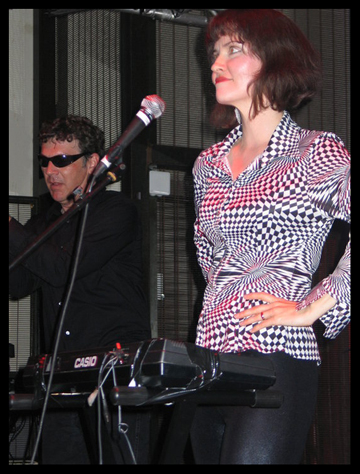
- Hyperbubble performance in Toulouse, France (2010): left to right, Jeff DeCuir, Jess DeCuir

Background information
- Origin: San Antonio, Texas, U.S.
- Genres: Synth-pop; electropop
- Years active: 1997–present
- Labels: Bubblegum; Filthy Little Angels; Uncle Buzz; Fellowshipwreck; Socket Sounds; Pure Pop for Now People
- Members: Jess DeCuir; Jeff DeCuir
- Website: hyperbubble.net

Hyperbubble is an international visual and performing arts electropop/synth-pop duo from San Antonio, Texas, formed by Jeff DeCuir and Jess Barnett DeCuir. The music of this American group is variously described as "early Eurythmics meets Josie and the Pussycats," referencing "markers such as New Musik, the Normal and Thomas Dolby." Their songs are "catchy synth pop that mixes kitsch, retrofuturism and pop art in a chrome blender and sets the contents jiggling to a hypnotic robo-rhythm" with "lyrics that offer quirky takes on SF tropes from cyborgs and clones to ray guns and erotic surveillance."

== History ==
=== Spleen, Pink Filth and Crevice ===
Jeff DeCuir starred separately in numerous bands leading up to Hyperbubble. An example is Spleen, a Jem and the Holograms tribute band, Jeff co-founded in 1989 and in which he played drums under the name Stormer.

Jeff first performed together with Jess Barnett DeCuir in the experimental dark ambient group Crevice and later, the "bouncy AM retro-pop" Pink Filth, both recording primarily with Uncle Buzz Records. In the latter band, the duo played under the stage names, Nick Velvet and Baby Jessica, working lead vocals and keyboards. The two married in 2000.

Both bands mixed art with music, foreshadowing the pair's efforts with Hyperbubble. Crevice collaborated with American visual artist and composer Christian Marclay on the premier of Marclay's now-annual touring exhibit, The Sounds of Christmas, in 1999. Pink Filth created music that was part of an installation by Jess as well as producing the CDs included with the comic books Warrior Nun Areala Special Edition No. 3 and Shotgun Mary CD Edition No. 1 by Antarctic Press.

=== Hyperbubble ===
The band started as a creation of Jeff. Hyperbubble first appeared as the attributed author of a track on the 1997 album Acid Ranch 2000. Several years later, Jess joined him after the dissolution of Pink Filth to re-launch the concept band. In 2004, Hyperbubble debuted their first album, Sol!d Pop. Described as "peppy synth pop par excellence," the album showcased their ability to apply "the breakneck pace of punk… to straight-up synthpop."

Their music contained a wry sci-fi element, the duo labeling it "bionic bubblepunk." Hyperbubble was described as a band "in the proud tradition... of musicians pretending to be robots," but "taking the android artifice to intentionally over-the-top extremes, then undercutting all the sci-fi hokum with flashes of genuine humanity." Sol!d Pop also displayed their persistent use of sampling; the band's most popular downloaded song, "Leon", even featured sounds from their cat. With their penchant for mixing, a remix version of the album soon followed. This tradition continued for future albums as well.

Hyperbubble realized regional success with a showcase band slot at the South by Southwest Music Festival and their 2007 album, Airbrushed Alibis, named a best local album. The band was later voted Best Electronica Band in 2008 and runner-up Best Electronic Band in 2009 and Best Electronic Act in 2010 in the San Antonio Current. They gained international recognition with recordings released by UK label Filthy Little Angels, which included Airbrushed Alibis. The "retro-techno-bubblegum pop" album continued their "cartoonish, Hanna-Barbera view of the future, informed by 1960s visions of the 21st century as an era of flying cars and robotic romance." A 2008 dub version of the album heavily remixed and slowed down the pace of the original tracks.

Huw Stephens featured the Hyperbubble song "Supermarket Casanova" on his nationally syndicated BBC Radio 1 program in 2007. Their tour of the UK the next year led to them being signed by Glasgow-based Bubblegum Records. Their first EP with the label, Better Set Your Phasers to Stun, featured a collaboration with Welsh bubblegum pop punk rocker Helen Love in which they covered her song from the title, with an added vocal track provided by her from her 1995 tune, "We Love You". The release completed their transition to a truly international group. Later in 2018, Love promoted the band in their music video for "Double Denim".

Their next full-length CD, Candy Apple Daydreams, was described as a "cartoon automaton symphony" and a "pop opera… utilizing an amazing overture theme that weaves in and out of the entire album." The music "sounds something like Madonna would sound...if her music were geared more towards school kids." The effort hit several best-of lists, including popular Scot Spotify blogger the Pansentient League's top five synthpop albums, Electro and Pop's Top Albums of 2010 (France) and Favorite Albums Of 2010 by the Houston Press, which also dubbed it "the best electronic album to come out of Texas since Asmodeus X's Morningstar. The title track further made the English Electricity Club's top 30 songs of the year.

Releases in 2011 included their LP, Drastic Cinematic with the German label, Pure Pop For Now People. Characterized as a soundtrack to an imaginary Jean-Luc Godard film, the album possesses a darker and more atmospheric mood than their previous efforts. Manda Rin of the Scottish band Bis contributed guest vocals along with sampled sounds from her cat, Akiko. An extended CD/MP3 version from Bubblegum notably adds a remix of their song "Welcome to Infinity" by Mark Towns, who previously worked on Hits! The Very Best of Erasure. The collaboration with Manda Rin continued in a 2013 release, Hyperbubble + Manda Rin.

=== 2015–present ===
In 2015, the band released its first live album, Live in London, drawn from a performance a year earlier at The Lexington in London, England. The concert was part of a larger bill featuring Helen Love. The release primarily featured live versions of songs from their first three albums.

On their 2017 album Western Ware, they teamed with Scott Simon of Our Daughter's Wedding to record the missing title track of their 1981 Digital Cowboy EP. They also collaborated with Rikki & Daz on their cover of the duo's "Rhinestone Cowboy".

In 2018, Electronic Sound Magazine bundled with their print issue a compilation CD Man & Machine commemorating Kraftwerk that included Hyperbubble's "Bionic Girl" from their Sol!d Pop album alongside tracks by Devo, Ultravox's John Foxx, Throbbing Gristle's Chris Carter and Meat Beat Manifesto.

Co-founder of the NY Theremin Society Dorit Chrysler included Hyperbubble's "(I'm Your) Satellite" in the Society's 2020 album marking the centenary of the theremin. The song appeared in both 12-track vinyl and 21-track CD versions of the compilation "THEREMIN100", along with pieces by noted thereminists Chrysler, Carolina Eyck, The Radio Science Orchestra and Lydia Kavina. They also collaborated with Jem and the Holograms lead voiceover artist Samantha Newark on a remix of her "Hologram" for her 2021 album Hologram 2.0.

On February 19, 2023, a documentary movie about the group, Cowgirls and Synthesizers, was released on the festival circuit in the Fellowshipwreck Film Fest. The film soundtrack was released the next year.

Socket Sounds and Kaniption Records released a remastered collection of the group’s music entitled, The Singles, on June 20, 2025.

=== Hyperbubble as visual art ===
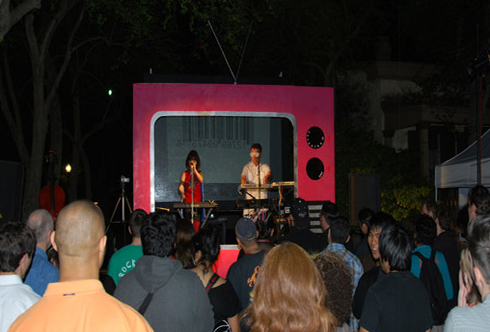
Hyperbubble performs in costume and in a giant TV at the 2010 Luminaria Festival in San Antonio, Texas

An intrinsic component of Hyperbubble is the integration of pop culture and the performing and visual arts into its performances, music videos and packaging. This is informed by the duo's art background. Jess received a Master of Fine Arts from the University of Texas at San Antonio and is an art department faculty member at San Antonio College and the Southwest School of Art. Jeff who has a B.F.A. from the University of Texas San Antonio served as an instructor at the International Academy of Design and Technology San Antonio prior to his current stint at the Southwest School of Art. He also designs show flyer and CD and album cover art. In keeping with their art background, the band debuted at the Cactus Bra Space in San Antonio's Blue Star Arts Complex on November 6, 2003 and continues to perform in art spaces. In 2007, the band played in support of an exhibit opening by new wave musician/artist of Devo, Mark Mothersbaugh, entitled "Postcard Diaries."

The duo views the band as "a complete audio-visual package." The San Antonio Luminaria Festival invited Hyperbubble to perform as a multidisciplinary and visual artist. One year, they played at the festival inside a giant pink TV set dressed as superheroes. The San Antonio Current observed that the Hyperbubble aesthetic on stage and through their website "is defined by clean lines, lots of open space, primary colors, and a judicious under-use of words." A local online magazine summed up the group as "more than just a band, Hyperbubble is a collection of symbols, including text, graphic art, audio, video, live performance, and photography."

Hyperbubble has integrated their music into art and multimedia installations by Jess and collaborated on a 2009 sound art project by regional artists Jen Khoshbin and Paul Lewis. The band itself has produced stand-alone visual art to accompany their music such as for the Sleeveface photo exhibit and Covers and Sleevefaces release at Lieu Commun in Toulouse, France. In 2016, they performed at the San Antonio Museum of Art in conjunction with their release of Music to Color By and a companion coloring book, Coloring Book Concert, illustrated by the duo.

=== Side projects ===
Hyperbubble contributed music for Gracie DuVin, drum programming for The Gilliam Section's song "Solus" on their 2009 eponymous album (WMT/Habitual Grace Recordings) and backing vocals for Femme Fatality's 2008 One's Not Enough on Stickfigure Records. They also provided vocals for "The Very Nerve Centre Of Art/Video Cliche" on Spray's 2016 Enforced Fun.

Hyperbubble also produced music for commercials, a podcast and films, including a stop-motion film. In 2006, they supplied theme and incidental music for San Antonio-based Modsnap, a public-access television cable TV show on fashion. They won Best Musical Score for Dee Dee Rocks the Galaxy at the 2014 San Antonio 48 Hour Film Project.

Both members occasionally recorded for the electronic group Moonrox. Jeff also supplied the theme song for the webseries Nightlife the Series under the name "Macchio Man." Jessica performed theremin for Wolverton's 2017 album Wizard Land.

== Members ==
- Jess DeCuir – Lead vocals, Keyboards, Electronic Drum Pads, Theremin (2003-)
- Jeff DeCuir – Backing vocals, Sequencer, Synthesizers, Vocoder (1997-)

== Discography ==
=== Studio albums ===
- Sol!d Pop, 2004 – Uncle Buzz Records (Socket Sounds)
- Airbrushed Alibis, 2007 – Filthy Little Angels (UK)
- Candy Apple Daydreams, 2010 – Bubblegum Records (UK)
- Drastic Cinematic, 2011 – Pure Pop For Now People (Germany)
- Music to Color By, 2016 – Pure Pop For Now People
- Western Ware, 2017 – Fellowshipwreck

=== Soundtracks ===
- Attack of the Titans, 2014 – Pure Pop For Now People
- Dee Dee Rocks the Galaxy, 2015 – Pure Pop For Now People
- Cowgirls and Synthesizers, 2024 – ArtLabTX Films (US)

== Remixes of Hyperbubble ==
- "Passing Phase (Remix)", Wytebred, 2005
- "Passing Phase (Crazy DJ Mix)", Skyliber, 2005
- "Passing Phase (Remix)", DJ 486, 2005
- "Psychic Connection (Remix)", Psychomantis, 2005
- "Psychic Connection (Remix)", Love in the Space Age, 2005
- "Nervous System (Because of My Dog Mix)", Stolearm, 2007
- "Hyperactive (Stolearm's Nightmare Mix)", Track No. 3 and "Supermarket Casanova (Stolearm's Nightmare Mix)", Track No. 9, Remixes + collaborations, Stolearm, 2010
