= 1977 (Ash album) =

Studio album by Ash
- Released: 6 May 1996
- Recorded: Christmas 1994; Easter 1995; January–March 1996
- Studio: Loco, Usk Valley, Wales; Rockfield, Rockfield, Wales
- Genre: Britpop; power pop; garage rock; pop rock; pop-punk
- Length: 61:52
- Label: Infectious, Home Grown
- Producer: Owen Morris; Ash

Ash chronology
Trailer (1994)	1977 (1996)	Nu-Clear Sounds (1998)

Singles from 1977
- 1. "Kung Fu" Released: 20 March 1995; 2. "Girl from Mars" Released: 31 July 1995; 3. "Angel Interceptor" Released: 9 October 1995; 4. "Goldfinger" Released: 15 April 1996; 5. "Oh Yeah" Released: 24 June 1996

1977 is the debut studio album by Northern Irish rock band Ash. It was released on 6 May 1996 by Home Grown and Infectious Records, with whom the band had signed following the release of several demo tapes. Ash released the mini-album Trailer in 1994, and followed it with three singles "Kung Fu", "Girl from Mars", and "Angel Interceptor", all of which would reappear on 1977. Ash recorded their debut album with producer Owen Morris at Rockfield Studios in Wales in early 1996. Described as a Britpop, power pop and garage rock album, 1977 drew comparisons to the Buzzcocks, Dinosaur Jr., and Sonic Youth.

Preceded by the album's fourth single "Goldfinger" in April 1996, the band embarked on tours of the United Kingdom and Europe. "Oh Yeah" was released as the fifth single in June 1996, followed by tours of the United States, Japan, Australia, and New Zealand. Ash ended the year with another US tour, as well as a US support slot for Weezer. They toured Europe and the UK, before their appearance at Glastonbury Festival.

1977 received generally positive reviews from music critics, who praised the album's "catchy" nature. The album peaked at number one in the UK, as well as reaching the top 40 in Australia, Finland, New Zealand, Norway, and Switzerland. "Kung Fu", "Girl from Mars", "Angel Interceptor", "Goldfinger", and "Oh Yeah" all charted on the UK Singles Chart, with "Goldfinger" reaching the highest position at number five. 1977 appeared on several UK publications' best-of-the-year album lists, by the likes of Kerrang!, NME, and Melody Maker, among others. The album would later be certified platinum in the UK.

== Background ==
In December 1989, schoolfriends Tim Wheeler and Mark Hamilton received instruments for Christmas, and decided to form a metal act they called Vietnam. The rest of the line-up consisted of vocalist Gareth Hutchinson, guitarist Malcolm King, and drummer Andy McLean, who would all leave by early 1992 citing a lack of interest in the band. After seeing a show by a local act, Lazer Gun Nun, Wheeler and Hamilton decided to move their sound away from metal and into Nirvana-leaning territory. Around this time, Wheeler was discovering the likes of ABBA and Paul McCartney and Wings. Vietnam ultimately disbanded, and Wheeler and Hamilton decided to form a punk band. Wheeler handled vocals and guitar, Hamilton the bass. They spent two weeks amassing original material in Wheeler's bedroom. Drummer Rick McMurray joined the pair in June 1992; Wheeler had approached him during a school play, and invited him to his house for a jam session.

With the line-up finalised, they christened themselves Ash after spotting the word in a dictionary. Over the course of a year, the band recorded four demos tapes: Solar Happy in June 1992, Shed in September, Home Demo in November, and Garage Girl in February 1993. A friend of the band had sent one of the demos to Paddy Davis of the public relations company, Bad Moon. He played it for four months, before passing it to Steve Tavener, who had plans to start a record label. Tavener and Davis subsequently went to Belfast to watch the band perform. Ash released their debut single, "Jack Names the Planets", through Tavener's La La Land Records in February 1994, by which point he had become their manager.

In April 1994, the band travelled to London to promote it. Several major labels approached them, before they signed with Infectious Records with an advance of £12,000 and a 50–50 share of the profits with the label. Ash set up the imprint Home Grown as part of Infectious with which they would put out their future releases. As Hamilton and Wheeler were 17 years old, their parents had to sign the contract on their behalf, as well as permission from their school headmaster Jack Ferris. Two more singles, "Petrol" and "Uncle Pat", preceded the release of the band's mini-album Trailer in October 1994. During this period, two-thirds of the band were focusing on their A-Levels, touring with Babes in Toyland and Elastica during their half-term holidays. In February 1995, Wheeler and McMurray flew to the United States to meet with potential labels, including Reprise and Interscope Records. They signed to the former, who was experiencing success with the stylistically similar Green Day.

== Recording and production ==
In preparation for their debut album, the band met with a few producers, such as Phil Vinall, who had produced the Auteurs, while Wheeler wanted Marc Waterman to produce it, having known him for his work on Nowhere (1990) by Ride. Producer Owen Morris was working on A Northern Soul (1995) with the Verve at the end of 1994; Ash's manager and Infectious founder Korda Marshall suggested they record a few songs with him. Wheeler said they wanted a "cool, young" producer and selected him upon learning that Morris was influenced by acts they liked, such as David Bowie, T. Rex and Thin Lizzy. The band opted to record one song with him to see how their working relationship would unfold. They recorded "Kung Fu" and an unfinished version of "Angel Interceptor" over Christmas 1994 at Loco Studios in Usk Valley, Wales. "Girl from Mars" was recorded in Easter 1995 at Rockfield Studios in Rockfield, Monmouthshire, Wales.

Ash had to record some B-sides with Phil Thornalley in London, but as they were not working effectively, Thornalley walked out and Morris, who happened to be in the city, was drafted in; they then finished working on "Angel Interceptor". The band worked on pre-production with Morris in December 1995, with him visiting the band at their rehearsal space, running through all of the song ideas they had. After playing him everything they thought was worthwhile, including portions of "Lose Control" and "Oh Yeah", he inquired if they had anything else, they showed him "Goldfinger". Wheeler considered it a B-side, until Morris exclaimed, "you idiot, that's a single!". The band and Morris began recording their debut album on New Year's Day 1996, commencing with "Goldfinger". The rest of the material that would appear on the album was recorded at Rockfield Studios at a cost of £800 per day, with Morris and the band co-producing the album.

Though the process was planned to take only six weeks, it ended up lasting three months. Because they had toured incessantly since leaving school, the band did not have enough time to accumulate material for an album. Wheeler wrote nearly half of what would end up on the finished album in the studio. As Rockfield was a residential studio, according to Wheeler, the members became "very nocturnal and very crazy". He attributed this to Morris "gradually introducing us to drugs, so we were off our heads a lot of the time". Nick Brine, Sorrel Merchant and Neil Kiely acted as studio assistants. Morris later mixed the recordings at Orinoco in London, except for "Girl from Mars" (Thornalley) and "Angel Interceptor" (Mark "Spike" Stent). Thornalley mixed "Girl on Mars" as the band's label and manager felt the track was incomplete, much to the annoyance of Morris.

== Composition and lyrics ==
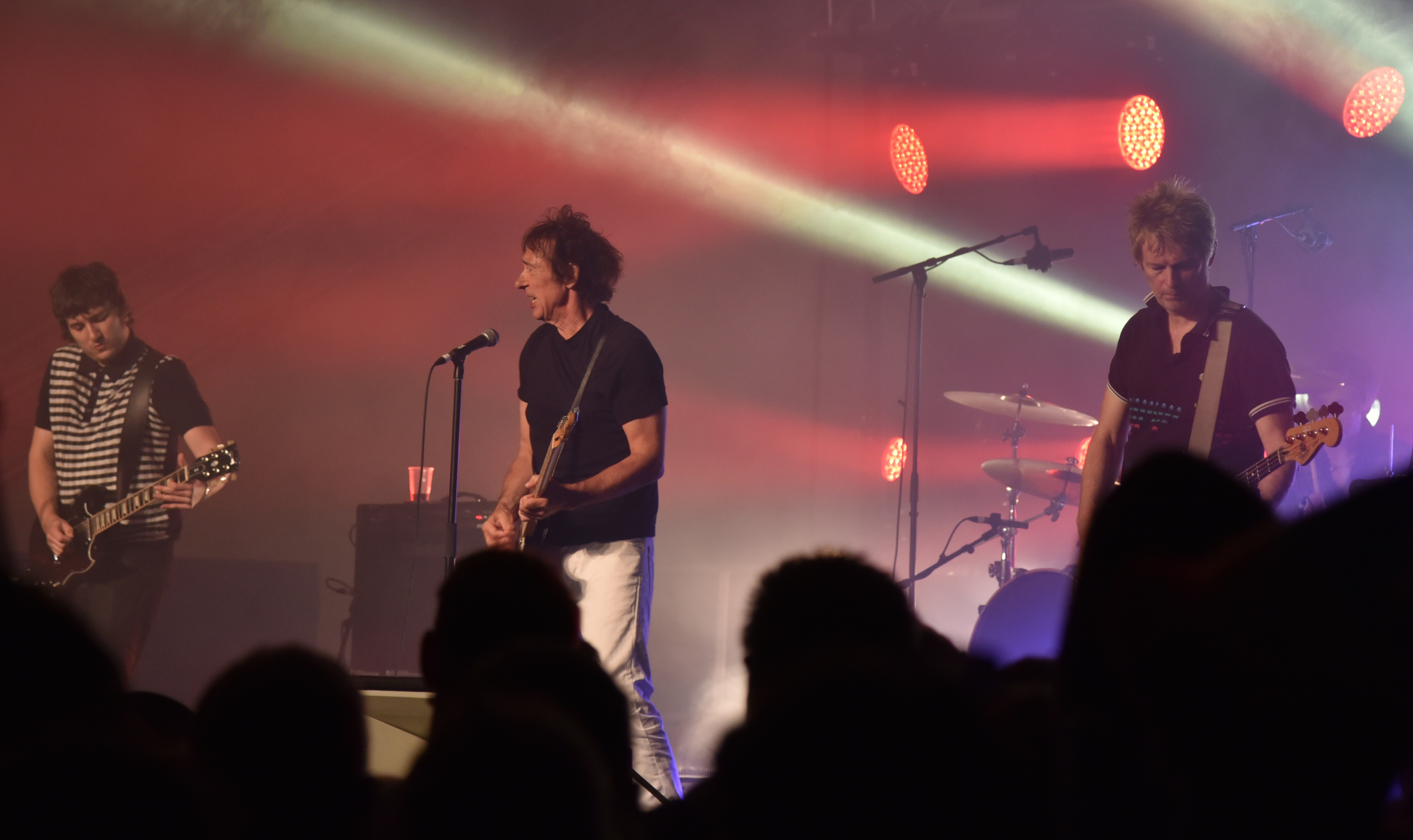
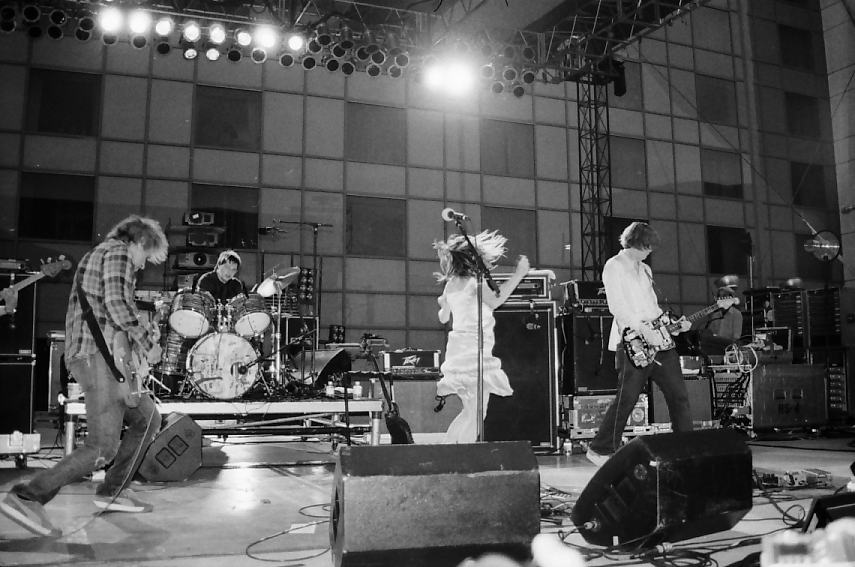
The sound of 1977 has drawn comparisons to the work of Buzzcocks (top) and Sonic Youth (bottom).

=== Music and themes ===
Musically, the sound of 1977 has been described as Britpop, power pop, garage rock, pop-punk, and pop rock, with elements of glam rock and grunge, drawing comparisons to the work of Buzzcocks and Sonic Youth, as well as the albums Bug (1988) by Dinosaur Jr., and Bandwagonesque (1991) by Teenage Fanclub. In a 2020 interview, Wheeler thought that the Britpop tag "felt a bit weird", as he explained that they were influenced more by American music than British music. He attributed the range of styles to the band's American label, Reprise Records, having sent him several CDs from their back catalogue. They had spent two months coming up with random titles: Ash – The Album, Child Abuse, A Tribute to Apache Indian, Owen's Angels, Tim, Mark and the Other and Corporate Record Company Bullshit Wank. When Morris eventually asked what it was going to be called, the band replied 1977.

1977 refers to the release year of Star Wars (1977) and the year Wheeler and Hamilton were born. Though some commenters said it alluded to the year punk rock and Sex Pistols achieved mainstream popularity, author Charlie Porter in his biography on the band Ash: 77–97 (1997) dismissed this. He said the genre's "vigour was extinguished by bitterness and internal cat-fights", de-evolving into a brand, "[s]o punk is not the reason this CD [...] is called 1977". He considered the name as "rather a blank name, a title that sounds sassy, but which means nothing. It leaves the music to be judge on its own merit".

Wheeler is credited with writing all of the album's tracks, except for "Lose Control" (which he co-wrote with Hamilton), "Innocent Smile" (written by Hamilton) and "Angel Interceptor" (co-written with McMurray). Wheeler estimated that Hamilton had written half of "Lose Control", while McMurray had helped him with the lyrics to "Angel Interceptor". When working on material, Wheeler wrote the music first, taking inspiration from other peoples' songs he heard.

Nick Ingman, Morris and Wheeler came up with string arrangements, which were done with a 30-piece orchestra; Ingman had worked on "History" (1995) from A Northern Soul and "Unfinished Sympathy" (1991) by Massive Attack. Wheeler referred to some of his lyrics as "a little too sickly sweet", explaining that he took inspiration from the work of the Beach Boys and Phil Spector-produced tracks. The album features a sample of a TIE fighter from Star Wars; Wheeler was unsure if the band got permission for it, but theorised the label was fine with it as they were owned by 20th Century Fox which had made Star Wars. A science fiction theme can be heard throughout the album, which Wheeler attributed to his sister having a David Bowie poster with the phrase "Life on Mars" written across it, coupled with Trompe le Monde (1991) by Pixies.

=== Songs ===
The opening track "Lose Control" is a punk rock song that utilises a quiet-and-loud dynamic, recalling the work of Therapy? with its guitar solo. Wheeler's guitar riff consists of tremolo-enhanced octave picking in an ascending order, while the solo is affected by a wah-wah pedal and includes multiple bends. The song's protagonist pleads for a girl to cheat on her boyfriend. "Goldfinger" channels the sound of Teenage Fanclub. When they began writing it, the band borrowed an instrumental break section from what they believed was "Goldfinger" (1964) sung by Shirley Bassey, but turned out to be a song by John Barrie. Subsequent sections of the song were written around the world while touring to support Trailer. Wheeler said they kept the name "Goldfinger" as "it has a lot of mystery", while the lyrics detail a man wanting to buy drugs.

The opening ten bars of "Girl from Mars" are played acoustically, before erupting into a wall of guitars, reminiscent of Dinosaur Jr. member J Mascis. A family holiday in France, where Wheeler smoked and drank with some people on a beach, influenced the track's chorus section. The song was written around the time of Trailer but not included on it as their manager and label thought it would not be good for the band to have a hit single while still attending school. "I'd Give You Anything" is a harder, Stooges-esque track, which cribs from "N.I.B." (1970) by Black Sabbath. Author Dave Thompson wrote in his book Alternative Rock (2000) that this was a throwback to Hamilton and Wheeler's time as Vietnam. It was the last track Wheeler had written while living at his parents' home. Initially uptempo, Morris suggested the band slow it down. Porter said the confident vocals and breezy guitarwork earned it a comparison to the sound of Oasis.

Ash made two versions of "Gone the Dream": The final version ended up as an indie rock song that featured a string section and reminiscent of the Boo Radleys, while the other version was a Beatles-esque track made at Morris' insistence. "Kung Fu" is a tribute to Jackie Chan in the vein of the Ramones. Wheeler wrote it at home in three minutes before leaving to record with Morris in late 1994. Wheeler claimed that he binge-listened to the Ramones over the Christmas period, while discovering the words "kung fu", "Hong Kong", and "fu manchu", and watching a series of movies featuring Chan.

"Oh Yeah" is a nostalgic track about teenage romance, and features extra vocals by Lisa Moorish. Wheeler wrote it when he was 18 about his first romance at 15, when he experienced those emotions for the first time. "Let It Flow" was written in the studio, and originally featured an intro before the chorus section, which was later dropped. The song's original lyrics were scrapped, and re-written by Wheeler while the rest of the band were at a pub. Wheeler attributed its sound to the work of Teenage Fanclub and the Lemonheads. The lyrics describe how love can affect a person to the point they are unable to see their partner's influence over them.

Kayley Kravitz of Vanyaland said "Innocent Smile" was the "bratty younger sibling" of "Goldfinger" as "an atmospheric, lo-fi epic (by Ash standards) about criminal teenage kicks". it is indebted to Daydream Nation (1988)-era Sonic Youth with its slow build-up. "Angel Interceptor" is a mix of punk rock and doo-wop. Wheeler said he was "notoriously bad at finishing lyrics", which prompted Morris to tell him and McMurray to leave the studio to finish writing it. It discusses sex and sees Wheeler pondering as to when he will see his girlfriend again, despite seeing her a day prior. The title is an alludes to the jet girl characters from the Captain Scarlet and the Mysterons TV series, while the chorus references astronaut Yuri Gagarin and the Apollo space missions. Wheeler considered it a pseudo-sequel to "Girl from Mars". At the end of the recording, McMurray can be heard yelling "Whooo! Yeah, we've got it!", while he was on his first ecstasy trip.

"Lost in You" was by influenced by the Beach Boys, and written at the end of the recording process. Wheeler explained the band was stressed from pushing themselves, which he said came across in the song's performance. He wrote "Darkside Lightside" from the perspective of someone who had sex with another person's girlfriend; it opened with Iron Maiden-like riffs, and ended with guitar work reminiscent of Pink Floyd. 11 1/2 minutes after "Darkside Lightside" ends the hidden track "Sick Party" plays, consisting of Hamilton and guitar tech Leif Bodnarchuk vomiting. It was planned initially to be part of the outtake "The Scream", which according to Wheeler was "built up [from] 48 tracks that started out like a murmur up to full on screaming". When it came time to mix the song, they were "too scared". Because the band felt "Sick Party" "turned out to be so funny", it became a standalone track.

== Release ==
"Kung Fu" was released as the lead single from 1977 on 20 March 1995, with "Day of the Triffids" and "Luther Ingo's Star Cruiser" as the B-sides. While Wheeler was studying the last six months of his A-Levels, he would be interrupted by having to do multiple interviews. "Girl from Mars" was released as the album's second single on 31 July 1995, with "Astral Conversations with Toulouse Lautrec" and a cover of "Cantina Band" by John Williams as the B-sides. The music video for "Girl from Mars", which was directed Peter Christopherson of Throbbing Gristle, was shot on the beach at Camber Sands following the band's debut tour in mainland Europe. The band promoted the song with an appearance on Top of the Pops. Around this, the band had finished school, which then allowed them to tour more and do promotional events, gigging until the end of the year. "Angel Interceptor" followed as the third single on 9 October 1995, with "5 a.m. Eternal" and a cover of "Gimme Some Truth" (1971) by John Lennon as the B-sides. The following month, the band went on a short US tour with China Drum. Coinciding with this, "Kung Fu" was released as a single to modern rock radio stations in the US.

"Goldfinger" was released as the fourth single from 1977 on 15 April 1996, with "I Need Somebody", "Sneaker", and a cover of the Smokey Robinson track "Get Ready" as the B-sides. "Goldfinger" was sent to US modern rock radio stations the following month. Ash went on a United Kingdom tour with 60ft Dolls, Bis, and Jocasta. Infectious and Home Grown released 1977 in the UK on 6 May, while the US release by Reprise appeared on 11 June 1996. The first 50,000 copies of the UK version included "Jack Names the Planets" and "Don't Know" as hidden tracks. Morris, who had taken an interest in various bands' artwork, suggested Ash collaborate with Brian Cannon of design company Microdot. Ed van der Elsken took the photograph that would appear on the front cover of 1977; Cannon said clearing the rights for the image nearly delayed the album's release as he had died, and the band were unable to contact his widow. The cassette edition was sold by the label at 1977 prices, £4.99.

Following the album's release, Ash embarked on a European tour, and appeared on Later... with Jools Holland. "Oh Yeah" was released as the album's fifth single on 24 June 1996, with "T. Rex", "Everywhere Is All Around", and the ABBA cover "Does Your Mother Know" as the B-sides. The "Oh Yeah" music video sees Hamilton making out with an actress, interspersed with footage of the band performing at a carnival. In July and August 1996, the band toured the US with Muzzle, and performed at the Reading Festival in the UK. Around this time, their label discussed releasing "Lost in You" as a single; however, the band felt they had released enough tracks from it by this point. In September and October 1996, Ash toured Japan, Australia, and New Zealand, before returning to the US with Stabbing Westward, I Mother Earth and Drill in October and November.

During the US leg of the tour, Ash met with the head programmer at MTV, to discuss getting coverage on the channel, however, Wheeler turned up late and drunk. The following day, the band had an interview on the channel; Wheeler arrived late again and vomited during it. The band's label was angry with them, and Wheeler later theorised that these incidents cost the band any major success in the US. One show of this leg, namely in Boulder, Colorado, had low ticket sales; as an incentive, Ash opted to perform 1977 in its entirety. They then supported Weezer on their US headlining tour through to December, before returning to Ireland for a one-off show to close the year.

Ash released their first live album, Live at the Wireless, in February 1997. Recorded in Australia, it was sold in the UK and mainland Europe. Some European copies of 1977 were then packaged with Live at the Wireless as a second disc in collaboration between Home Grown, Infectious, Death Star, and Facedown Records. In the same month, the band embarked on a European tour with 60 ft Dolls and Seesaw, leading up to five consecutive shows at the London Astoria. Fan club members attending the Astoria shows were given a free 7" vinyl, which consisted of "I Only Want to Be with You", "Devil's Haircut", and a live version of "Kung Fu". In June 1997, the band played a handful of UK shows with Silver Sun, before appearing at Glastonbury Festival.

=== Reissues and related releases ===
"Goldfinger", "Girl from Mars", "Kung Fu", "Oh Yeah" and "Angel Interceptor" were included on the band's three compilation albums, Intergalactic Sonic 7″s (2003), The Best of Ash (2011), and Teenage Wildlife: 25 Years of Ash (2020), and released on 7" vinyl as part of 94–'04 The 7" Singles Box Set (2014). In 2008, a three-disc deluxe edition of 1977 was released, featuring Trailer, Live at the Wireless, B-sides, unreleased demos and live recordings. BMG bought the band's back catalogue and reissued the album on CD in 2018 and vinyl in 2022; for the latter, Wheeler was sent various mixes and had to point out the correct versions to the label. The band have played the album in its entirety on several tours throughout 2008, 2013 and 2016, as well as a one-off livestream in 2021. Recordings from the Astoria shows were later compiled, and released as the live album Live on Mars – London Astoria 1997 (2016).

== Critical reception ==
Original release
Review scores
Source	Rating
AllMusic	4.5/5 stars
Alternative Press	3/5
The Guardian	4/5 stars
NME	7/10
The Philadelphia Inquirer	3/4 stars
Q	4/5 stars

1977 was met with generally positive reviews from music critics. AllMusic reviewer Stephen Thomas Erlewine said that, by "sticking to the rigid rules of American punk-pop", Ash opted for a "cinematic approach to their songs", resulting in 1977 being a "melting pot of pop styles". He added their use of "loud guitars" offers a "distinctive, melodic, and energetic sound that's equal parts heavy grunge and light pop". Ox-Fanzine's Joachim Hiller wrote that if the listener was "looking for the missing link between Oasis and Elastica, [they] should find it here," adding that the band's "mixture of girl seductive sugar pop and evil grater guitars with seventies rock quotes" is everywhere, and is "very catchy and somehow as tasty as French fries". Porter said that while it was not a "perfect album, by any means, [... it was] more intelligent, more alive than the slightly condescending tone of the reviews suggest".

Mark Jenkins of The Washington Post wrote that if he were to "judge only from the guitar squall" opening the album, it would appear that "the band prefers noise to melody" as previously shown on Trailer; however, he felt the "balance has shifted on this disc", with it showcasing "classic tunefulness over raw aggression". Q reviewer Andrew Collins said the album "benefits from having its raw power harnessed" by Morris and was "pulled off with 100 per cent enthusiasm; hey, these boys make pointless distorted introductions [to some songs] sound like fun." NME's Johnny Cigarettes wrote that with "a single listen", he was certain the band had "cured themselves" of becoming generic, as he had noted with their early singles. He added that "[w]hat invariably saves them from mature-rock-band hell, just as it has saved them from generic-indie-band hell are those simple, honest, priceless standbys - top-hole tunes".

Tim Hulsizer of Consumable Online wrote that 1977 was "every bit as fun and catchy" as Trailer, going on to call it a "very cohesive, fluid album". MTV writer Michael Krugman said that the album saw the band "teetering on the brink of maturity--only they're plainly fighting it by throwing their weight in the other direction". He mentions the album "occasionally trips over its own giant steps", noting a couple of generic and underdeveloped tracks, before citing the album's "real flaw...lies in the hands of someone who should have known better", criticising Morris' "excessively noisy and often quite murky" production, stating the "punk rock gets muddied, while experimental bits...are strangely obscured". Victoria Segal of Melody Maker was dismissive of the album, stating that it "never aspires to be anything beyond My Guy indie, boys-next-door making music for girls-next-door".

=== Retrospective reviews ===
Retrospective reviews
Review scores
Source	Rating
Alternative Rock	7/10
Drowned in Sound	8/10
The Irish Times	4/5 stars
Mojo	4/5 stars

Drowned in Sound reviewer Joss Albert called 1977 an "album by the young for the young". He said that while it was not "perfect or complete, the severe hooks of the best of the Brut smothered tunes will always get 1977's name mentioned". Spectrum Culture contributor John L. Murphy noted that in spite of the "clear influences and the passage of time, 1977 still sounds fresh", with "fast pop dominat[ing]" after the initial listen. Only "repeated airings reveal craft in softer songs", their "cinematic" scope, and "sentimental" lyrics. BBC Music's Mike Diver wrote that the album was likely "remembered by those who shared in its sentiments – written by a trio of teenagers, for an audience of the same, it preoccupied itself with chugging alcohol, chasing after girls and messing about with martial arts". Thompson praised the band for "pull[ing] their disparate styles together by gluing the joints with a coat of indie rock – which amazingly does the trick."

The Irish Times writer Brian Boyd said the band "come racing out of the traps with a giddy pop sound", though he was "not sure why the band feel the need to release [a triple disc edition] ... as this will surely only appeal to their fanbase. But maybe's that the point." Record Collector reviewer Emmy Watts described the album as a "grungy slice of Britpop" that "has not aged well". She noted that at the time, the "rough spontaneity" of Wheeler's "flat vocals" and McMurray's "muffled drumming" aided their inexperience, however, "the original format just highlights the recording's poor quality". "Sick Party" was included on Pitchfork's 2010 list of "ten unusual CD-era gimmicks".

== Commercial performance and accolades ==
1977 peaked at number one in the UK; while Porter said it sold 165,000 copies in its first week, Bowler and Dray estimated the opening sales to be around 122,000 copies. It became the first album from an Irish group to debut at number one in the UK. It also reached number five in Scotland, number 14 in New Zealand, number 18 in Australia, number 26 in Finland and Norway, number 40 in Switzerland, number 44 in Sweden, number 65 in Germany, and number 75 in the Netherlands. The album was certified platinum by the British Phonographic Industry in the UK.

"Kung Fu" charted at number 57 in the UK. "Girl from Mars" charted at number 11 in the UK. "Angel Interceptor" charted at number 14 in the UK, and "Goldfinger" charted at number five in the UK, and number 50 in Australia. "Oh Yeah" charted at number six in the UK.

1977 is included in the book 1001 Albums You Must Hear Before You Die; it is ranked at 417 on the NME poll of the 500 greatest albums of all time.

Accolades for 1977
Publication	List	Rank	Ref.
Alternative Press	Best punk albums of 1996	N/A	
Robert Dimery Michael Lydon	1001 Albums You Must Hear Before You Die	N/A	
Hot Press	100 Greatest Irish Albums	17	
NME	The 500 Greatest Albums of All Time	417	

== Track listing ==
Writing credits per booklet. All recordings produced by Owen Morris and Ash.

No.	Title	Writer(s)	Length
1.	"Lose Control"	Mark Hamilton; Tim Wheeler	3:37
2.	"Goldfinger"	Wheeler	4:31
3.	"Girl from Mars"	Wheeler	3:30
4.	"I'd Give You Anything"	Wheeler	4:31
5.	"Gone the Dream"	Wheeler	3:29
6.	"Kung Fu"	Wheeler	2:17
7.	"Oh Yeah"	Wheeler	4:45
8.	"Let It Flow"	Wheeler	4:42
9.	"Innocent Smile"	Mark Hamilton	5:52
10.	"Angel Interceptor"	Wheeler; Rick McMurray	4:04
11.	"Lost in You"	Wheeler	4:19
12.	"Darkside Lightside" (includes hidden track "Sick Party"; not on all versions)	Wheeler	16:49
Total length:			61:52

== Personnel ==
Personnel per deluxe booklet.

Ash

- Mark Hamilton – bass
- Rick McMurray – drums
- Tim Wheeler – guitar, vocals, string arrangements

Additional musicians

- Nick Ingman – string arrangements
- Lisa Moorish – extra vocals (track 7)

Production

- Owen Morris – producer, string arrangements
- Ash – producer, interior photography
- Nick Brine – studio assistant
- Sorrel Merchant – studio assistant
- Neil Kiely – studio assistant
- Phil Thornalley – mixing (track 3)
- Mark "Spike" Stent – mixing (track 10)

Design

- Brian Cannon – design, sleeve director, interior photography
- Mark Hamilton – artwork assistant
- Ed van der Eisken – cover photography
- Ash – interior photography
- Rolant Dafis – interior photography

== Charts and certifications ==
=== Weekly charts ===
Chart performance for 1977
Chart (1996)	Peak position
Australian Albums (ARIA)	18
Dutch Albums (Album Top 100)	75
Finnish Albums (Suomen virallinen lista)	26
German Albums (Offizielle Top 100)	65
New Zealand Albums (RMNZ)	14
Norwegian Albums (VG-lista)	26
Scottish Albums (Official Charts)	5
Swedish Albums (Sverigetopplistan)	44
Swiss Albums (Schweizer Hitparade)	40
UK Albums (Official Charts)	1

=== Year-end charts ===
1996 year-end chart performance for 1977
Chart (1996)	Position
UK Albums (OCC)	31

=== Certifications ===
Certifications for 1977
Region	Certification	Certified units/sales
United Kingdom (BPI)	Platinum	300,000^{^}
^{^} Shipments figures based on certification alone.
