= Hyperbubble + Manda Rin =

EP by Hyperbubble, Manda Rin
- Released: February 14, 2013
- Recorded: Texas, U.S. Glasgow, Scotland
- Genre: Synthpop, electropop
- Length: 13:39
- Language: English
- Label: Pure Pop For Now People (Germany)
- Producer: Jeff Decuir, Jess DeCuir, Manda Rin, Stuart Memo

Hyperbubble, Manda Rin chronology
Rollerboogie Babydoll (2009)	Hyperbubble + Manda Rin (2013)	Better Set Your Phasers to Stun – The Next Generation (2014)

Hyperbubble + Manda Rin is an EP released by German label Pure Pop For Now People. It debuted as a CD and digital download on February 14, 2013 in the U.S. The recording was the second collaboration between the American synthpop/electropop duo Hyperbubble and Scottish singer Manda Rin.

== History ==
Hyperbubble previously collaborated with Rin on the 2011 album, Drastic Cinematic, in which she contributed vocals to the well received "Geometry" and its remix by Haberdashery on the album's U.K. reissue. The EP reprised her vocals for a sequel, entitled "Geometry II".

Rin also fronted the songs "Hello Heaven Operator" and "In the Movies". A music video for "In the Movies" debuted a week after the EP release on February 21. The video was directed by members of Hyperbubble with animation by Jeff DeCuir.

Hyperbubble member Jess DeCuir handled lead vocals on "Kamikaze Coma". The track included backing vocals by Monanani Palermo of Femme Fatality, a band that had previously collaborated with Hyperbubble. The last song, "Attack of the 3D Space Kittens", sampled Rin's cat Aikiko and the DeCuirs' cats Smokey and Flyboy. The back of the CD cover included photos of the artists with their cats.

The album integrated sound effects created by Hyperbubble's Jeff DeCuir using Pop Rocks, 7-Up and a Bee Gees lunch box. It was produced in part by Stuart Memo, a former band member of Data Panik and later, a member of Bis. Memo also previously engineered the track "Geometry" on Drastic Cinematic.

== Critical reception ==
Professional ratings
Review scores
Source	Rating
Puro Pinche	5.5/10 stars
Alternative Press Magazine	2/5 stars
Side-Line Music Magazine	7/10 stars

Craig Haggis of the review site Porky Prime Cuts named Hyperbubble + Manda Rin one of their top ten favorite albums for 2013. The EP provided a unique sound through the mix of Manda Rin's "sweet pop" and the "electric bubblepop" of Hyperbubble. Critics found that the music recalled '80s new wave music and once again revealed Hyperbubble's "passion for vintage electronics." The track "Hello Heaven Operator" represented the "most obviously Devo-influenced of the lot" "with Rin's vocal at its finest."

One review likened the music to "early Depeche Mode at one stage then sounding like a microwave gone crazy the next." Together with its "cartoon themes," a complaint was that it came off as "annoying"; however one complainant observed that "after multiple listens it proves to be so damn catchy and scattered that it's kinda refreshing." The consistent theme through the recording was a focus on danceability and fun.

== Track listing ==
All songs written and arranged by Jeff DeCuir.

No.	Title	Guest musician(s)	Length
1.	"Message from Beyond"		0:25
2.	"Geometry II"		2:16
3.	"Hello Heaven Operator"		2:44
4.	"In the Movies"		3:04
5.	"Kamikaze Coma"	Monanani Palermo	2:32
6.	"Attack of the 3-D Space Kittens"	Aikiko, Smokey, Flyboy	2:38

== Personnel ==
=== Musicians ===
- Jess DeCuir – lead vocals, backing vocals, Theremin, synthesizer, Stylophone, organ
- Jeff DeCuir – backing vocals, Sequencers, Vocoder, synthesizer, sound effects
- Manda Rin – lead vocals, Backing vocals

=== Additional personnel ===
- Monanani Palermo – Backing vocals
- Aikiko, Smokey, Flyboy – Sampled voices

=== Production ===
- Producers – Jeff Decuir, Jess DeCuir, Manda Rin, Stuart Memo
- Digital mastering – Carl Saff
- Artwork – Jeff DeCuir
- Photography – Jeff DeCuir, Jess DeCuir, Manda Rin
