= Drastic Cinematic =

Studio album by Hyperbubble
- Released: April 2, 2011 (Germany)
- Recorded: April 2010 – February 2011, Uncle Buzz Studio, San Antonio, TX, Digital City Studio, Dublin, Ireland, & Planetmanda Studio, Glasgow, Scotland
- Genre: Synthpop, electropop
- Length: 27:32 (Germany); 39:37 (UK Director's Cut reissue)
- Language: English
- Label: Pure Pop For Now People (Germany); Bubblegum Records (UK) (July 1, 2011 Director's Cut reissue)
- Producer: Jess and Jeff DeCuir

Hyperbubble chronology
Candy Apple Daydreams (2010)	Drastic Cinematic (2011)	Attack of the Titans (2014)

Drastic Cinematic is an LP by the American synthpop/electropop band Hyperbubble from German label Pure Pop For Now People. Guest vocals on the title track were provided by Aidan Casserly of Empire State Human, with whom the band would later work on the single, "Aidan Casserly Vs. Hyperbubble". The song "Geometry" included vocals by Manda Rin of the Scottish bands Bis and Data Panik as well as sampled sounds from her cat, Akiko. The song was later reprised in a second collaboration with the singer on the EP Hyperbubble + Manda Rin.

== Release history ==
The album was released twice. It debuted in Europe and North America on April 2, 2011 as an edition of 100 copies with handmade covers.

A CD/MP3 reissue of this limited edition vinyl album, Drastic Cinematic – Director's Cut, debuted on July 1, 2011 through Bubblegum. The reissue shared the same front cover and added three remixes by I European, Haberdashery and Mark Towns, who previously worked on Hits! The Very Best of Erasure.

The album included "Welcome To Infinity Pt. 1" and "Pt. 2". An earlier upbeat and poppy version "Welcome to Infinity (Singles Only Mix)" was released earlier in the year as a single by UK Bubblegum Records. The "B" side included the reissue's less frenetic I European mix. The original track was later added to the band's 2017 compilation album, Pretty Plastic with a slight parenthetical change to the title – "(Singles Club Mix)".

The group released a music video for the single "Explosive" on Mar 21, 2013. The video directed by Hyperbubble member Jeff DeCuir was shot on location at Portmeiron in Wales as an homage to the TV series, The Prisoner.

The first track on the album, "Vox Noir", was used in the soundtrack for a 2012 stop-motion film by Sabra Booth.

== Critical reception ==
Professional ratings
Review scores
Source	Rating
babysue	5/5 stars
laganzua.net	6/10 stars
music-scan.de	7/10 stars
Peek-a-boo music magazine	(8.2/10)
San Antonio Current	4.5/5 stars
ReGen Magazine	4/5 stars

With Drastic Cinematic, Hyperbubble produced what was variously dubbed a tribute to soundtrack composers of the '70s and '80s, "a film-noir/futuristic soundtrack," and "a soundtrack for an imaginary Jean-Luc Goddard [sic] film" – the French director to whom the CD version is dedicated. A reviewer for ReGen magazine described the music as "evocative of ever changing tensions in its fictional narrative backbone... [that] unlike classic electronic acts occupied with film scores like Tangerine Dream, ...is not constrained by the necessity to remain committed to one mood or a singular theme." The compositions included cameo vocals "with distinctive accents ... to add foreign intrigue," "little dialogues in English, French and German" and even the Wilhelm scream. Hyperbubble utilizes "their slick melodies as themes instead of verses or choruses, per se, and lets listeners fill in the gaps."

The album constituted a change from the band's usual cartoon bubblepunk to more dark and atmospheric moods or "black and white audio noir," though still a continuation of "Hyperbubble's commitment to retro," such as in "Geometry" – "an old school synth track that's very catchy." Peek-a-boo Music Magazine noted that the vocals "in combination with the drums and synthmelodies give ... a Kraftwerk-feeling." The three bonus tracks provided more conventional synthpop.

babysue called it "a non-stop fun experience from start to finish. Totally cool upbeat modern pop tunes presented with gutsy imagination and plenty of style."

== Track listing ==
All songs written by Jess and Jeff DeCuir

Side one
No.	Title	Guest musician(s)	Length
1.	"Voix Noir"		2:30
2.	"Midnight Cruiser"		2:44
3.	"Drastic Cinematic"	Aidan Casserly, Beatrice Rougier	3:30
4.	"Rue Des Dames"	Gavin DeCuir	1:24
5.	"Geometry"	Manda Rin, Akiko	2:16

Side two
No.	Title	Guest musician(s)	Length
1.	"Blame It On The Bot"	Bryan Stanchak	1:25
2.	"Explosive"		2:34
3.	"Quiet On The Set"	Joachim Gaertner	2:41
4.	"Welcome To Infinity Pt.1"		3:10
5.	"Welcome To Infinity Pt.2"	Joli Stokes, Armand Rougier	5:18

Director's Cut bonus tracks
No.	Title	Guest musician(s)	Length
11.	"Welcome To Infinity (Remix by I European)"	Armand Rougier	3:49
12.	"Geometry (Remix by Haberdashery)"	Manda Rin	2:47
13.	"Welcome To Infinity (Markymix)"		5:29

== Personnel ==
=== Musicians ===
- Jess DeCuir – Lead Vocals, Keyboards, Electronic Drum Pads
- Jeff DeCuir – Backing vocals, Sequencer, Synthesizers, Vocoder

=== Additional personnel ===
- Akiko – Sampled voice
- Aidan Casserly – Vocals
- Gavin DeCuir – Synthesizer
- Joachim Gaertner – Spoken vocals
- Manda Rin – Vocals
- Beatrice Rougier – Spoken vocals
- Armand Rougier – Spoken vocals
- Bryan Stanchak – Spoken vocals
- Joli Stokes – French Horn

=== Production ===
- Producers – Jess and Jeff DeCuir
- Head Engineer – Jeff DeCuir
- Engineer for Aidan Casserly vocals, Side 1, Track 3 – Aidan Casserly
- Engineer for Beatrice Rougier and Armand Rougier vocals, Side 1, Track 3 and Side 2, Track 5 – Armand Rougier
- Engineer for Joachim Gaertner vocals, Side 2, Track 3 – Joachim Gaertner
- Engineer for Manda Rin and Akiko vocals, Side 1, Track 5 – Stuart Memo
- Design – Jeff DeCuir
- Photography – Joe Wallace
