= Uncle Pat =

Single by Ash

from the album Trailer
- B-side: "Different Today", "Hulk Hogan Bubblebath"
- Released: 17 October 1994
- Recorded: 1994
- Genre: Punk rock
- Length: 3:13
- Label: Infectious
- Songwriter(s): Tim Wheeler
- Producer(s): Mark Waterman

Ash singles chronology
| "Petrol" (1994) | "Uncle Pat" (1994) | "Kung Fu" (1995) |

"Uncle Pat" is a song by Ash, released as the third single from their album Trailer, released on 17 October 1994. It was released as a single CD and a 7" vinyl. It peaked at #101 in the UK.

The B-side "Different Today" first appeared on the "Shed" demo tape, and also features on the US release of "Trailer".

The song was also used on a Heineken advert.

== Track listing ==
1. "Uncle Pat" (Wheeler)
2. "Different Today" (Wheeler)
3. "Hulk Hogan Bubblebath" (Ash)
