= Girl from Mars =

1995 single by Ash

Single by Ash

from the album 1977
- B-side: "Astral Conversations with Toulouse-Lautrec"; "Cantina Band"
- Released: 31 July 1995
- Genre: Britpop; pop-punk; pop rock; bubblegum rock
- Length: 3:30
- Label: Infectious; Home Grown
- Songwriter: Tim Wheeler
- Producer: Owen Morris

Ash singles chronology
"Kung Fu" (1995)	"Girl from Mars" (1995)	"Angel Interceptor" (1995)

"Girl from Mars" is a song by Northern Irish band Ash, the second to be released from their debut studio album, 1977 (1996). The song was written by Tim Wheeler when he was sixteen and was played by the band on their first Top of the Pops appearance two weeks after their A-level exams. It was released on 31 July 1995 on CD, 7-inch vinyl, and cassette formats. "Girl from Mars" was Ash's first top-forty single, reaching number 11 on the UK Singles Chart, number five on the Icelandic Singles Chart and number 16 on the Irish Singles Chart. It also peaked at number 86 in Australia in March 1997.

The song is included on the greatest hits collection Intergalactic Sonic 7″s, the soundtrack to the television program Gilmore Girls "Our Little Corner of the World", and live versions can be found on their Live at the Wireless album, the Tokyo Blitz DVD and the Numbskull EP. The track has also been used by NASA as the hold music on their telephone lines.

== Music video ==
Two different videos exist for the single. The first, the UK promo video, was directed by Peter Christopherson and is described by the band as a "cross between 'Give It Away' by the Red Hot Chili Peppers and the 'Natrel Plus' TV ad". The band (especially drummer Rick McMurray) hated the video so much that when the time came to release the song in America, they re-filmed it. Directed by Jesse Peretz (who also directed Foo Fighters's "Big Me" video), the video sees Ash playing the song as part of an art exhibition, and mesmerizing a small girl watching the band.

== Track listing ==
CD, 7-inch, cassette single

1. "Girl from Mars" (Wheeler)
2. "Astral Conversations with Toulouse-Lautrec" (Ash)
3. "Cantina Band" (John Williams)

== Charts ==
Chart (1995–1997)	Peak position
Australia (ARIA)	86
Iceland (Íslenski Listinn Topp 40)	5
Ireland (IRMA)	16
Scottish Singles Sales (Official Charts)	14
UK Singles (Official Charts)	11
UK Indie (Music Week)	1

== Certifications ==
Region	Certification	Certified units/sales
United Kingdom (BPI)	Gold	400,000^{‡}
^{‡} Sales+streaming figures based on certification alone.

== Release history ==
Region	Date	Format(s)	Label(s)	Ref.
United Kingdom	31 July 1995	7-inch vinyl; CD; cassette	Infectious; Home Grown	
Australia	13 November 1995	CD; cassette	Liberation; Infectious	
