= International Academy of Design and Technology San Antonio =

Former for-profit art school in San Antonio, Texas

Coordinates: 29.5186°N 98.5581°W

IADT San Antonio
- Type: For-profit
- Active: 2005–2018
- President: Gilbert De Leon
- Academic staff: 25 full-time, 35 part-time
- Students: 400 full-time
- Location: San Antonio, Texas, USA
- Website: http://www.iadtsanantonio.com/

International Academy of Design and Technology - San Antonio was one location of the International Academy of Design and Technology. It was a for-profit college offering specialized associate degrees in various types of design.

The IADT – San Antonio campus was established in 2005 and inaugurated on April 2, 2007. IADT San Antonio/Sanford-Brown College - San Antonio was put into "teach out" status in 2015. The campus no longer enrolled students and closed on January 12, 2018.

== Academics/Specialized Degree Offerings ==
- Associate & Bachelor of Applied Science Degrees in Graphic Design included instruction in digital imaging, computer illustration, desktop publishing and prepress skills.
- Associate & Bachelor of Applied Science Degrees in Fashion Design and Marketing included courses in pattern drafting, draping, clothing construction and creative design techniques.

== Admissions ==
Potential students were free to come to the campus during operating hours. At that time one could request to sit with an admissions representative for an interview and tour of the facility. Upon completion of the interview and tour, the admissions representative recommended the potential student if there was a proven desire to be successful in completing one of the programs offered at the school. At this point, a second interview was done by the Director of Admissions. If accepted, the student had to provide proof of graduation from high school or an equivalency. The student had to pay an enrollment processing fee and meet with a tuition planner for a personalized packaging session. Financial Aid was available for those that qualify.

== About Campus ==
IADT – San Antonio’s campus included a 30,000-square-foot (2,800 m^{2}) freestanding facility with classrooms, lecture rooms, instructional laboratories, computer labs, a library, a bookstore and admissions, academic and administration staff offices.

== Accreditation ==
The International Academy of Design & Technology was accredited by the Accrediting Council for Independent Colleges and Schools (ACICS) The International Academy of Design & Technology was Approved and Regulated by the Texas Workforce Commission, Career Schools and Veterans Education Section, Austin, Texas and was approved by the U.S. Department of Education to participate in Title IV financial aid programs. The International Academy of Design & Technology is a member of the Career College Association.

== Map ==
- Map of San Antonio
