= Kung Fu (Ash song) =

Single by Ash

from the album 1977
- B-side: "Day of the Triffids", "Luther Ingo's Star Cruiser"
- Released: 20 March 1995
- Recorded: 27 December 1994
- Genre: Power pop; pop-punk
- Length: 2:17
- Label: Infectious
- Songwriter(s): Tim Wheeler
- Producer(s): Owen Morris

Ash singles chronology
"Uncle Pat" (1994)	"Kung Fu" (1995)	"Girl from Mars" (1995)

"Kung Fu" is a song by the band Ash, released as the first single from their album, 1977. It was released in March 1995 as a CD single, limited edition 7-inch, and standard 7-inch vinyl. The song was written by Tim Wheeler and produced by Owen Morris.

== Writing and recording ==
The song was written by Tim Wheeler in five minutes on Boxing Day 1994 at Belfast International Airport and recorded in one take on the following day. The song was recorded on the Verve's equipment, who were nearby recording their A Northern Soul album at the same time.

The song lyrics reference martial arts movie star Jackie Chan and the song was used in the advertising and during the bloopers at the end of the American release of Chan's film Rumble in the Bronx. Additionally, the song's intro is a sample from kung-fu flick Close Encounters of the Spooky Kind, starring Sammo Hung, which was being shown as part of a Channel 4 Kung-Fu film season shown over Christmas of that year. It is Hung's voice that can be heard in the sample.

When performed live, "Kung Fu" traditionally closed the band's sets in a two-minute rendition but was later moved to an earlier slot in the setlist. On the Nu-Clear Sounds tour, it ran to around 5 minutes, with a DJ filling the song with martial arts and computer game noises. Live versions of the song appear on the Barbie 7” EP and the Ash album Live at the Wireless.

The song appears on 1977, Intergalactic Sonic 7″s, Ash's first greatest hits collection, and the Tokyo Blitz DVD. The song appeared with Ash's earlier single "Jack Names the Planets" on the film soundtrack of Angus.

== B-sides ==
The single was backed with two B-sides. The first B-side, "Day of the Triffids", tells an apocalyptic story of an invasion by aliens, and appears on the Cosmic Debris B-sides collection. It also appears on the US version of Trailer.

The second B-side, "Luther Ingo's Star Cruiser" was written by Wheeler and Mark Hamilton and is infamous for having uncommonly explicit lyrics. This was the B-side of the standard 7-inch vinyl (INFECT 21S) but since it was unsuitable for use in jukeboxes, another version (INFECT 21J) was pressed with "Day of the Triffids" as the B-side. This version was also released as a numbered limited edition.

== Release and reception ==
The single reached number 57 on the UK Singles Chart, and the sleeve pictured footballer Eric Cantona's kick on a spectator that occurred in January 1995. A music video directed by Steven Wells and Nick Small was also filmed. It consists of the band playing the song in concert, and occasionally footage of different people performing martial arts moves are cut in to the video.

The song was received warmly with NME awarding it 'Single of the Week', while Eric Cantona's kick on a spectator would top Q magazine's list of Top 50 Most Rock 'n Roll Moments of 1995.

== Track listing ==
All tracks written and composed by Tim Wheeler; except where indicated.

=== 7-inch: Infectious Records / INFECT21S (UK) ===
Side one

1. "Kung Fu" - 2:17

Side two

1. "Luther Ingo's Star Cruiser" (Hamilton/Wheeler) - 1:45

=== CD: Infectious Records / INFECT21CD (UK) ===
1. "Kung Fu" - 2:17
2. "Day of the Triffids" - 3:32
3. "Luther Ingo's Star Cruiser" (Hamilton/Wheeler) - 1:45

=== CD: Reprise Records / 2-17706 (US) ===
1. "Kung Fu (album version)" - 2:22
2. "Jack Names the Planets (album version)" - 3:13

=== Limited Edition 7-inch: Infectious Records / INFECT21J (Japan) ===
Side one

1. "Kung Fu"

Side two

1. "Day of the Triffids"
