= Better Set Your Phasers to Stun =

EP by Hyperbubble
- Released: July 1, 2009
- Recorded: 2008–2009, Uncle Buzz Studio, San Antonio, TX, Murray Ramone's, Edinburgh, Scotland & Box, Glasgow
- Genre: Synthpop, electropop
- Length: 14:44 (UK); 14:06 (US The Next Generation reissue)
- Language: English
- Label: Bubblegum Records (UK); Socket Sounds (US)
- Producer: Jess and Jeff DeCuir

Hyperbubble chronology
Christmas with The Bee Gees (2008)	Better Set Your Phasers to Stun (2009)	Rollerboogie Babydoll (2009)

Better Set Your Phasers to Stun is a 2009 EP by the American synthpop/electropop group Hyperbubble. The recording was in collaboration with the Welsh band Helen Love. The title tracks cover Love's 2000 song with the Star Trek reference. The cover art furnished images of the series' signature phaser weapon.

== Release history ==
The album was released twice. It debuted as a CD and digital download on July 1, 2009. The EP was the first release by U.K. label Bubblegum Records. The issue included a sharply different variation of Hyperbubble's "U.F.O. Party Beach", produced on the earlier album Tribute to John Williams from Winter Records and retitled, "Beach Party U.F.O." Further remixes retitled as "U.F.O. Beach Party" debuted on Candy Apple Daydreams and Candy Apple Nightmares to slightly mixed reviews.

The last track "Disgow Glasgow" included a live segment from a May 5, 2008 concert at the bar and club Box in Glasgow. The song itself was recorded at a place owned by Murray Ramone of the Scottish punk band Shock and Awe in Edinburgh.

The CD was reissued in 2014 under the Socket Sounds label as Better Set Your Phasers To Stun – The Next Generation. The album replaced the last two tracks with new mixes of the title song.

The release consisted of a hand-numbered edition of one hundred copies, twenty-five of which were sold via Facebook. The remainder were sold at a multi-band concert at The Lexington hosted by Helen Love that was recorded for their Live in London album. It featured an "amusing" version "Better Set Your Phasers To Stun" by Hyperbubble.

All versions of the title song on both releases included a vocal track furnished by Love of their 1995 single "We Love You", except the "Suspended Animation Ambient Mix." This track was described as "all but [dispensing] with the original tune and provides a pleasing atmospheric break [on the CD]." It was included along with "Disgow Glasgow" in their 2017 compilation, Pretty Plastic.

== Critical reception ==
The EP had a generally positive reception by critics, with Connexion Bizarre awarding it seven out of ten stars. British publisher tasty fanzine concluded that the listener "will either love this or seriously hate it [as] it's right at the most synthetic and twee end of the synthetic tweepop stick." The music was variously described as "infuriatingly catchy", "new wave/synthpop confection" and "retro fun and bouncy throwaway pop music."

The last two tracks are stylistically different from the rest of the EP; one critic suggested that the differences made the songs "more universally enjoyable (albeit in a nonsensical manner)." A detractor panned "Beach Party U.F.O." as "too sweet for most people," while the "slightly darker electro" "Disco Glasgow" was lauded for its danceability.

== Track listing ==
=== 2009 UK release: Bubblegum Records BGUM01 ===
All lyrics are written by Helen Love, except where noted.

No.	Title	Writer(s)	Guest musician(s)	Length
1.	"Better Set Your Phasers to Stun (Single Mix)"		Helen Love	2:48
2.	"Better Set Your Phasers to Stun (Summertime Stadium Remix)"		Helen Love	3:14
3.	"Better Set Your Phasers to Stun (Suspended Animation Ambient Mix)"			1:44
4.	"Beach Party U.F.O."	Hyperbubble		3:07
5.	"Disgow Glasgow"	Hyperbubble		3:51

=== 2014 US The Next Generation release: Socket Sounds UBR19 ===
First three tracks same as on original album

No.	Title	Guest musician(s)	Length
4.	"Better Set Your Phasers To Stun (2014 London Disco Mix)"	Helen Love	3:35
5.	"Better Set Your Phasers To Stun (Thrash-Tastic Mix)"	Helen Love	2:45

== Personnel ==
=== Musicians ===
- Jess DeCuir – Lead vocals, Vocoder, Keyboards, Electronic Drum Pads
- Jeff DeCuir – Vocals, Sequencers, Synthesizers, Drum machine

=== Additional personnel ===
- Helen Love – Vocals, Instrumentals

=== Production ===
- Producers – Jess and Jeff DeCuir
- Recordist for "Disgow Glasgow" – Peter Von Olum
- Head Engineer – Jeff DeCuir
- Design – Jeff DeCuir
- Photography – Joe Wallace
