= Live in London (Hyperbubble album) =

Live album by Hyperbubble
- Released: November 22, 2015 (Germany)
- Recorded: November 22, 2014, The Lexington, London
- Genre: Synthpop, electropop
- Length: 31:17
- Language: English
- Label: Pure Pop For Now People (Germany)
- Producer: Jess and Jeff DeCuir

Hyperbubble chronology
Dee Dee Rocks the Galaxy (2015)	Live in London (2015)	Music to Color By (2016)

Live in London is the first live album by American synthpop/electropop band Hyperbubble from German label Pure Pop For Now People. It debuted worldwide on November 22, 2015. It captures their November 22, 2014 show at The Lexington in London.

The performance was part of a concert hosted by Helen Love with whom they previously collaborated. It drew from their first three albums including their debut Sol!d Pop along with live versions of "Kinky" from their untitled 2004 compilation with S/T (informally called Hyperbubble + S/T, s/t hyperbubble split EP or Minicar) and their cover of Love's "Better Set Your Phasers to Stun" from Hyperbubble's eponymous 2009 EP. The latter song sampled another Love creation, "We Love You". The concert recording included a variation of "Red Delicious Overture" from their Candy Apple Daydreams album retitled, "Robo Intro".

Orders of the CD obtained through affiliate bandcamp included three Hyperbubble buttons.

== Critical reception ==
Professional ratings
Review scores
Source	Rating
babysue	5/5 stars
Chain D.L.K.	4/5 stars

Live in London is Hyperbubble's first live album, a "highly (sic) quality recording featuring a set that could be regarded as Hyperbubble's greatest hits," according to Chi Ming Lai of The Electricity Club and echoed elsewhere. One critic noted that the live show afforded listeners the opportunity to hear the band "let loose with [their] more structured songs. The result shows just how talented they are at re-inventing the synthpop wheel." Eleven music magazine further wrote, "the beats are aggressive but not overstated, the basslines bouncy and the synths pulsating beneath (lead vocalist) Jess’ exquisitely catchy vocals."

Generally commenting on their style, The Big Takeover magazine described Live in London as at "the edges of keyboard minimal, groove, like Danceteria flashbacks filtered through modern noise. It's upbeat and happy, putting electric dreams with twitches of Devo, Thomas Dolby, and Saturday morning cartoons into your mind."

== Track listing ==
All lyrics are written by Jess and Jeff DeCuir, except where noted.

No.	Title	Length
1.	"Robo Intro"	0:40
2.	"Candy Apple Daydreams"	2:51
3.	"Girl Boy Pop Toy"	3:18
4.	"Synesthesia"	2:53
5.	"Nervous System"	2:37
6.	"Chop Shop Cop"	2:42
7.	"Kinky"	2:29
8.	"Vending Machine (Jeff DeCuir/Jess DeCuir/Joe Wallace)"	2:33
9.	"Non Biodegradable Hazardous Waste Disposal"	3:20
10.	"Solid Pop"	2:42
11.	"Bionic Girl"	2:11
12.	"Better Set Your Phasers to Stun (Helen Love)"	3:01

== Personnel ==
=== Musicians ===
- Jess DeCuir – Lead vocals, Theremin
- Jeff DeCuir – Backing vocals, Synthesizers, Vocoder

=== Production ===
- Producers – Jess and Jeff DeCuir
- Head Engineer – Jeff DeCuir
- Graphics – Jeff DeCuir
- Cover Photo – Trevor Odd Box
- Photography – Trevor Odd Box, Hyperbubble
- Hyperbubble Tour Button photo – Kent
