= Solid Pop =

Studio album by Hyperbubble
- Released: November 4, 2004
- Studio: Uncle Buzz Studios
- Genres: Synth-pop, electropop
- Length: 34:57; 38:25 (Remix Edition)
- Language: English
- Labels: Socket Sounds; Fellowshipwreck Music (Remix Edition)
- Producer: Zoltarr

Hyperbubble chronology
Solid Pop (2004)	Airbrushed Alibis (2007)

Solid Pop is the debut album by the American synth-pop/electropop band Hyperbubble. It is titled on the cover as Sol!d Pop. The replacement of "i" with an exclamation mark is carried through the song titles.

Later in 2005, Hyperbubble performed the first track "Mom Dad Unit" in their television debut on Great Day San Antonio on CBS affiliate KENS.

== Release history ==
The album was released on September 4, 2004, on CD and as a digital download under the Socket Sounds label in the U.S. Two "bonus" tracks are included in the album that are not listed on the cover, but are listed for the digital download: a remix entitled "Psychic Connection Mystery Mix" and an untitled reprise of "Leon".

The track "Another Ride" later appeared on the 2008 compilation Masters of the Universe Vol. 3. A remastered mix version was included on the compilation album Elektrowelt in 2007 from The Family Records (Italy) and Hyperbubble's 2017 Pretty Plastic.

Electronic Sound Magazine included the CD's final track, "Bionic Girl", in a 2018 Kraftwerk commemorative CD, Man & Machine, alongside songs by Devo, John Foxx, Chris Carter and Meat Beat Manifesto. Live versions of "Vending Machine", "Solid Pop" and "Bionic Girl" were later published on their 2015 Live in London album.

Fellowshipwreck Music issued a remix of the album by the band entitled, Solid Pop: The Remix Edition (presented on the cover as Sol!d Pop: The Rem!x Ed!t!on). It was released in 2005 as a digital download and saw limited release on CD at concerts the same year. As with the original, the remix album adds two extra tracks listed only on the digital version of the album. These songs include a second mix of "Psychic Connection" and the final track from the original album played backwards. One track, "Leon (Superchill Catnip Mix)", was re-released in 2006 under a new title, "Leon (Catnip Remix)".

The release generated two music videos. Hondo Aguilar directed the 2006 video for "Mom Dad Unit" and Hyperbubble member Jeff DeCuir directed one for "Bionic Girl" in 2007.

== Remixes by other bands ==
Several bands remixed tracks from Solid Pop. Versions of "Psychic Connection" and "Passing Phase" produced by Binaerpilot, Skyliber and Love in the Space Age appeared on the 2007 compilation Textronix Mix Tape from UK label Filthy Little Angels.

== Critical reception ==
Professional ratings
Review scores
Source	Rating
AllMusic	3.5/5 stars
PopMatters	6/10 stars

The album established Hyperbubble's feel of music: "very solid pop, derived from a merry never-neverland set somewhere on the cusp of the 1980s," with their music drawing comparisons to period groups like Devo, Blondie and Depeche Mode. The music showed that the band members' "pop-friendly impulses" from their work in a prior band, Pink Filth, translated excellently into Hyperbubble.

Described as "peppy synth pop par excellence", the album showcased their ability to apply "the breakneck pace of punk… to straight-up synthpop."

While the music was less of an "immediate 'take it to the dancefloor' impulse" as on later albums, it was overall a "cleaner sounding contrast to Ladytron's revivalism -- less grimy and cold, more perky and upbeat."

Solid Pop also showcased their use of sampling. The band's most popular downloaded song, "Leon", featured sounds from their cat.

== Track listing ==
All lyrics written by Jess and Jeff DeCuir (Hyperbubble), except where noted. Titles listed on the albums appear as they were spelled.

No.	Title	Writer(s)	Guest musician(s)	Length
1.	"Mom Dad Un!t"	Jeff DeCuir/Jess DeCuir/Joe Wallace		2:21
2.	"Pass!ng Phase"			2:49
3.	"Vend!ng Mach!ne"	Jeff DeCuir/Jess DeCuir/Joe Wallace		2:36
4.	"Moonbuggy"			1:49
5.	"Psych!c Connect!on"			3:41
6.	"Leon"		Leon, Noel	2:06
7.	"Share Your Toys"			2:33
8.	"Another R!de"			3:32
9.	"Pep Rally Blues"			3:06
10.	"Robofreq"			1:45
11.	"B!onic G!rl"			2:10
12.	"Sol!d Pop"			2:57
13.	"Psychic Connection Mystery Mix"			2:52
14.	"untitled bonus track"		Sydney, Abby, Isabel	0:40

== Sol!d Pop: The Rem!x Ed!t!on ==
No.	Title	Guest musician(s)	Length
1.	"Mom Dad Un!t (K!dd!e Coalm!ne M!x)"		2:47
2.	"Pass!ng Phase (Motorc!ty M!dn!ght M!x)"		3:28
3.	"Vend!ng Mach!ne (Funkbot M!x)"		2:33
4.	"Moonbuggy (Lunar Wheel!e M!x)"		1:31
5.	"Psych!c Connect!on (Crystal Ball M!x)"		5:22
6.	"Leon (Superch!ll Catn!p M!x)"	Leon, Noel	2:07
7.	"Share Your Toys (S!n!ster Playground M!x)"		2:34
8.	"Another R!de (Travolta Turnp!ke M!x)"		4:02
9.	"Pep Rally Blues (Devastat!ng Pom Pom M!x)"		2:44
10.	"Robofreq (Automated M!x)"		0:27
11.	"B!onic G!rl - (Goldman Groover M!x)"		2:22
12.	"Sol!d Pop (Splashdown M!x)"		2:54
13.	"Psychic Connection (Crystal Bass Mix)"		3:04
14.	"untitled bonus track"	Sydney, Abby, Isabel	2:30

== Personnel ==
=== Musicians ===
- Jess DeCuir – lead vocals, beyboards, drumtronics
- Jeff DeCuir – vocals, sequencer, synthesizers

=== Additional personnel ===
- Leon, Noel – sampled voices
- Sydney, Abby, Isabel – backing vocals

=== Production ===
- Producer – Zoltarr
- Remixes – Jeff Decuir
- Photography – Hyperbubble, Sabra Booth
- Cover art – Hyperbubble
