= Helen Love =

Welsh indie band

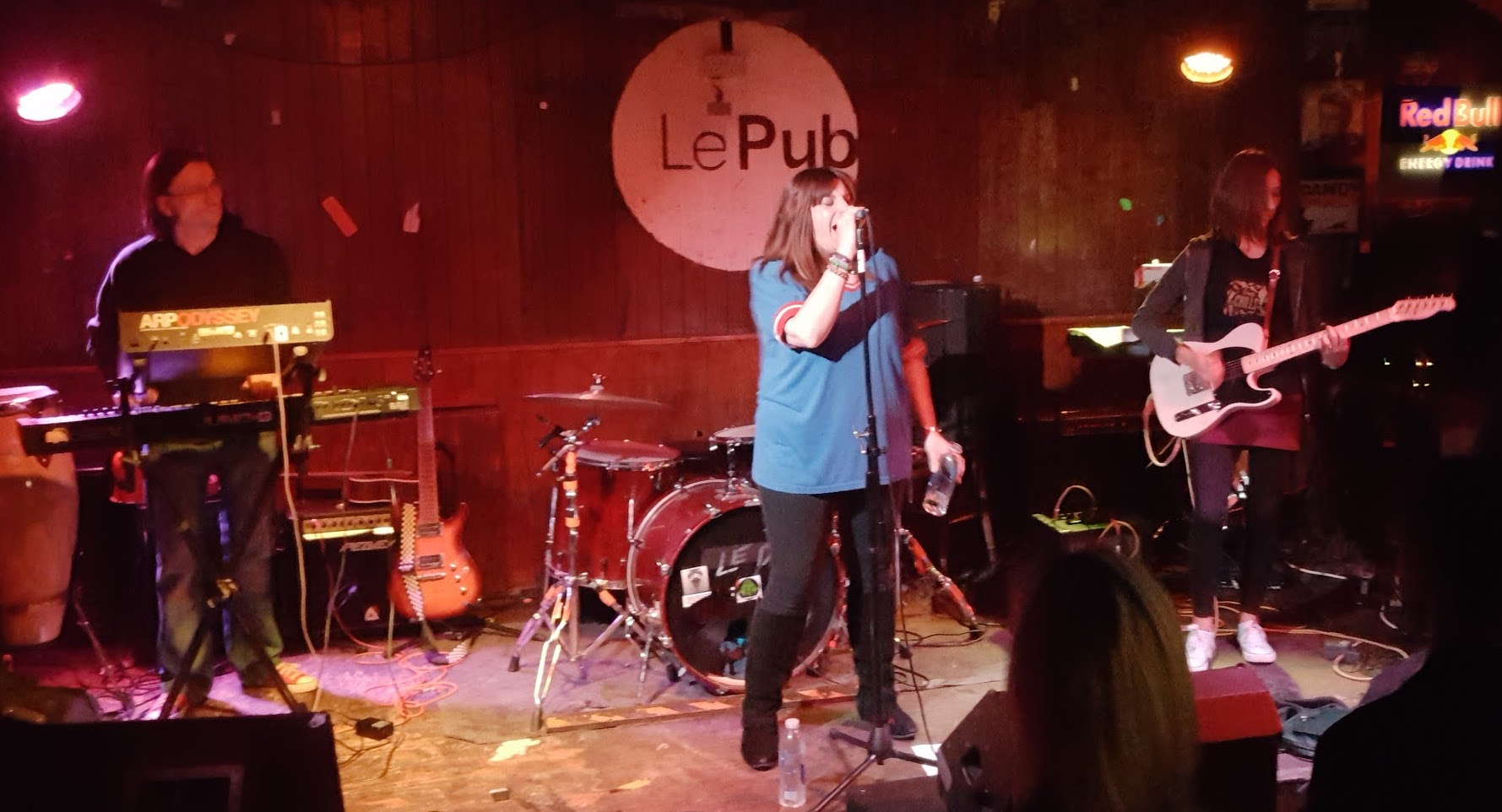

Background information
- Genres: Pop punk, indie pop bubblegum pop, dance-rock, happy hardcore
- Years active: 1992–present
- Labels: Damaged Goods (1993–1997; 2001–2002); Ché Trading (1997–2000); Elefant Records (2005–2015) Alcopop! Records (2015–present)
- Members: Helen Love; Sheena; Ricardo Autobahn
- Past members: Roxy; Mark; Corrine; Beth

Helen Love are an indie band from Wales whose music is a combination of punk rock, bubblegum pop and disco dance music. The band was formed in 1992 by Helen Love (vocals, guitar) with Sheena (guitar, keyboards), Roxy (bass, drum machine), and Mark (keyboards). Current members are Helen, Sheena and Ricardo Autobahn.

Helen Love released only singles and EPs until 2000, when their debut studio album Love and Glitter, Hot Days and Music was released. They have since released three more studio albums, It's My Club and I'll Play What I Want To (2007, Elefant) and Day-Glo Dreams (2013, Elefant), and Smash Hits (2016, Alcopop! Records). Damaged Goods released three compilations of tracks from the band's early singles and EPs, entitled Radio Hits (1994), Radio Hits 2 (1997) and Radio Hits 3 (2002).

The band have released recordings on many labels, including Damaged Goods, Che Trading, Sympathy for the Record Industry, Wurlizter Jukebox, Invicta Hi-Fi and Elefant Records. They are currently signed to Alcopop! records.

== History ==
The band was formed in 1992 by Helen Love (vocals, guitar) with Sheena (guitar, keyboards), Roxy (bass, drum machine), and Mark (keyboards). Current members are Helen, Sheena and Ricardo Autobahn.

The main thematic elements in their oeuvre are Joey Ramone, summer days and bubblegum music. Love claims only to listen to the music of the Ramones.

Helen Love released the album, It's My Club and I'll Play What I Want To, in the first week of November 2007 on Elefant Records in Spain and February 2008 in the UK.

Their lead singer also provided vocal tracks from "We Love You" for covers of their song, "Better Set Your Phasers to Stun", by American synthpop band Hyperbubble on their 2009 eponymous EP. The latter song later appeared on that band's Live in London album.

In 2013 they released the album Day-Glo Dreams. They supported this with their first gig since 2001 at the Indietracks festival, and then in November played at 100 Club for Damaged Goods 25th anniversary.

== Influence and notable fans ==
While none of their singles have reached the UK Top 40, Helen Love have developed a devoted cult following in indie circles, particularly at indie discos, with songs including "Long Live The UK Music Scene", "Shifty Disco Girl", "Does Your Heart Go Boom?", "We Love You", "Girl About Town", "Punk Boy" and "Debbie Loves Joey".

They recorded a session for John Peel in October 1997, and had three songs in his Festive Fifty.

Their songs have also been covered by Ash, The Queers, Katz and Tullycraft.

The band contributed a specially written song for the DVD release of Dave Gorman's Googlewhack Adventure. Gorman, a fan of the band, had previously played Helen Love songs to his audiences before he went on stage. Another big fan is Phill Jupitus, for whom the band composed the theme song for his Breakfast Show on BBC 6 Music.

=== Joey Ramoney ===
Helen Love's second single was titled "(Sheena's In Love With) Joey Ramoney", a tribute to the band's favourite singer. A play on the Ramones' song "Sheena Is a Punk Rocker", the single was brought to Joey's attention by the UK branch of the Ramones fan club. Joey subsequently invited the band to New York to play a gig.

Joey introduced the band's Evening Session on Radio 1, and duetted with Helen on the album version of "Punk Boy".

Helen provided backing vocals on the Joey Ramone album Don't Worry About Me, singing on the track "Mr. Punchy".

== Discography ==
=== Albums ===
Year	Title	Tracks	Label	Cat. no.	Format/Notes
2000	Love & Glitter, Hot Days and Music	Shifty Disco Girl; Jump Up and Down; Atomic Beat Boy; Who Stole The Starz; 2000MPHgirl; Love and Glitter, Hot Days and Musik; Does Your Heart Go BOOOOOOOMM; HappyHardCore; BigBigKiss; MC5; Punk Boy (with Joey Ramone); Better Set Your Phasers To Stun	Ché Trading	CHE87	CD only
2001	Love & Glitter, Hot Days and Musik (Damaged Goods reissue)	As above, plus the following bonus tracks: Automatic Disco Club; MC5; BigBigKiss; Jump Up and Down	Damaged Goods	DAMGOOD202	CD + LP; Bonus tracks taken from a 1999 New York radio session
2007	It's My Club And I'll Play What I Want To	It's My Club; Debbie loves Joey; Dance on (Solid Gold); You Better Learn Karate; The 1910 Fruitgum Company; Transistor Radio (Radio); Jet; First Boyfriend; Rodney's English Disco; Honolulu Superstar; Garageband; Queen Of The Discobeat; Staying IN; A New Squad Attacking Formation; Junkshop Discothèque; Saturday... NITE!!!	Elefant Records	ER-1129	CD + LP
2013	Day-Glo Dreams	We Are All The Lo-Fi Kids; Day-Glo Dreams; Shy Girl; My Imagination; Spin Those Records; Our Mum And Dad; Atomic; Don't Forget About This Town; J.Pop; You And Stacy; Teenage Soap Opera	Elefant Records	ER-1180	CD + LP
2016	Smash Hits	First Girl from Wales in New York; We've Got a Formula One Team; Thank You Polystyrene; You Can't Beat a Boy Who Loves the Ramones; Mario Kart Grand Prix; Spaceboy! Yes We're in a Band That We Love; Long Live the Modern Lovers; Sheila B. Devotion; No Hit Radio; Belle of St. Mark; Stardust and Glitter	Alcopop!		CD + LP
2020	Power On	Hold Your Hand; Debbie Take Control Of The Stereo; Jackie From The Estate; Dead In My Head; Top Of The Pop Chart; Sandra Dee; Power ON The MUSIC; No 1 Star; Leader Of The Band; Wear Your Hair Long; On My Own; Summer POP	Alcopop!		
2022	This is my World	My Seaside Town Billy Liar; Go-Kart; A Quite Good Time; Let The Sunshine In; Our House; First Day of June; The Social Club; Clearing Out Mum's House; This Is My World	Alcopop!		

=== Singles ===
Year	Single	B-side	Label	Cat. no.	Format/Notes
1993	Formula One Racing Girls	Riding Hi	Damaged Goods	DAMGOOD18	7" only - 500 pink, black, then 250 red (reissue)
1993	Joey Ramoney	Greatest Fan	Damaged Goods	DAMGOOD27	7" only 500 green vinyl
1993	Happiest Time of the Year	Where's Me F*cking Presents (by Wat Tyler)	Damaged Goods	DAMPUD33 1/3	split single; 7" greeny vinyl only
1994	Punk Boy	Punk Boy 2	Damaged Goods	DAMGOOD38	7" only 500 pale blue, then black vinyl
1995	Bubblegum	Let's Go	Damaged Goods	DAMGOOD61	7" 500 pink, then black vinyl
1995	Ahead of the Race	Diet Coke Girl	Damaged Goods	DAMGOOD80	CD + 7" 500 white, then black vinyl
1995	Beat Him Up	Super Boy Super Girl + Matthew Kaplan Superstar (cd only)	Damaged Goods	DAMGOOD89	CD + 7" 500 pale blue, then black vinyl
1995	We Love You	Girl about town + We Love You (2) + Punk Boy	Damaged Goods	DAMGOOD95	CD + 7" white + orange vinyl
1997	Does Your Heart Go Boom	So in Love with You + Yeah Yeah We're Helen Love + Put Yr Foot on the Fuzzbox Baby	Ché Trading	CHE72	CD + 7" bubblegum pink vinyl, UK No. 71
1998	Long Live the UK Music Scene	Sunburst Super Kay + Great in Formula One	Ché Trading	CHE82	CD + 7", UK No. 65
2000	Shifty Disco Girl	King of Kung Fu + Leader of the Pack	Ché Trading	CHE89	CD + 7"
2000	Jump Up and Down; Atomic Beat Boy	Big Pink Candyfloss Haircut	Ché Trading	CHE90	CD + 7" - double A-side
2001	Merry Christmas (I Don't Wanna Fight)		Damaged Goods	DAMGOOD206	One-sided 7" only. A cover of a Ramones song.
2004	Debbie Loves Joey				Free download from helenlove.com
2005	Long Hot Summer	Long Hot Summer 2 Helen Love on 45 (a medley of Helen Love hits)	Invicta Hi-Fi	LIQ029	CD + translucent orange 7"
2006	Junk Shop Discothèque	Debbie Loves Joey (Kid Karate remix); Shut Your Mouth	Elefant Records	ER-249 (vinyl); ER-363 (cd)	CD + baby pink 7" + Download
2007	It's My Club	Boots On + Jennifer Hanley	Elefant Records	ER-370	CD + Download
2009	Calm Down Dad	John Peel Roadshow + Candeelips	Elefant Records	ER-267	Orange 7" + Download
2012	And The Salvation Army Band Plays	And The Salvation Army Band Plays (Disco Mix)	Damaged Goods	DAMGOOD410	7" + Download. With Ricardo Autobahn
2013	New Boy In Town	Television Generation	Damaged Goods	DAMGOOD423	7" Picture Disc
2013	Atomic	A Giant Kiss + Judy Don't Dance	Elefant Records	ER-D028	Download
2013	Hark The Herald Angels Sing		Elefant Records	ER-D034	Free download from elefant.com
2014	Pogo Pogo	Make Up, Break Up + Red Light + Julie's Got A New 7 Inch Single	Elefant Records	ER-328	Red 7" + Download
2014	Pogo Pogo (Ricardo Autobahn Italo Disco Remix)		Elefant Records	ER-D047	Free download from elefant.com
2014	Where Dylan Thomas Talks To Me		Elefant Records	ER-D051	Free download from elefant.com
2015	You Can't Beat a Boy Who Loves the Ramones	You Can't Beat a Boy Who Loves the Ramones (Ricardo Autobahn 80s Remix)	POST/POP Records	PXP035 (Cassette)	Cassette + Download
2015	The Townhall Band		Alcopop! Records		Download
2016	A Boy From Wales Called Gareth Bale		Alcopop! Records		Download
2018	Double Denim		Alcopop! Records		Square clear 7"

=== EPs ===
Year	Title	Tracks	Label	Cat. no.	Format/Notes
1994	Summer Pop Punk Pop EP	Love; Kiss; Run; Sing; Shout; Jump! Rollercoasting; Rockaway Beach for Me, Heartbreak Hotel For You; Summer Pop Radio; So Hot; Golden Summer	Damaged Goods	DAMGOOD42	10" only 500 pink vinyl
2000	[Helen Love vs The Cuban Boys] Does Your Heart Go Boom remixes	"Emma Peel" "Tea Leoni" "John Peel" "Juliette Binoche"	Ché Trading	CHE88	one-sided 12" only.
2005	The Bubblegum Killers EP	Debbie Loves Joey; Saturday Night Kicks; A Boy Like You; Better Pop Your Bubblegum [cd only] (The Continuing Adventures of) The Girl About Town wigwambam [cd only]	Sympathy for the Record Industry	SFTRI751	CD + bubblegum pink 7"

=== Compilations ===
Year	Title	Tracks	Label	Cat. no.	Format/Notes
1994	Radio Hits	Formula One Racing Girls; Riding Hi; Joey Ramoney; Greatest Fan; Punk Boy 1 Punk Boy 2 Love; Kiss; Run; Sing; Shout; Jump! Rollercoasting; Rockaway Beach for Me, Heartbreak Hotel For You; Summer Pop Radio; So Hot; Golden Summer	Damaged Goods	DAMGOOD51	CD and 1000 yellow glitter vinyl Compilation of the first three singles and the Summer Pop Punk Pop EP
1997	Radio Hits 2	Bubblegum; Let's Go; Ahead of the Race; Diet Coke Girl; Beat Him Up; Super Boy Super Girl; Matthew Kaplan Superstar; Il Fait Beau (unlisted on LP sleeve/label); We Love You; Girl About Town; We Love You (2)	Damaged Goods	DAMGOOD117	CD and 1000 green glitter vinyl Compilation of the four 1995 singles, plus one previously unreleased track
2002	Radio Hits 3	Does Your Heart Go Boom; So In Love With You; Yeah Yeah We're Helen Love; Put Your Foot on the Fuzzbox, Baby; Long Live The UK Music Scene; Sunburst Super Kay; Great in Formula One; Shifty Disco Girl; King of Kung Fu; Leader of the Pack; Jump Up and Down; Atomic Beat Boy; Big Pink Candyfloss Haircut; Does Your Heart Go Boom (Cuban Boys "Emma Peel" Remix); Number One Fantastic Day	Damaged Goods	DAMGOOD203	CD + LP; Compilation of the Ché singles
