= 2004 in Irish music =

A summary of the year 2004 in the Irish music industry.

== Summary ==
=== March ===
- Tickets for Oxegen 2004, the festival that would in years to come be a worthy successor to Witnness, went on sale on Friday 5 March. One-day tickets cost €59.50, two-day tickets were priced at €110.00 whilst a two-day ticket with camping included cost €130.00.

=== June ===
- On Friday 11 June tickets for Dido's August performance at Marlay Park in Dublin, supported by Scissor Sisters, went on sale priced at €55.
- On Saturday 12 June Red Hot Chili Peppers played Phoenix Park, supported by The Thrills, The Pixies, Groove Armada and Hothouse Flowers. It was their fourth consecutive year to appear in Ireland.
- On 25 June tickets for The White Stripes two August shows in Dublin's Marlay Park and the Belfast Botanic Gardens went on sale.
- On Wednesday 30 June it was announced that David Bowie would be unable to headline his scheduled slot on the Sunday night of Oxegen 2004.

=== July ===
- Oxegen 2004 took place on Saturday 10 and Sunday 11 July, headlined by The Darkness, The Strokes and The Cure. It was the natural successor to Witnness and like the previous year's festival was held at Punchestown Racecourse, County Kildare. It was the first of two new festivals this year that would leave a permanent mark on the Irish music scene in later years.

=== August ===
- On 24 August The White Stripes played Marlay Park in Dublin. On 25 August they played Belfast's Botanic Gardens. They were supported at both shows by New York Dolls.
- On 25 August Dido played Marlay Park in Dublin with support from Scissor Sisters.
- The first Electric Picnic was held at Stradbally, County Laois. Beginning as a one-day event, it was soon to become an international hit, and it wasn't long before it was catching up on Oxegen in popularity. Its patrons praised it for its unique atmosphere and, although it didn't attract the same internationally recognised acts as Oxegen, it became very much a fixture in later years.

=== November ===
- 19 November saw the Irish release of the internationally anticipated eleventh studio album by U2. How to Dismantle an Atomic Bomb debuted at #1 in 34 countries and worldwide sales as of 2006 number close to 10 million copies sold. The album was preceded by the lead single "Vertigo", released for radio airplay on 24 September, when it received extensive airplay and topped the charts in several countries when it was released on 8 November.

=== December ===
- On 1 December Foo Fighters were confirmed as the Sunday night headliner for Oxegen 2005.
- On 10 December The Prodigy were confirmed for Oxegen 2005.

== Bands formed ==
- The Chakras
- Dark Room Notes
- The Flaws
- Glyder
- Lluther
- Travega (January)
- Triega (July)

== Bands disbanded ==
- Moloko

== Bands reformed ==
- Planxty
- The Radiators from Space (as The Radiators (Plan 9))

== Albums & EPs ==
Below is a list of notable albums & EPs released by Irish artists in Ireland in 2004.

- Absent Friends – The Divine Comedy (29 March 2004)
- Meltdown – Ash (17 May 2004)
- Kindness – The Radio (August 2004)
- Let's Bottle Bohemia – The Thrills (13 September 2004)
- Burn the Maps – The Frames (17 September 2004)
- Bavarian EP – The Divine Comedy (25 October 2004) – (EP downloadable from official website)
- How to Dismantle an Atomic Bomb – U2 (19 November 2004)

Unknown

- Nightrock – The Chalets (2004) – (EP)
- Something Ilk – Cathy Davey (2004)
- Listening In: Radio Sessions 1978-1982 (Live) – The Undertones (2004)

== Singles ==
Below is a list of notable singles released by Irish artists in Ireland in 2004.

Issue date	Song title	Artist	Source	Sales	Notes
24 February	"Clones"	Ash			
22 March	"Come Home Billy Bird"	The Divine Comedy			
12 April	"Chocolate"	Snow Patrol			
3 May	"Orpheus"	Ash			
14 June	"Absent Friends"	The Divine Comedy			
19 June	"Starcrossed"	Ash			
20 August	"Finally"	The Frames			
25 October	"How to Be Dead"	Snow Patrol			
8 November	"Vertigo"	U2			
__ December	"Renegade Cavalcade"	Ash			

Date unknown

- "Whatever Happened to Corey Haim?" – The Thrills (??? 2004)
- "Not for All the Love in the World" – The Thrills (??? 2004)

== Festivals ==
=== Oxegen 2004 ===
- Oxegen 2004 took place at Punchestown Racecourse in County Kildare on Saturday 9 July and Sunday 11 July. It was headlined by The Darkness, The Cure and The Strokes, whilst Kings of Leon, PJ Harvey, The Divine Comedy, The Libertines, Franz Ferdinand, Scissor Sisters, Muse, Faithless, Massive Attack, Basement Jaxx and Chemical Brothers also appeared.

=== Electric Picnic 2004 ===
- Electric Picnic 2004 took place in Stradbally Estate, County Laois. It was headlined by Groove Armada, Super Furry Animals, Jurassic 5, David Kitt, Mylo and Erol Alkan.

=== Heineken Green Energy ===
- Heineken Green Energy took place for the 9th year in 2004, featuring The Streets and The Stooges.

=== Slane 2004 ===
- Slane 2004 was headlined by Madonna, supported by Paul Oakenfold and Iggy Pop and the Stooges.

== Music awards ==
=== 2004 Meteor Awards ===
The 2004 Meteor Awards were held on ???, 2004. Below are the winners:

Award	Winner(s)
Best Irish Male	Paddy Casey
Best Irish Female	Cara Dillon
Best Irish Band	The Frames
Best Irish Album	So Much for the City (The Thrills)
Best New Irish Act	Future Kings of Spain
Best Irish Pop Act	Westlife
Best Live Performance	Red Hot Chili Peppers (Slane 2003)
Best Irish DJ	Ryan Tubridy
Hope for 2004	Republic of Loose
Best Folk/Traditional	Damien Dempsey
Best International Male	Justin Timberlake
Best International Female	Beyoncé Knowles
Best International Band	The Darkness
Best International Album	Elephant (The White Stripes)
Industry Award	Dave Fanning
Lifetime Achievement Award	The Dubliners
Humanitarian Award	Stanislaus Kennedy (Sister Stan)

=== Choice Music Prize ===
The Choice Music Prize did not exist this year.
