= Kablammo! =

Studio album by Ash
- Released: 25 May 2015
- Recorded: December 2014 – February 2015
- Studio: Atomic Heart, British Grove
- Genre: Pop rock, power pop
- Length: 39:49
- Label: Earmusic
- Producer: Ash, Claudius Mittendorfer

Ash chronology
The Best of Ash (2011)	Kablammo! (2015)	Islands (2018)

Singles from Kablammo!
- 1. "Cocoon" Released: 18 February 2015; 2. "Machinery" Released: 9 October 2015

Kablammo! is the sixth studio album by Northern Irish rock band Ash. It was released on 25 May 2015, through Earmusic. During 2009 and 2010, the band released a collection of singles as part of the A–Z Series; in the years following, frontman Tim Wheeler re-thought his stance on albums. Between December 2014 and February 2015, the band recorded their next album at Atomic Heart Studios in New York City, with them and Claudius Mittendorfer co-producing the sessions. Described as a pop rock and power pop release, Kablammo! attempted to capture the live sound of the band.

Preceded by lead single "Cocoon" in February 2015, the band promoted Kablammo! with in-store acoustic performances. Over the next few months, they toured the United Kingdom and the United States, played a few festivals, and released music videos for "Free", "Evel Knievel" and "Machinery". "Machinery" was released as the second single in October, and was followed by a music video for "Cocoon", which coincided with a UK tour. In 2016, the band toured Australia, released "Machinery" and "Cocoon" as part of a Record Store Day 7" vinyl release, and appeared at the 2000 Trees Festival.

Kablammo! received generally positive reviews from music critics, some of whom commented on its upbeat energy. The album peaked at number 27 in Ireland, and number 41 in the UK.

== Background and production ==
Ash released their fifth studio album, Twilight of the Innocents, in July 2007. Before its release, the band viewed it as their last album, with frontman Tim Wheeler explaining that he was consuming music the way other people were at the time, through playlists and individual tracks. In 2009, they began releasing a collection of singles, under the name of the A–Z Series, which were followed by two compilation albums of the tracks in 2010. Drummer Rick McMurray said the even though their fans enjoyed the series, record labels had no interest it; he mentioned that as they had spent more money on recording the series, they found it difficult to promote. By the end of the series, Wheeler was feeling burnt out, and was looking for another challenge the band could take on. He decided to make a Christmas album with his girlfriend Emmy the Great, and did some soundtrack work.

In November 2011, the band released their second best-of album, The Best of Ash, which was promoted with a brief United Kingdom tour with former guitarist Charlotte Hatherley. The following month, Wheeler said he was beginning to re-think his stance on the album format. To coincide with the band's 20th anniversary in 2012, they released the Little Infinity EP. Over the next two years, the band played shows and festivals across the UK and the United States, a celebratory tour for their debut studio album 1977 (1996) in Australia, and Wheeler released a solo album, Lost Domain (2014). Around this time, Wheeler was witnessing the vinyl revival, and buying records again, in order to gain "the essence of what an album was again."

Wheeler got into the habit of writing multiple songs per day, as many as seven or eight, for up to 12 hour long writing sessions. The attempts were fruitful, resulting in eight tracks that would feature on their next album. Kablammo! was recorded at Atomic Heart Studios in New York City, with Ash and Claudius Mittendorfer co-producing the sessions; Mittendorfer also acted as the engineer. The album was financed by their fans through the crowdfunding platform PledgeMusic in December 2014, and completed by February 2015. 18 songs were recorded in total out of a selection of 40. Strings were recorded by Martin Hollis, with assistance from Andy Cook, at British Grove Studios in London. Mittendorfer mixed the recordings, before they were mastered by John Davis at Metropolis.

== Composition ==
Musically, the sound of Kablammo! has been described as pop rock, and power pop. The album's title Kablammo! comes from a drum sample that the band was sent from a friend of theirs; McMurray said Wheeler felt this was a good name as they wanted "something fun" to contrast Twilight of the Innocents. Wheeler wrote all of the songs, except for "Dispatch" which he co-wrote with bassist Mark Hamilton. McMurray said they attempted to "capture the live essence" of the band, adding that Meltdown (2004) was the "closest sonic predecessor", crossed with the writing of the singles from Free All Angels (2001). He also said they removed the electronic textures of the A–Z Series, in favour of a "streamlined, blazing guitar record."

For the lyrical themes, Wheeler said he re-listened to 1977 and Free All Angels to evoke nostalgia: "So there’s a lot of summer and referring back to our crazy days on tour when we were kids". He added that it was an intentional upbeat contrast to the dark nature of Alzheimer's disease that he wrote about on Lost Domain. Two years prior, Wheeler got into Muay Thai kickboxing, which he said was alluded to in the album's title, and had influenced some of the songs. He wrote some of the tracks on a ukulele, which he felt showcased their simplicity. Wheeler mentioned that the Australian trek for 1977 influenced Kablammo!, as they wanted an album that could work well in a live setting. Strings were arranged by Ilan Eshkeri, conducted by Andy Brown, and performed by the London Metropolitan Orchestra.

Kablammo! opens with two power pop tracks, "Cocoon" and "Let's Ride". The latter sees AC/DC-like guitar riffs being played over a Freddie Mercury-styled chorus section. "Machinery" comes across as a mix of Brian Wilson and Rivers Cuomo, and is followed by the slow-building pop song "Free". With the former, Wheeler attempted the song as if "someone from the 90s to have just passed out for 20 years and woke up today". "Go! Fight! Win" features cheerleader chants from Leanne Macoomber, Laura Mittendorfer, and Danielle Johnson.

"Moondust" is a piano-and-strings ballad that comes across as a mix between James Bond theme songs and "Don't Stop Believin'" (1981) by Journey. "Evel Knievel" is an instrumental surf song, which features dialogue from the film Evel Knievel (1971), and is followed by the Killers-tinged "Hedonism". "Dispatch" was compared to "Stay Together for the Kids" (2001) by Blink-182, and features an Iron Maiden-indebted guitar solo; it is followed by the power pop song "Shutdown". Penultimate track "For Eternity" is a piano ballad that is followed by the closer, "Bring Back the Summer", an electropop song with synthesizers and drum machines.

== Release ==
"Cocoon" was released as the lead single on 18 February 2015; it was released on cassette on 28 March. On 1 April, Kablammo! was announced for release the following month, with its track listing being posted online. Kablammo! was released on 25 May, through Earmusic, and was promoted with a few in-store acoustic performances. The following month, the band went a short UK tour in June, and an appearance at the Long Division Festival. On 17 June, a music video was released for "Free", directed by Mat Whitecross; it shows the band performing inside of an insane asylum. In August and September, the band performed at the Bingley Music Live, Y Not, and Reading and Leeds Festivals. Music videos were released for "Evel Knievel" and "Machinery" on 18 August and 23 September, respectively.

On 7 September 2015, the band released the Kablammo! Acoustic EP, which featured acoustic versions of some of the tracks. The band then went on a tour of the United States, which continued into October. On 9 October, "Machinery" was released as a single. On 1 December, a music video was released for "Cocoon". Later in the month, the band toured the UK, with support from Asylums. In March 2016, the band embarked on a tour of Australia. The following month, "Machinery" and "Cocoon" were released as a 7" vinyl as part of Record Store Day. In June, the band appeared at the 2000 Trees Festival. "Cocoon" and "Machinery" were included on the band's third compilation album Teenage Wildlife: 25 Years of Ash (2020).

== Reception ==
Professional ratings
Aggregate scores
Source	Rating
Metacritic	76/100
Review scores
Source	Rating
AllMusic	3.5/5 stars
Alternative Press	4.5/5 stars
Classic Rock	Favourable
Drowned in Sound	6/10
Evening Standard	3/5 stars
Exclaim!	6/10
Louder Than War	8/10
The Music	3.5/5 stars
musicOMH	4/5 stars
PopMatters	7/10 stars

Kablammo! was met with generally positive reviews from music critics. At Metacritic, the album received an average score of 76, based on 11 reviews.

Alternative Press writer Annie Zaleski said that "as its name implies, Kablammo! is exuberant and energetic," adding that it "even succeeds when it puts the brakes on fuzz and speed". Joe Whyte of Louder Than War wrote that all of Ash's typical trademarks "are present and correct. Summery, slicing power-punk gusto, Laurel Canyon meets The Ramones harmonies and string-bedecked pop nuggets frame Tim Wheeler’s lovelorn lyrics." He complimented the production for "benefit[ting] Ash; they sound leaner, hungrier and quite frankly, burn like they’re having a whale of a good time." Classic Rock's Michael Koehler wrote that the album can be "paraphrased with a full set of adjectives that read: dynamic, powerful, energetic, fresh, young, fiery, present and gifted ingenious." musicOMH contributor Graeme Marsh saw it as a "mixed bag [of styles], but this is no mixed bag quality wise. ... [T]his album provides ample proof that Ash’s embers still fizzle away and look likely so to do for some time yet." AllMusic reviewer Stephen Thomas Erlewine wrote that it was "nicely paced, bursting out of the gates with big hooks and thunder beats, finding space to breathe ... ending with a pair of bittersweet elegies."

PopMatters writer Matt James called it "pretty much a triumph ... clearly prov[ing] that, despite the passing of time, Ash can still kick ass." He added that it was "[t]hankfully more rebirth than retread". The Music's Mac McNaughton wrote that the band "refocused and delivering what they always did best: an album full of rambunctious songs that could be singles." Lisa Sookraj of Exclaim! wrote that the album "feels more like driving across the prairies than a trek across the mountainous peaks of their earlier work." She explained that the band "still generate radio-friendly tunes", though they "lack the depth that they demonstrated at their peak," coming across as a re-hash of their older material. Evening Standard reviewer John Aizlewood said it was the band "at their most powerful and concise", with Wheeler having "never lost the knack of penning a short, sharp punk anthem[s]". Drowned in Sound writer Paul Brown said that while the album offers " enough to justify its existence within Ash’s powerful back catalogue, it really does feel like it tails off towards the end."

Kablammo! charted at number 27 in Ireland, and number 41 in the UK.

== Track listing ==
All songs written by Tim Wheeler, except where noted.

No.	Title	Writer(s)	Length
1.	"Cocoon"		2:27
2.	"Let's Ride"		2:51
3.	"Machinery"		3:58
4.	"Free"		3:57
5.	"Go! Fight! Win!"		3:58
6.	"Moondust"		4:04
7.	"Evel Knievel" (instrumental)		1:45
8.	"Hedonism"		3:39
9.	"Dispatch"	Mark Hamilton, Wheeler	3:55
10.	"Shutdown"		2:19
11.	"For Eternity"		4:10
12.	"Bring Back the Summer"		2:46

Deluxe edition disc 2
No.	Title	Writer(s)	Length
13.	"Juvenilia"		3:40
14.	"Terraform"	Hamilton	3:22
15.	"This Time Tomorrow" (The Kinks cover)	Ray Davies	3:12
16.	"Anything Is Possible"		3:04

== Personnel ==
Personnel per booklet.

Ash

- Tim Wheeler – vocals, guitars, piano, keyboards
- Mark Hamilton – bass
- Rick McMurray – drums, percussion

Additional musicians

- Leanne Macoomber – cheerleader (track 5)
- Laura Mittendorfer – cheerleader (track 5)
- Danielle Johnson – cheerleader (track 5)
- Ilan Eshkeri – string arrangement
- London Metropolitan Orchestra – strings
- Andy Brown – conductor

Production

- Ash – producer
- Claudius Mittendorfer – producer, engineer, mixing
- Martin Hollis – recording
- Andy Cook – assistant
- John Davis – mastering
- Pedro Inoue – art direction, illustrations
- Alex Lake – photography

== Charts ==
Chart (2015)	Peak position
Irish Albums (IRMA)	27
UK Albums (OCC)	41
