= End of the World (Ash song) =

Single by Ash

from the album Twilight of the Innocents
- Released: 10 September 2007
- Recorded: 2007
- Genre: Alternative rock
- Length: 4:20
- Label: Infectious Records
- Songwriter: Tim Wheeler
- Producer: Tim Wheeler

Ash singles chronology
"Polaris" (2007)	"End of the World" (2007)	"Return of White Rabbit" (2009)

"End of the World" is the third single released from alternative rock band Ash's album, Twilight of the Innocents. It was released on 10 September 2007 on gatefold 7" vinyl, bagged 7", CD single and two digital download formats. It charted at a lowly No.62 in the UK Charts, becoming their first single to miss the top 40 since "Kung Fu" in 1995.

A music video was shot in Tokyo, photos were uploaded by the videos director.

The single is the last Ash release Charlotte Hatherley would have contributed to, despite having left the band a year prior to the single's release. She is credited to providing guitar, Fender Rhodes, and backing vocal parts for the track "Seventh Circle". The track was recorded during sessions for the Meltdown album, and was held over because it didn't fit the album's motif. The song was previously tentatively named "Singapore Song" as it was written while the band were touring Free All Angels in Singapore.

"Statis in Darkness" is a leftover b-side from Free All Angels.

== Track listing ==
CD

1. "End of the World" - 4:23
2. "Seventh Circle" - 5:10
3. "Wasted on You" - 2:57
4. "Statis in Darkness" - 4:13

7" - Gatefold

1. "End of the World"
2. "Shattered Glass (Demo)"

7" - Bag

1. "End of the World"
2. "Suicide Girls"

Download EP - iTunes

1. "End of the World (Acoustic)" - 4:02
2. "End of the World (Demo)" - 3:06

Download EP - Xfm Live EP

1. "End of the World (Live)" - 4:15
2. "Girl From Mars (Live)" - 3:06
3. "Burn Baby Burn (Live)" - 3:27
4. "Twilight of the Innocents (Live)" - 6:41
