= Islands (Ash album) =

Studio album by Ash
- Released: 18 May 2018
- Studios: Atom Heart, New York City
- Genre: Power pop
- Length: 50:00
- Labels: Infectious, BMG
- Producers: Tim Wheeler; Mark Hamilton; Rick McMurray; Claudius Mittendorfer

Ash chronology
Kablammo! (2015)	Islands (2018)	Race the Night (2023)

Singles from Islands
- 1. "Buzzkill" Released: 8 February 2018; 2. "Annabel" Released: 10 April 2018; 3. "Confessions in the Pool" Released: 11 May 2018

Islands is the seventh studio album by Northern Irish rock band Ash. It was released on 18 May 2018, through Infectious Music and BMG. Following the touring cycle for their previous album Kablammo! (2015), frontman Tim Wheeler was going through a break-up, and travelled around the world in attempt to isolate himself. While traveling, he wrote multiple songs in each location. Ash reconvened and began recording their next album at Atom Heart Studios in New York City, with Wheeler acting as the main producer. Described as a power pop album, Islands drew comparison to the Beach Boys, the Ramones, and the Undertones.

"Buzzkill" was released as the lead single in February 2018, followed by the second and third singles "Annabel" and "Confessions in the Pool" in April and May, respectively. In the first few months of the album's release, the band appeared at a few festivals, toured the United States, the United Kingdom, Australia, and Ireland. They performed at two festivals in 2019. Islands received generally positive reviews from music critics, some of whom commented on its catchy nature, and others commenting on Wheeler's lyricism. The album peaked at number 12 in Scotland, number 18 in the UK, and number 34 in Ireland.

== Background and production ==
Ash released their sixth studio album, Kablammo!, in May 2015. The album was promoted with tours of the United Kingdom, the United States, and Australia, and appeared at 2000 Trees Festival in mid 2016. Prior to the Australian trek, the band met up in a studio to work on some tracks that Wheeler had written in the preceding year. After the end of the touring cycle, frontman Tim Wheeler went through a break-up, and in an attempt to isolate himself, he travelled around the world. He visited the Japanese islands Naoshima and Teshima, before going to Deià in Majorca, Spain, Santorini, near Greece, Lambay, Ireland, and ending at his home in New York City. While in each location, he took to writing 10 songs in 10 hours. Between September and December 2016, the band went on a celebratory 20th anniversary tour for their debut studio 1977 (1996), touring the US, Europe, and the UK.

During the trek, Wheeler said Ash had been writing material for their next album, which they aimed to release in the following year. He wanted to make two albums and release them within relatively quick succession, in an attempt to avoid having to wait at least three years in between albums. Islands was recorded at Atom Heart Studios in New York City, with Wheeler acting as producer. Bassist Mark Hamilton, drummer Rick McMurray, and Claudius Mittendorfer were given co-producer roles. Wheeler and Mittendorfer acted as engineers, with the latter mixing the recordings. McMurray lived in Edinburgh, Scotland while Hamilton and Wheeler lived in New York City; Wheel said this meant that McMurrary would visited them "for a week or so a time and we work quite intensely". When the drum parts were completed, there was a "lot of work to be done on finishing the tracks afterwards", which McMurrary did not need to be present for. John O'Neil engineered backing vocals on "Buzzkill". John Davis mastered the album at Metropolis.

== Composition and lyrics ==
Musically, the sound of Islands has been described as power pop, drawing comparison to the Beach Boys, the Ramones, and the Undertones. Wheeler titled it Islands after he spent the aftermath of a break-up traveling the world. The album opens with the National and Arcade Fire-indebted "True Story". "Annabel" evokes the band's earlier material; Wheeler wrote "Buzzkill" as a joke in an attempt to get his friends to laugh. He said it was "so fun, dumb and full of unnecessary swearing", and attributed its title to the Belfast band of the same name. Wheeler had watched the Undertones play shows twice before, and realised how much the backing vocals for the track emulated their style. He met two of their members, Damian O'Neill and Michael Bradley, at a charity show; they subsequently contributed backing vocals to the song. The track discussed recovering from a break-up, while also being frequently reminded of situations that can affect one's buzz. Wheeler attributed some of the production work on "Confessions in the Pool" to what they had learned when making "White Rabbit" and "Arcadia" for the A–Z Series (2009–2010) project.

"Confessions in the Pool" features Strangles-esque keyboard work, while its verses recalled the work of James, and is followed by the arena rock song "All That I Have Left". The surf rock track "Don't Need Your Love" channelled latter-day Weezer, and featured a 1970s guitar solo. The power pop song "Somersault" harkened back the band's early releases, such as Trailer (1994) and 1977 (1996). "Did Your Love Burn Out?" was stylised after 1920s Ennio Morricone funeral music, and opens with a part that was reminiscent of the Animals' version of "The House of the Rising Sun". Wheeler said it evolved out of "guitar figures, the vocal melodies were following the guitar melodies I had written. [...] when I got the upbeat funk part I wanted to go there to keep it interesting". "Silver Suit" was compared to Weezer (2001)-era Weezer, and is followed by the slow-building "It's a Trap", which channelled the Arctic Monkeys. The intro to "Is It True?" was reminiscent of the work of Maxïmo Park; the album ends with the post-rock track "Incoming Waves". The latter was influenced by the graveyard where Robert Graves was buried in Deià. The hidden track "Easy Girl" is a bossa nova organ-led song.

== Release ==
In July 2017, Wheeler said Ash were in the midst of working out a new record deal; they eventually re-signed with their former label Infectious Music. On 7 February 2018, Islands was announced for release in a few months' time, with its artwork and track listing being revealed. "Buzzkill" was released as a single the following day. "Annabel" was released as a single on 10 April; its music video was released the following month. The video was directed by Luc Janin and features skateboarder Clement Vannini, who was born without a right leg. It was filmed over the course of three days and was shot in Vannini's garden. The band said he "perfectly embodied the spirt of the song; facing your fears and tackling them head on".

In early May, the band performed at Live at Leeds and Teddy Rocks festivals. "Confessions in the Pool" was released as a single on 11 May. Islands was released on 18 May 2018, through Infectious Music and BMG. The artwork depicts an upside-down black and white photo of Skellig Michael. The Japanese version contains two bonus tracks, "Easy Girl" and "Rock N Roll Requires Repetition".

Following this, the band appeared at the BBC Biggest Weekend (in Ireland) and Baby's All Right (in the United States) festivals. In August, the band played a few UK festivals, before embarking on a brief US tour in September, which was then followed by a UK tour in October. On 4 September, a music video was released for "Confessions in the Pool"; the band said it was "surreal play" on its title, taking the "Confessions idea and runs with it so far it becomes surreal meditation on belief and salvation in the modern age." In November, the band toured Australia, and closed the year with three Ireland dates. In July and August 2019, the band appeared at the Splendour in Nottingham and Victorious Festivals.

== Critical reception ==
Professional ratings
Aggregate scores
Source	Rating
AnyDecentMusic?	6.5/10
Metacritic	73/100
Review scores
Source	Rating
AllMusic	3/5 stars
Classic Rock	4/5 stars
Drowned in Sound	8/10
God Is in the TV	Favourable
Louder Than War	7/10
MusicOMH	3.5/5 stars
NME	4/5 stars
PopMatters	Favourable
RTÉ	4/5 stars
Under the Radar	7/10 stars

Islands received generally favorable reviews from critics. At Metacritic, which assigns a normalized rating out of 100 to reviews from mainstream publications, the album received an average score of 73 based on 9 reviews. Similarly, AnyDecentMusic? gave it a score of 6.5 based on 11 reviews.

Drowned in Sound reviewer Marc Burrows called Islands "unmistakably, from the very first note, a new Ash album" that was Ash's "most consistently enjoyable full-length record since Free All Angels." He liked Wheeler's "knack for an earworm", which often "deliver[ed] three or four velcro hooks per-song". Classic Rock writer John Aizlewood said the album finds the band "in rude health, rediscovering and building upon what made them so appealing, while taking themselves to new places entirely. Islands is the sound of Ash’s liberation." RTÉ's Alan Corr wrote that the music was pushing the same "cylinders as their earlier, more immediate work." He overall called the release "[a]nother fine album ... Islands is a fizzy sugar bomb of great tunes primed for an endless summer."

In a review for NME, Mark Beaumont said the album was "as ferocious and catchy as ever. And while it’s undoubtedly a record of consolidation, a return to familiar home ground, it also gently scouts new territory." PopMatters contributor John Garratt wrote that the album was "every bit as consistent as Kablammo!," despite it being "just a tad less fun in spots." He added that he was confused as to why the band hadn't surpassed their peers, such as Green Day and Weezer, before "remind[ing] myself that Ash had to crawl their way out of Downpatrick, Ireland first ... And by that yardstick, they've done more than pretty well for themselves." Andy Page of God Is in the TV said that the "majority of the tracks sound like instant singles, it’s a very immediate record." He liked Wheeler's lyrics for "somehow ... managing to pull euphoric words and melodies" from his break-up.

Under the Radar's Stephen Mayne viewed Islands as "cool, catchy, and a whole lot of fun", with Ash being "back on form." He noted "an aching sadness" in a few of Wheeler's lyrics as "the passage of time comes to weigh heavily on a group no longer young." Louder Than War writer Sam Lambeth said the album was "very much business as usual", though "even a band as free-spirited as Ash are not invulnerable to age, and Islands does show off their more mature side." Graeme Marsh of musicOMH noted that "Islands takes the foot off the gas a little." He explained that with Wheeler's break-up, the "result is less of an immediate adrenaline rush like they’ve often put forward in the past." AllMusic reviewer Stephen Thomas Erlewine also noted the tempo shift: "Everybody's pace slows once they leave their twenties, so the general deliberateness that characterizes 2018's Islands ... isn't a surprise, but the trio is otherwise light on their feet."

== Commercial performance ==
Islands peaked at number 12 in Scotland, number 18 in the UK, and number 34 in Ireland.

== Track listing ==
All songs written by Tim Wheeler.

Islands track listing
No.	Title	Length
1.	"True Story"	3:20
2.	"Annabel"	3:12
3.	"Buzzkill"	2:30
4.	"Confessions in the Pool"	4:23
5.	"All That I Have Left"	3:32
6.	"Don't Need Your Love"	3:55
7.	"Somersault"	3:05
8.	"Did Your Love Burn Out?"	4:35
9.	"Silver Suit"	4:13
10.	"It's a Trap"	4:27
11.	"Is It True?"	4:02
12.	"Incoming Waves" (includes hidden track "Easy Girl"; not on all versions)	8:46
Total length:		50:00

== Personnel ==
Personnel per booklet.

Ash

- Tim Wheeler – vocals, guitars, keyboards, handclaps (tracks 3 and 7)
- Mark Hamilton – bass
- Rick McMurray – drums, percussion

Additional musicians

- Michael Bradley – backing vocals (track 3)
- Damian O'Neill – backing vocals (track 3)
- Ilan Eshkeri – mellotron (track 6)
- Pat Wheeler – handclaps (tracks 3 and 7)
- Mark Arigho – handclaps (tracks 3 and 7)
- Claudius Mittendorfer – handclaps (tracks 3 and 7)

Production

- Tim Wheeler – producer, engineer, photos
- Mark Hamilton – co-producer
- Rick McMurray – co-producer
- Claudius Mittendorfer – co-producer, engineer, mixing
- John Davis – mastering
- John O'Neill – engineer
- Pedro Inoue – design
- Alex John Beck – band photography

== Charts ==
Chart performance for Islands
Chart (2018)	Peak position
Irish Albums (IRMA)	34
Scottish Albums (Official Charts)	13
UK Albums (Official Charts)	18
