= Starcrossed (song) =

2004 single by Ash

Single by Ash

from the album Meltdown
- B-side: "Solace", "Cool It Down"
- Released: 19 July 2004
- Genre: Alternative rock
- Length: 4:52
- Label: Infectious
- Songwriter(s): Tim Wheeler
- Producer(s): Nick Raskulinecz

Ash singles chronology
| "Orpheus" (2004) | "Starcrossed" (2004) | "Renegade Cavalcade" (2004) |

"Starcrossed" is the third single from the Meltdown album by the band Ash. It was released as a single on 19 July 2004 as a CD and a gatefold 7-inch vinyl, as well as a DVD format and various promo copies. "Starcrossed" was A-listed on BBC Radio 1 and peaked at number 22 on the UK Singles Chart and number 43 in Ireland. However, the song was successful in the long run for the band and is considered one of their most popular songs.

== Description ==
"Starcrossed" is Meltdown's only slow paced song, and is a power ballad "based on 'Romeo & Juliet'. I've always loved that grouping of words that Shakespeare did". (Tim, 2004). Mark has described it as: "Star-crossed - It's the big power ballad, with Tim singing about 2 lovers who are in no uncertain terms 'fucked'". The track is unusual for the band in many ways. One of the most notable ways is the fact that all the guitar work is handled by Wheeler in this video, while Hatherley handles piano duties.

The track was played at every concert on the "Meltdown" tour, but has yet to appear on the tour accompanying Ash's latest album, "Twilight of the Innocents".

== B-sides ==
The first b-side of the single is "Solace", and appears exclusively on the CD version of the single. The track was written and recorded during the 'Meltdown' album sessions, but missed the final cut. Two versions were recorded, this one which appears on the "Starcrossed" single and another version will be kept to feature on an upcoming film soundtrack. Mark: "This has potential for greatness. It's a bit like a heavy 'I'm Gonna Fall' with one big phat chorus." This track also appeared as a bonus track on the US version of "Meltdown".

The single's second b-side appears exclusively on the 7" gatefold and DVD versions of "Starcrossed. "Cool It Down" is a fast paced, quite short song which was originally written and recorded for "Meltdown" but Cool It Down eventually missed the cut and was released as the B-side to the Starcrossed single, and as a bonus track on the US version of "Meltdown". Mark: "Fast paced, pounding drums and a chorus as catchy as a world champion frisbee catcher. Destined to be a mosh pit favourite.

== Music video ==
The video for "Starcrossed" was again directed by Jeff Thomas. The video is basically a classic Romeo and Juliet tale, filmed on location in Romania, the video sees the band perform the track in an old church with blue neon crosses surrounding them, and Charlotte on the piano.

Mark has commented on the video as follows: "We flew to Romania to shoot this tribute to Romeo and Juliet. The performance was shot in a church in Bucharest. The local priest was pretty cool but he got annoying telling us to turn the music down and blowing out the candles because wax was dripping on his floors! The story is a bit Ghost Whisperer! Oops, hope I didn't ruin the end?... The video's definitely our most epic / grand yet. Strongly inspired by Romeo & Juliet, thousands of candles, blue neon crosses, real actors and shot widescreen. Should look very cinematic."

"Starcrossed" was also released as a DVD. It contained "Starcrossed" and "Cool It Down" as audio tracks, the music videos for "Starcrossed" and "Girl From Mars" as well as a trailer for the upcoming "Star Wars Republic Commando" game.

== Track listings ==
CD

1. "Starcrossed" (Wheeler)
2. "Solace" (Wheeler)

7"

1. "Starcrossed" (Wheeler)
2. "Cool It Down" (Wheeler)

DVD

1. "Starcrossed (DVD Audio)" (Wheeler)
2. "Cool It Down (DVD Audio)" (Wheeler)
3. "Starcrossed (Video)" (Wheeler)
4. "Girl From Mars (Video)" (Wheeler)
5. "Star Wars Republic Commander Trailer"

== Charts ==
| Chart (2004) | Peak position |
|---|---|
| Ireland (IRMA) | 43 |
| Scotland (OCC) | 21 |
| UK Singles (OCC) | 22 |
