= You Can't Have It All =

Single by Ash

from the album Twilight of the Innocents
- Released: 9 April 2007 (Download); 16 April 2007 (Physical release)
- Songwriter: Tim Wheeler

Ash singles chronology
"Renegade Cavalcade" (2004)	"You Can't Have It All" (2007)	"Polaris" (2007)

"You Can't Have It All" is the name of the first single from Ash's 2007 album, Twilight of the Innocents. The single received its first play on 7 March on Jo Whiley's Radio 1 show. It entered the UK Top 40 at No. 16 on 22 April 2007.

== Track listing ==
CD

1. "You Can't Have It All" (Wheeler)
2. "Saskia" (Wheeler)

7" Poster Bag

1. "You Can't Have It All" (Wheeler)
2. "Ghosts" (Wheeler)

7" Gatefold

1. "You Can't Have It All" (Wheeler)
2. "Comet Tempel 1" (Wheeler)

iTunes Exclusive EP

1. "You Can't Have It All"
2. "You Can't Have It All (Acoustic)"
3. "You Can't Have It All (Demo)"

== Format ==
The single was released in the following formats

- 1 CD version with the B-side of "Saskia", one of the 14 songs which was recorded for the album.
- 2 7" versions, each with their own exclusive B-side. One a gatefold, one with a fold out poster that slots into the gatefold, both of which are coloured vinyl. One of the 7"s had the B-side of "Ghosts" a song which was previously intentioned to be a B-side of Ash's previous single "Renegade Cavalcade" but was abandoned, and the other having a track called "Comet Tempel 1", previously called "What Is The Meaning?".
- Download – The CD and 7" versions of the single was available to download, along with exclusive live, acoustic and demo versions.

== Music video ==
The music video was directed by Jeff Thomas, the video however was spread by the band in an incomplete stage, reaching various video channels, including YouTube. The final version was released a week later on 7 March, premiering on NME.com. Days later it was shown fully complete on Kerrang! TV, MTV2 and other music stations, as well as the band's Veoh profile. The video was shot in Dukes Island Studios in London.
