= Polaris (Ash song) =

Single by Ash

from the album Twilight of the Innocents
- Released: 15 June 2007 (ROI); 18 June 2007 (UK/USA)
- Genre: Alternative rock
- Songwriter: Tim Wheeler.

Ash singles chronology
"You Can't Have It All" (2007)	"Polaris" (2007)	"End of the World" (2007)

"Polaris" is the second single from the album Twilight of the Innocents by the band Ash. It was released on 15 June 2007 in Ireland and the United Kingdom, and in the United States on 18 June 2007. It reached number 32 in the UK singles chart, and as of 2022 remains their last single to have reached the UK top 40 singles chart.

The band released the video for the song to their YouTube profile on 26 May.

B-side "Chinese New Year" first featured as an acoustic version in the Ash road-movie, "Episode 1: Road Movie" and can be found on the DVD format of "Burn Baby Burn".

== Production ==
Tim Wheeler revealed that the song was written while he was on a break in the South of France. He said:

I was on holiday and I ran into a friend who works for U2 doing their public relations. It was totally by coincidence and she invited us to come and hang out with Bono in his holiday home there. He and The Edge have two mansions on the beach side by side and I didn't have a hotel booked for the last few nights. And Bono said: "Sure why don't you just stay here" We had one beautiful house to ourselves and there was an old piano there. And I sat down one day and wrote the melody for Polaris.

== Track listings ==
CD

1. "Polaris (Album Version)" - 4:32
2. "Come On Over" - 4:55

7" Poster Bag

1. "Polaris (Album Version)"
2. "Kingdom Of Shadow"

7" Gatefold

1. "Polaris (Album Version)"
2. "Chinese New Year"

Download EP1

1. "Polaris (Album Version)"
2. "Polaris (Acoustic)"
3. "Polaris (Superbass Dub Remix)"

Download EP2

1. "Polaris (Demo)"
2. "Polaris (Superbass Remix)"
3. "Polaris (Root-id Re-Rub)"
4. "Polaris (Streetlife DJ's Remix)"
