= Orpheus (Ash song) =

2004 single by Ash

Single by Ash

from the album Meltdown
- B-side: "Everybody's Happy Nowadays"; "Tinseltown"
- Released: 3 May 2004
- Length: 4:16
- Label: Infectious
- Songwriter: Tim Wheeler
- Producer: Nick Raskulinecz

Ash singles chronology
"Clones" (2004)	"Orpheus" (2004)	"Starcrossed" (2004)

"Orpheus" is the second single released in a physical format from the Meltdown album by the band Ash. It was released on 3 May 2004 and reached number 13 on the UK Singles Chart. It was released as a single CD (released as only one CD version, the first time since 1997) as a gatefold 7-inch vinyl, as well as on DVD format. It was nominated for the Kerrang! Award for Best Single.

== Inspiration and sound ==
Orpheus was inspired by a Jack Kerouac on the road experience, similar to that of the film Y Tu Mama Tambien. Wheeler has said that, "The song's sort of based on this idea of like a Mexican road song sort of thing. I wrote it after watching this Mexican movie where these two kids go on this road trip with this girl, it's a rights of passage kind of thing. So I always thought it had this Mexican flavour, in fact when we first wrote the song it was called 'Dirty Sanchez' for a while!"

Additionally, it is also inspired by a screen test Tim had a couple of years ago to play the Ewan McGregor part in 2001's 'Moulin Rouge!'. "So I was in there with Baz Luhrmann, he is taking me through the whole thing and it was because he based the whole movie on the Greek myth of Orpheus. It's a weird song. It's about hitting the road and taking off and not being able to look back, just keep going is the theme. It's about a guy who joins him in fuckin' hell". Tim explains.

"Orpheus" has been described by Ash's bassist, Mark Hamilton, as being "Chilli Peppers meet The Doors, Sabbath and well.. us". Rick later described it as being "a classic Tim Wheeler summer song with big riffs and mad freak out bits in it, that's quite a journey of a song. A musical journey." Originally, the song was less complicated, and was missing its mid-song breakdown and intersection, but, despite the record label's pleas, it was included.

== Usage ==
Ever since its first appearance at the Royal Albert Hall for the Teenage Cancer Trust charity, it has appeared in almost every Ash performance, and also appears on the limited edition live Meltdown CD and the Commando EP.

== B-sides ==
The first B-side of the single is "Everybody's Happy Nowadays", a cover of the Buzzcocks single from their Singles Going Steady compilation, with a guest appearance from Coldplay's lead singer, Chris Martin, who sings lead vocals in the chorus. The song was recorded for the soundtrack to the film Shaun of the Dead.

The single's second B-side is Ash's longest released track (until A-Z series single "Sky Burial" in 2010), "Tinseltown", which was originally meant to appear on the album itself. Mark has described it as "a 9½ minute epic which goes on a music odyssey, covers every genre from '4 to the Floor Handbag' to Sonic Youth spaz outs and kraut rock". The song alternates between gentle acoustic and harsh dance floor beats.

== Video and DVD ==
Directed by Jeff Thomas, the video centres around car chases across the Almerian desert of Spain with two bandits chasing the band in a Gumball Rally style vehicle. Mark described it as follows: "The video was made in Almeria, Southern Spain. It's basically a car chase across the desert with two bandits trying to run us off the road, total Wacky Racers stuff. Intercut with us performing in a dirty biker bar it's a full throttle sweatfest!"

Wheeler has described it as: "It was fantastic, basically; flying off to Spain, getting in a car, smashing it up and rocking out! By the end of it the car was pretty much totaled on one side so we had to film the last shots from the other side of the car. The cars were like totally mangled. It was great, we got to drive through barrels of water as well, as you can see later on. The way we've got the numbers on the screen is, I suppose, reminiscent of a computer game."

"Orpheus" was also released as a DVD. It contained "Orpheus" and "Tinseltown" as audio tracks, the music videos for "Orpheus" and download only single "Clones" and a video of the making of "Orpheus".

== Track listings ==
CD

1. "Orpheus" (Wheeler)
2. "Everybody's Happy Nowadays" (Shelley)
3. "Tinseltown" (Wheeler)

7-inch

1. "Orpheus" (Wheeler)
2. "Everybody's Happy Nowadays" (Shelley)

DVD

1. "Orpheus (DVD Audio)" (Wheeler)
2. "Tinseltown (DVD Audio)" (Wheeler)
3. "Orpheus (Video)" (Wheeler)
4. "Clones (Video)" (Wheeler)
5. "The Making of Orpheus"
