= A–Z Series =

- The complete A–Z Series front and back covers mosaic

Box set by Ash
- Released: 12 October 2009 – 27 September 2010 (one single every two weeks)
- Recorded: 2007–2010
- Studio: Atomic Heart (New York City)
- Genres: Indie rock; alternative rock; power pop
- Length: 112:50 (excluding B-sides)
- Label: Atomic Heart
- Producers: Ash; Claudius Mittendorfer

Ash chronology
Twilight of the Innocents (2007)	A–Z Series (2009)	The Best of Ash (2011)

Volume 1 compilation cover
- Singles A–M; Released 19 April 2010

Volume 2 compilation cover
- Singles N–Z; Released 27 September 2010

A–Z Series complete compilation
- Singles A–Z Noyes Records Vinyl Compilation; Released 6 November 2012

The A–Z Series is a series of singles released by Northern Irish rock band Ash. Consisting of 26 singles, each represented by a letter of the alphabet, the singles were first released on a fortnightly basis from 12 October 2009 until 27 September 2010 on 7-inch vinyl and by download. Along with the 26 primary singles the series also includes 21 B-sides, 13 remixes, 7 acoustic tracks and 2 live tracks which were sporadically released in various formats. The series was later released in various other formats, including two compilation CDs Volume 1 (singles A–M) released on 19 April 2010 and Volume 2 (singles N–Z) released on 11 October 2010, a compilation of all 26 tracks on three vinyl LPs was released on 6 November 2012 through Noyes Records and finally a compact cassette featuring 15 of the band's favourite tracks from the series was released for Cassette Store Day, titled Letters from Alphabet City.

The series spawned six radio singles; "Return of White Rabbit", "True Love 1980", "Space Shot", "War with Me", "Binary", and "Carnal Love".

== Background and recording ==
The way people listen to music has changed, with the advent of the download the emphasis has reverted to single tracks. It hasn't helped that most people have forgotten how to make a decent album. I'm constantly disappointed with records I buy

— Tim Wheeler, June 2007

=== Split from Infectious Records ===
The band's previous album, Twilight of the Innocents, was released on 29 June 2007. From this the band members themselves formed Atomic Heart Records, setting up headquarters in New York City, calling their new studio Atomic Heart. Band members Tim and Mark both moved to New York; "It was a dream of mine, ever since our first American tour in the mid-1990s, to live in New York", whilst drummer Rick resided in Edinburgh's Craiglockhart, commuting to the New York Studio on a regular basis and working in "intensive bursts". The announcement itself of the band's boycott on the album format came at the time of release for Twilight of the Innocents, which the band called "their final album"—sparking rumours over the possibility of Ash splitting up.

=== Recording at Atomic Heart Studio ===
Upon entering the studio, the band recorded "Survivor", later titled "Ichiban", "Coming Around Again" a cover of Carly Simon, a Beach Boys cover of "Do You Wanna Dance?". Soon after several early titles of tracks surfaced on the band's official website, including "Survivor"—now titled "Ichiban", "Prypiat" which was written originally for Twilight of the Innocents, but was not finished in time to make the album, "Return of White Rabbit" which at the time Tim Wheeler supposedly joked about being their comeback single, "Nouvelle Adventures" which features both Tim and Mark on bass guitar, "No Face (Jesus Christ)", "Daedalus", as well as "Hospital Song" and "Lay Down Your Arms" which were both originally intended for Twilight of the Innocents. Soon after more titles were leaked, including "Space Shot" and "Tracer (Without You)".

In NME, vocalist and guitarist Tim Wheeler stated "We wanted to be the first people to do it like this" also saying, "I think it'll be great for our fans waiting every two weeks knowing they're going to get a song and wondering what it'll be like. It'll be fun".

Bassist Mark Hamilton also spoke of the merits of releasing in an alternative way:

we thought we'd come up with a different model where we never really had to be actually be away, that might work better. That was one of the reasons. We had the freedom when launching our own label as well, to try something different, so we're going to give it a go. I think if it works, a lot of people might copy it.

Custom "Return of White Rabbit" artworks; 'playing cards' by drummer Rick McMurray, 'apocalyptic bunny rabbit' by vocalist/guitarist Tim Wheeler and 'day-glo stencil' by bassist Mark Hamilton

== Artwork ==
Each single is assigned a specific colour and letter A–Z, prequel track "Return of White Rabbit" features the upside down stylised as ʁ, representing the rabbit. The front of each single simply shows the letter followed by the band's logo below, whilst on the back the track name is shown. The coloured artwork has also been used for the promotion of their A–Z Tour, with each colour representing a place and a letter of the alphabet, similarly the band through their forum and the assistance of their webmaster have allowed fans to create their own avatars and use emoticons in the A–Z style. Almost all of the artwork for the series was created by Post 98 Design and Modo Productions, with the exception of the cassette Letters from Alphabet City which was created by Elisa Dalla Tor and handmade "Return of White Rabbit" and "War with Me" CD singles which were created by the band.

== Release ==
The 26 singles of the A–Z Series were released once every two weeks through both digital download and 7" limited edition vinyl. The opening to the series was a free download "Return of White Rabbit", released on 18 May 2009, promoting the track were three music videos, an animated one created by Big Button, a home-made one—following the 'White Rabbit' around New York City, and a live footage video, filmed by fans at Thekla in Bristol. The first single to be announced for release was "True Love 1980", opening the series on 12 October 2009, with subscription to the series itself opening on 5 October 2009.

The band in October 2009 confirmed that only the first half of the A–Z Series were "set in stone", with mastering taking place, and the artwork, pressing and release dates confirmed, but the second half of the series would at the time be decided once the series had been launched, with the band holding a then total of 44 tracks recorded, and plans to re-enter the recording studio again in late 2009, "the first six months are set in stone, but the second half is still flexible. It's nice to have that kind of freedom".

=== Digital downloads ===
The digital subscription for the A–Z Series is offered worldwide; however, the United Kingdom service differs to the rest of the world. The subscription service in the United Kingdom is provided by 7digital, with the fortnightly single released on a Monday, and other non-subscription UK downloads through 7digital, Amazon, Play.com, HMV, iTunes and other download services providing the tracks on the day before subscribers. The rest of the world service is provided by Topspin, the band have not used Topspin in the UK as they wanted each single to be chart eligible.

The digital subscription service was set to launch originally on 5 October 2009, but was delayed and launched two days later on 8 October 2009. A free download of 'pre-A–Z' single "Return of White Rabbit" was launched digitally on 18 May 2009, whilst the A–Z Series was celebrated on 14 October by the release of the original 'extended mix' and an 'Atomic Heart' mix of "Return of White Rabbit", available for free download through sneakattackmedia.com.

=== Limited 7" vinyl ===
Our vinyls [sic] are strictly limited collectors items and are something we really wanted to do as we've always demanded our singles are released on 7". Even when previous labels didn't want to release them we forced their hand. The box when complete is worth it's [sic] price, it's a very sexy piece.

We always said we were going to do A–Z compilations. Those who feel duped / ripped off can get off their soapboxes, my heart bleeds for you... We're just past the 1/3 mark of the A–Z and the bonus tracks are only just starting to trickle out to subscribers. We've publicized the sheer quantity of tracks that have been recorded. These are all going to get used. This has been the most prolific writing / recording period of our career and we love the diversity of the output. We're under no illusions that not everyone's going to like every song / direction but hopefully we'll cover all bases by the series' end.

— Mark Hamilton on the subject of release format, February 2010

Subscription for the 7" singles opened on 6 October 2009; the vinyl, whilst costly for both the band and customer, was something the band demanded, as with previous singles whilst still signed, the band ensured all their singles were released on 7-inch vinyl. The singles were each limited to 1000 copies and were each collector's items; the complete vinyl subscription cost £130, or £140 including a special box to store them all in. The vinyl subscription service was provided by Recordstore.co.uk, whilst other retailers would also be given a small number of the singles, to sell at each release. Steve Wheeler of Recordstore commented on the partnership with Ash as "being chosen by an innovative and popular band like Ash is testament to the quality service that Recordstore.co.uk provide forward-thinking labels and artists"

=== Compilation CD ===
The band released two compilation CDs of the series: Volume 1 covered the letters A–M and Volume 2 the letters N–Z. The compilations were released on CD, limited CD/DVD and digitally. Some fans criticized the band's choice to release a CD, pointing out its similarity to an album, but bassist Mark Hamilton responded that it was always their intention and it was about making the A–Z Series available for everyone.

On 24 February the Japanese version of Volume 1 was announced, featuring two disks, unlike the standard UK one-disc version, with the first disc holding the A–M singles and 7 B-sides; "Return of the White Rabbit", "Coming Around Again", "The Creeps", "CTRL-ALT-DEL", "Do You Feel It?" and exclusively "Kamakura" and "Disenchanted" with the second disc featuring 14 remixes, acoustics and already digitally released B-sides "Lay Down Your Arms" and "Gallows Hill". The CD was released earlier than the UK version, on 7 April 2010.

On 28 July 2010 RecordStore.co.uk announced the second compilation—A–Z Volume 2 for a release on 11 October 2010. The release unlike Volume 1 did not include any acoustic tracks, remixes or a DVD, and only had three bonus tracks as opposed to the previous five due to the length of Single Y "Sky Burial". The full track listing was revealed on 6 August 2010, with the three new B-sides being "Spellbound", "Nightfall" and David Bowie track "Teenage Wildlife". The Japanese Volume 2 also included two exclusive B-sides—"Running to the Ocean" and "Midnight in the Garden".

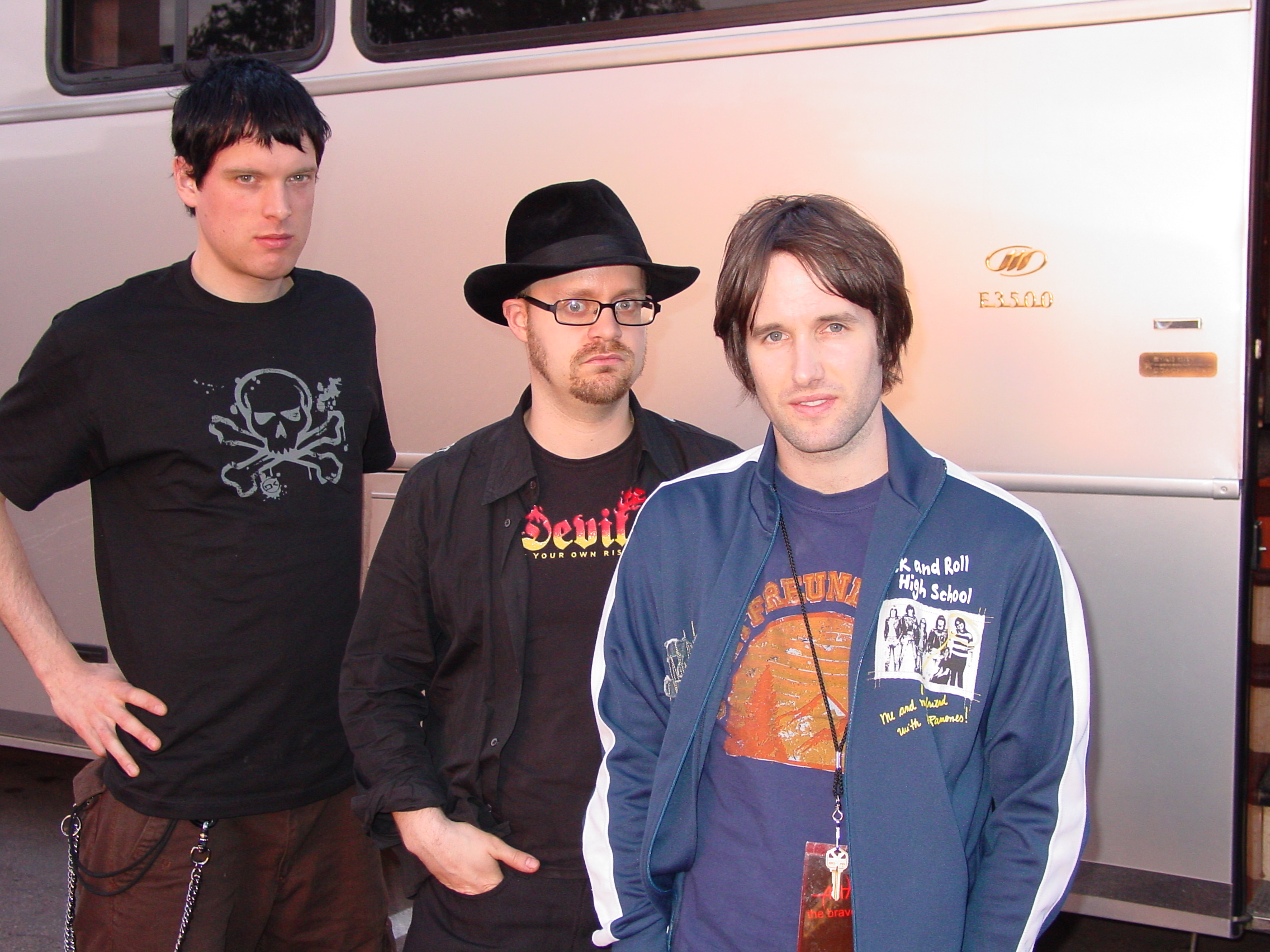
The band's line-up for the touring and recording of the A–Z Series; bassist Mark Hamilton, drummer and backing vocalist Rick McMurray and vocalist and guitarist Tim Wheeler

=== A is for Ash ===
A is for Ash is a film documentary of the band's A–Z 2009 tour from Aldershot to Zennor. It was directed by Josh Klezkin and produced by the members of Ash. The documentary features interviews from Tim Wheeler, Mark Hamilton and Rick McMurray of Ash, as well as featuring BBC DJ Steve Lamacq, Emmy The Great & Ian Wright amongst others, as well as live performances on the A–Z tour of Spaceshot and Arcadia, acoustic performances, the final days of recording the A–Z Series in New York and behind the scenes at some of the TV, radio and other media appearances.

The documentary was released onto Region 0 DVD, limited to 5000 copies, released on 19 April 2010 in the A–Z Volume 1 CD compilation.

During the course and after the A–Z tour the band released four short webisodes onto YouTube and NME.com, which acted as promotions for the complete documentary, featuring some footage that would be used in A Is For Ash, and some exclusive content. The trailer for the complete documentary was released on 3 March 2010.

=== Other releases ===
Amongst the core 26 singles were a large number of studio B-sides, which were sporadically released over the course of the A–Z Series. The first three radio singles from the A–Z Series—"Return of White Rabbit", "True Love 1980" and "Spaceshot"—were each accompanied by a digital EP—The Rehash EP and Space Reshot EP, both of which were collections of remixes by Snitch Brothers, Jaymo & Andy George, Pete Doyle, Timothy Allen, Loverush UK. An acoustic EP, featuring 7 of the A–Z singles, was also made available on 19 April 2010.

== Promotion ==
=== Video ===
The band worked with a number of directors and companies to produce music videos for the A–Z Series, a selection of the singles—the radio singles were given higher budgets for promotion and consequently the band worked with such people as Nico Jones on "Return of White Rabbit" and "Binary"—who also directed the initial A–Z teaser trailer which previewed many of the upcoming singles. Director Daniel Garcia worked on the music videos for "True Love 1980" and "Space Shot" whilst Alex Turvey directed "Carnal Love" and Alex Beck directed "War with Me". Many of the non-radio singles also have low budget videos for them—Josh Kletzkin directed "Joy Kicks Darkness", "Arcadia" and "Tracers", KINo sequenced the video for "Neon", whilst singles such as "Pripyat" and "Ichiban" use material not specifically created for Ash.

From 7 October 2009 Ash used NME.com to host a four-part web series of tour videos, directed by Josh Kletzkin. The videos would serve as tasters for the DVD release 'A is for Ash'. Episode 1 featured rehearsals in London, behind the scenes at Live from Studio Five, amongst other interviews. Episode 2 shows the A–Z Tour, from Aldershot to Carlisle, with Episode 3 taking Dundee through to Jersey, and Episode 4 covering the remaining dates.

=== Competition ===
Throughout the A–Z Series the band orchestrated various competitions on both their NME content area and on their official website. One of the first competitions launched coincided with the release of"Return of White Rabbit", the band asked fans to come up with a back-story to the song's title, "where is the white rabbit returning from?"—which would then be judged by the band, with the winner receiving a rare "Return of White Rabbit" handmade promo CD. "Why has the White Rabbit been away?" was the basis for the second competition and the final of the three "Return of White Rabbit" competitions to win handmade promos asked fans to design White Rabbit related art/photos and videos.

The opportunity to win "True Love 1980" test 7"s and handmade "Return of White Rabbit" CD promos began with the release of "True Love 1980". Later in November, NME offered the chance to win more test prints of "True Love 1980", "Joy Kicks" and "Arcadia" followed in January 2010 with "Space Shot" test vinyl. NME also offered the chance to win a free subscription to the A–Z Series. Similarly a free subscription to the A–Z Series was offered every night of the A–Z Tour in 2009—with show fliers containing a unique code—a raffle would then take place and the winning flier holder would be given a free subscription—giving the fliers value.

Opportunities to win tickets to all varieties of Ash performances were also given—including exclusive radio sessions with Kerrang! Radio XFM and tickets for Absolute Radio on 15 April 2010—tickets were also offered in a Music-News.com competition. Festival appearances such as Hop farm festival and Truck Festival 2009. Tickets to dates on the 2009 A–Z tour were also offered, as well as 2010 European dates.

Merchandise competitions included a Valentines day t-shirt draw, a chance to win a "Return of White Rabbit" t-shirt, an exclusive limited Atomic Heart Studios staff t-shirt and the opportunity to design a t-shirt which would be sold throughout all of the 2010 shows around the world, and have their winning design sent to them in a special frame. Other creative competitions included remixing single "Binary" the band choose the Argyle Raver Pornographic as the winning remix, and to direct a music video for B-sides to the A–Z Series.

With the 2009 A–Z Tour the opportunity for a one-on-three meet and greet was given for fans similarly in 2010 the chance for fans to win a dinner-date with the band at any stop on the UK tour was given. On the same tour the chance for local bands to support Ash was given—asking that those interested emailed a Myspace link and list of gigs previously played.

=== Press attention ===
The band gained significant media attention surrounding the A–Z Series. With interviews and other coverage running through newspapers and magazines such as The Guardian, The Herald, M Is for Music, News of the World, Billboard, Kerrang!, NME, East Mag, TUFS, culturedeluxe.com, Sport.co.uk, Randomville, Media Wales, MusicRadar, Counteract Magazine, Stereoboard, and Bunch.tv.

Radio sessions and interviews included Kerrang!, XFM, Absolute, and BBC 6 Music. Televised appearances included appearances on Live from Studio Five broadcast on Five on 15 October 2009, BBC E24, The Friday Show, Children In Need and Sky Sports Soccer AM. Several songs of the A–Z Series were also used on various TV adverts—"Physical World" was used for BBC's coverage of the Formula 1 Qualifying, whilst "Spheres" was used on Film4 and "There Is Hope Again" was used during Sky Sports coverage of England vs Hungary on 11 August 2010.

=== Live ===
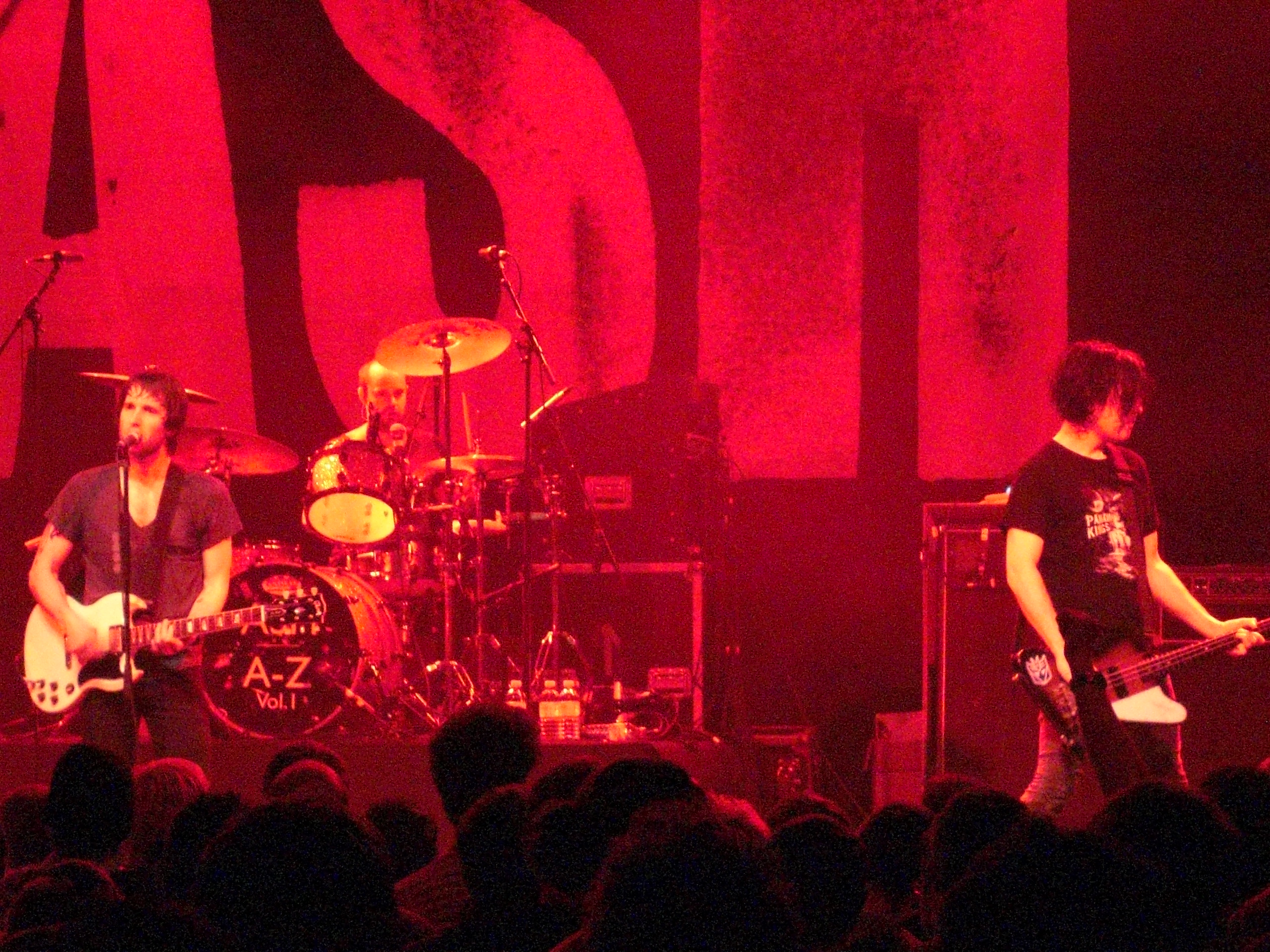
Tim Wheeler, Rick McMurray and Mark Hamilton performing live at O2 ABC in Glasgow in April 2010

The band embarked on a 4 date UK tour consisting of performances at Brighton Concorde 2 on 3 June, Portsmouth Wedgewood Rooms the following day and two dates at the London Bloomsbury Ballroom on 6 and 7 June 2009. At the performances they showcased new material, including "Space Shot", "True Love 1980" and "Return of White Rabbit".

Most notably of the band's touring antics during the A–Z Series was their 2009 A–Z Tour. The tour consisted of 26 dates across the United Kingdom, with each tour location based around the alphabet, choosing towns, cities and villages which correspond with letters A–Z. The tour began in Aldershot and ended in Zennor, gaining significant press coverage because of its uniqueness. Planning the tour bassist Mark Hamilton told eastmagazine.co.uk that the band looked for alternatives to the usual places they would visit on tour:

We told our agent that we don't want to go to the cities we would usually hit on a regular tour. Then he came back with a bunch of dates, but he had quite a lot of work to do on this. But that was good; it was good to make him actually work. ... There were a number of venues we told him to change, saying, "We usually play there, so get us something different."

In 2009 the band also played dates in their native Ireland—Dublin and Belfast. It was not until March 2010 that the band began touring again, playing dates in Tokyo, Japan New York, US and eventually onto a conventional UK tour circuit.

The band announced a full UK tour soon after, scheduled from 13 May 2010 in Paris, France, through Amsterdam in the Netherlands, Cologne, Hamburg, Munich, Stuttgart, Frankfurt am Main, Neuhausen ob Eck and Berlin in Germany, Oslo in Norway, Aarhus in Denmark, Vienna in Austria, Zurich in Switzerland, Brussels in Belgium and ending at Hurricane Festival in Scheeßel on 20 June 2010. Parts of this tour were rescheduled, but the majority of dates were completely canceled, with the band citing "personal reasons" for this decision which they "did not take lightly".

After originally being rumored to be playing a number of dates with The Automatic, it was instead announced that Ash and We Are Scientists would be playing a number of co-headline shows in Australia.

Tour dates of the A–Z Series
Date	Town/City	Country	Venue	Support
19 October 2009	Aldershot	England	West End Centre	Panama Kings
20 October 2009	Bradford	England	The Gasworks	Panama Kings
21 October 2009	Carlisle, Cumbria	England	The Brickyard	Panama Kings
23 October 2009	Dundee	Scotland	Fat Sam's	Panama Kings
24 October 2009	East Grange, Forres	Scotland	The Loft	Panama Kings
25 October 2009	Falkirk	Scotland	Behind the Wall	Panama Kings
27 October 2009	Gloucester, Gloucestershire	England	Guildhall	Panama Kings
28 October 2009	Hastings, East Sussex	England	Crypt	Panama Kings
30 October 2009	Ipswich, Suffolk	England	Corn Exchange	Panama Kings
31 October 2009	Saint Helier	Jersey	St.Helier Havana Club	Panama Kings
2 November 2009	Kingston upon Thames, London	England	The Peel	Panama Kings
3 November 2009	Loughborough, Charnwood Leicestershire	England	University	Panama Kings
4 November 2009	Milton Keynes, Buckinghamshire	England	Pitz Club	Panama Kings
6 November 2009	Newport	Wales	Tjs	Panama Kings
7 November 2009	Oldham, Greater Manchester	England	Castle	Panama Kings
8 November 2009	Plymouth, Devon	England	Hippo	Panama Kings
10 November 2009	Queen's Park, London	England	Corrib Rest	Panama Kings
11 November 2009	Rotherham, South Yorkshire	England	The Vault	Panama Kings
12 November 2009	Swansea, Wales	Wales	Sin City	Panama Kings
14 November 2009	Tunbridge Wells, Kent	England	Forum	Panama Kings
16 November 2009	Upper Norwood, London	England	Gipsy Hill Tavern	Panama Kings
17 November 2009	Ventnor, Isle of Wight	England	Winter Gardens	Panama Kings
19 November 2009	Worcester, Worcestershire	England	Dive Bar	Panama Kings
21 November 2009	Exmouth, East Devon	England	Pavilion	Panama Kings
22 November 2009	Yeovil, Somerset	England	Orange Box	Panama Kings
23 November 2009	Zennor, Cornwall	England	Village Hall	Panama Kings
25 November 2009	Dublin	Ireland	Button Factory	Panama Kings
26 November 2009	Belfast	Ireland	Belfast Spring and Airbrake	Panama Kings
18 December 2009	Darlington	England	Inside Out	
20 March 2010	Dublin	Ireland	7UP, St Andrews Lane	Republic of Loose
3 April 2010	New York City	America	Santos Party House	
6 April 2010	Tokyo	Japan	Daikanyama UNIT	
7 April 2010	Shibuya, Tokyo	Japan	Tower Records	
17 April 2010	London	England	Record Store Day, Acoustic session, Rough Trade East	
19 April 2010	Southampton	England	Acoustic HMV session	
19 April 2010	Southampton	England	Southampton University	El Raccoon
20 April 2010	Cambridge	England	Acoustic Fopp session	
20 April 2010	Cambridge	England	Junction	Violet Bones
21 April 2010	Norwich	England	Acoustic HMV session	
21 April 2010	Norwich	England	Waterfront	Blighters
23 April 2010	Birmingham	England	Irish Centre	The Parlotones
24 April 2010	Leeds	England	Metropolitan	The Parlotones
25 April 2010	Newcastle	England	O2 Academy	The Parlotones
27 April 2010	Glasgow	Scotland	O2 ABC	What the Heroes Say
28 April 2010	Manchester	England	O2 Academy 2	The Parlotones
30 April 2010	Bristol	England	O2 Academy	The Parlotones
1 May 2010	Brighton	England	Concorde	The Parlotones
2 May 2010	Oxford	England	O2 Academy	The Parlotones
4 May 2010	London	England	Electric Ballroom	
5 May 2010	Northampton	England	Roadmenders	
6 May 2010	London	England	Koko	Infadels
13 May 2010	Paris	France	Point FMR	
14 May 2010	Amsterdam	Netherlands	Sugar Factory	
15 May 2010	Cologne	Germany	Luxor	
16 May 2010	Hamburg	Germany	Logo	
17 May 2010	Berlin	Germany	C-Club	
19 May 2010	Oslo	Norway	John Dee	
20 May 2010	Aarhus	Denmark	Vox Hall	
22 May 2010	Munich	Germany	59:1	
23 May 2010	Vienna	Austria	Flex	
25 May 2010	Zurich	Switzerland	Abart	
26 May 2010	Stuttgart	Germany	Roehre	
27 May 2010	Frankfurt am Main	Germany	Batschkapp	
28 May 2010	Brussels	Belgium	Botanique	
18 June 2010	Neuhausen ob Eck	Germany	Southside Festival	
20 June 2010	Scheeßel	Germany	Hurricane Festival	
27 June 2010	Glastonbury	England	Glastonbury Festival, John Peel Stage	
1 July 2010	Bwcle	Wales	The Tivoli	The Hutts & Revurb
6 July 2010	Barrow-in-Furness	England	The Nines	Switchboard Spectacular
7 July 2010	Preston	England	53 Degrees	
11 July 2010	Perth and Kinross	Scotland	T In The Park, Red Bull Bedroom Jam Futures Stage	
1 August 2010	Queensland	Australia	Splendour in the Grass	
30 July 2010	Naeba	Japan	Fuji Rock Festival	
3 August 2010	Sydney	Australia	Metro	We Are Scientists (co-headline)
4 August 2010	Melbourne	Australia	Billboard	We Are Scientists (co-headline)
17 August 2010	Belfast	Northern Ireland	Belsonic 2010	
19 August 2010	Gampel	Switzerland	Gampel Festival	
21 August 2010	Kempische Steenweg, Kiewit	Belgium	Pukkelpop	
26 August 2010	Manchester	England	Manchester Academy 3	
27 August 2010	Leeds	England	Reading and Leeds Festivals	
28 August 2010	Reading	England	Reading and Leeds Festivals	

== Reception ==
=== Singles A–M (Volume 1) ===
Volume 1
Singles A-M
Review scores
Source	Rating
MusicOMH	4.5/5 stars
Gigwise.com	3/5 stars
BBC	(positive)
Q	3/5 stars
News of the World	4/5 stars
Drowned in Sound	7/10 stars
Contactmusic.com	(positive)
AllMusic	4/5 stars

The first single from the series "Return of White Rabbit" received fairly mixed reactions, with the band showcasing a more unfamiliar electronic side of the band, however NME reacted positively "a weirdly effective funk-pop song" Kerrang! also praised the release saying; "they're only doing singles now, if this new humdigger of a tune is anything to go by, then it will be a decision well made" whilst The Irish Times rated the track 3/5, whilst The Times said regarding the single "...this revelatory rump-shaker, triggering pleasure sensors we didn't even know we had".

Bands such as New Found Glory and Young Guns have criticized the band in Rock Sound magazine, with New Found Glory posting an apology after Rock Sound supposedly twisted their words.

Mark Beaumont wrote on BBC Music "they've lost none of their melodic punch since Girl From Mars fell to Earth" and praised the consistency of singles A-M "the most remarkable thing about the A–Z project is that, thus far, every track really is worthy of being a single." David Welsh of MusicOMH poked fun at the similarities between the conventional album of compilation, but was very positive of the release as a whole: "Their subsequent fresh approach and retreat from the album formula appears to have reinvigorated the Downpatrick threesome with a new sense of purpose and, quite curiously, resulted in one of the best albums of their long and illustrious career"

Paul Brown at Drowned in Sound described the release format as "While they haven't quite reinvented the wheel with these songs, they have certainly pumped up its tyres and given it some shiny new hubcaps", speaking with praise of singles A ("True Love 1980") through till H ("Space Shot"); "So great are the high points of the collection that it's a shame that it starts to run out of steam slightly towards the end", yet with final single of the half M ("War with Me") he believed it "revives things at the death with a grand piano motif and yet another mega chorus". Ben Walton of Contactmusic.com believed the singles lack of cohesion as a compilation was the A–Z Series' main strength; "Ash have been set free to sprawl however they see fit across genre boundaries" going onto favor tracks such as "Arcadia" and "Neon", also calling "Dionysian Urge" "one of the best songs Ash have ever delivered".

Phil Mongredien of Q magazine criticized the similarity between a compilation of singles and the conventional album, writing; "it's not obvious how this format differs from the peaks and troughs of a regular album, high points largely canceled out by the more workaday material", but noted the albums merits as "Arcadia" and "Joy Kicks Darkness", Jon Bye of Gigwise.com was critical of the direction taken in some of the singles which use synthesizer parts advising the band to "stick to the rock and roll you're good at" but praised the synth laced "Arcadia", comparing it to Muse.

=== Singles N–Z (Volume 2) ===
Volume 2
Singles N-Z
Review scores
Source	Rating
Kerrang!	KKKK
Q	3/5 stars

Mark Griffiths of Kerrang! magazine rated the compilation of singles N–Z 4/5 praising "they've lost none of their melodic abrasive songwriting genius" recommending the highlights of the 2nd half to the series as "Sky Burial", "Binary" and "Physical World". Andy Fyfe of Q magazine recommended "Binary", "Dare to Dream" and "Carnal Love", rating it 3/5—the same rating given to Volume 1.

=== Sales and chart performance ===
As of December 2009 the vinyl subscription sold out, with only limited amounts of past and future singles available on the band's official website and other various stores. Despite much publicity, none of the singles reached the UK Top 40, with only "Instinct" reaching the UK Top 75, at No.65. But the singles performed better on the UK Indie Singles Chart, with 15 of them reaching the top ten of that chart.

Letter	Title	Chart positions			Radio single
Letter	Title	UK	UK IND	UK DAN	Radio single
ʁ	"Return of White Rabbit"	–	–	31	✓
A	"True Love 1980"	148	12	31	✓
B	"Joy Kicks Darkness"	171	16	–	
C	"Arcadia"	114	13	–	
D	"Tracers"	140	8	–	
E	"The Dead Disciples"	139	11	–	
F	"Pripyat"	165	17	–	
G	"Ichiban"	176	18	–	
H	"Space Shot"	129	16	22	✓
I	"Neon"	120	11	–	
J	"Command"	131	12	–	
K	"Song of Your Desire"	104	6	–	
L	"Dionysian Urge"	106	8	–	
M	"War with Me"	114	9	–	✓

Letter	Title	Chart Positions				Radio single
Letter	Title	UK	UK IND	UK DAN	UK ROCK	Radio single
N	"Dare to Dream"	87	8	–	–	
O	"Mind Control"	101	5	–	–	
P	"Insects"	99	8	–	–	
Q	"Binary"	103	7	–	–	✓
R	"Physical World"	96	7	–	–	
S	"Spheres"	91	9	–	–	
T	"Instinct"	65	5	–	–	
U	"Summer Snow"	91	7	–	–	
V	"Carnal Love"	78	5	–	–	✓
W	"Embers"	79	7	–	–	
X	"Change Your Name"	84	10	–	1	
Y	"Sky Burial"	87	14	–	2	
Z	"There Is Hope Again"	92	14	–	–	

== Releases ==
There is a total of 26 singles in the A–Z Series, and 21 B-sides. Not all of the singles are radio singles; the ones that are, were accompanied by a music video. The title of each release was revealed the Wednesday after the previous release and was referred to as 'Ash Wednesday'.

Letter and Colour	Song and Length	Release	Details	Video
ʁ	"Return of White Rabbit"; 3:56	18 May 2009; Free digital download, handmade limited CD; 8 June 2009 – 1000 limited vinyl 14 October 2009 – Extended and remix versions	Three different artworks were made available, each individual piece of artwork has been hand created by the band themselves, Rick's pack of playing cards, Tim's apocalyptic bunny rabbits and Mark's day-glo stencils. The single was released as a free download on ash-official.com on 18 May. The track itself was penned by bassist Mark Hamilton. The band confirmed that the track is a 'prequel' to the series itself. On 14 October the band released the original full version of "Return of White Rabbit" which lasts for 6:24, as opposed to the original 3:56 cut, along with this was an 'Atomic Heart' remix, both were made available as free downloads on Sneak Attack Media.	The music video for ROWR debuted on 12 June, the music video was conceived by 'Big Button' and has an animated story to it; a boy who becomes jealous of another boy making advances on a girl he has feelings for, struggling to contain his feelings he eventually acts, crashing a car, taking his and the other boys life in the process. "Ash wanted to get away from the standard performance video in favour of something a little more interesting. As a result, Big Button was given free reign [sic] and concocted a dark tale of jealousy and horror wrapped in an accessible cartoon coating" The second video created for ROWR titled 'NYC Rabbit' was directed by Karen Lord and features Nickolas Kimbrell as 'the white rabbit', the video shows what a "typical night in NYC is like for a jolly ol' rabbit", the third video promotion for ROWR is a live version of the track, filmed at Thekla, Bristol were the band asked their audience to film the track on personal cameras.
A	"True Love 1980"; 4:06	12 October 2009; 1000 limited vinyl Digital download	Confirmed on 20 May by NME that the series would begin in September, giving the band the chance to promote the series, 'Return of the White Rabbit' was intended as a prequel to the series itself. The track is reported to be heavily centred around the use of synthesizers and keyboards. The track was premiered live on the band's June 2009 tour dates. A remix by Tiësto was released onto Myspace prior to the tracks actual release on 22 July 2009 The track itself was premiered on Steve Lamacq's 6Music radio show on Monday 24 August	The band shot the music video for "True Love 1980" in Portland, Oregon, the video was directed by Daniel Garcia, with acting from Meredith Adelaide. The video was added to music video stations NMETV and Bliss on 9 September 2009, and was added to the band's official website on 15 September, whilst a making of video was added to NME on 12 October 2009.
B	"Joy Kicks Darkness"; 5:55	26 October 2009; 1000 limited vinyl Digital	The track was announced as the third single in the series on 14 October on the band's official website. A 30-second clip of the track was added to amazon.co.uk on 17 October, whilst the track was premiered live on 19 October, at their performance in Aldershot.	The video was filmed across the A–Z tour, using live and behind the scenes footage. It was directed by Josh Kletzkin.
C	"Arcadia"; 4:02	9 November 2009; 1000 limited vinyl Digital	Announced on 4 November 2009 as 'C'.	A budget music video was filmed on the A–Z Tour, the video features various Arcade games being played by the band. The video was directed by Josh Kletzkin. After the single was voted as the fan favourite of the entire series a second music video for the track was released on 5 October 2010, directed by Nico Jones for Big Button.
D	"Tracers"; 3:31	23 November 2009; 1000 limited vinyl Digital	Originally titled "World Without You". The track was notable performed acoustically with Emmy The Great at a number of tour dates in 2009.	Two budget music videos were shot for Tracers, both directed by Josh Kletzkin. The first music video features guitarist & vocalist Tim Wheeler playing besides a beach, with a funfair and pier. The second music video is a live acoustic video of Tim and Emma-Lee Moss of Emmy The Great performing the song in a small room.
E	"The Dead Disciples"; 3:46	7 December 2009; 1000 limited vinyl Digital	One of the heaviest A–Z singles thus far, comparable to material from the band's album Meltdown, the song is also the first Ash song to use a double-kick drum. The Dead Disciples was written on a festival trip in September 2007 to Córdoba, Spain, with the lyrics making references to Irish writer and poet James Joyce and Greek myth Daedalus.	A music video for The Dead Disciples has been created but has yet to be released.
F	"Pripyat"; 4:21	21 December 2009; 1000 limited vinyl Digital	The song's title is a reference to Prypiat, Ukraine, an abandoned city after the events of the Chernobyl disaster, which lyricist of the song Tim Wheeler describes as a "lost citadel" and "the loneliest place on the planet". Prypiat was written and demoed originally for previous album Twilight of the Innocents.	The music video samples photographs from Robert Polidori's book Zones of Exclusion: Pripyat and Chernobyl.
G	"Ichiban"; 3:09	4 January 2010; 1000 limited vinyl Digital	Ichiban was the first A–Z track to be performed live, appearing at concerts in 2008 for the band's 1977 shows.	The music video contains footage from the British 1960 monster film Gorgo.
H	"Space Shot"; 4:14	18 January 2010; 1000 limited vinyl Digital	The track was performed live for the first time at Brighton Concorde 2 in June 2009. For Children in Need "Spaceshot" was televised on 20 November 2009, along with "Shining Light" and "True Love 1980", and was confirmed as letter 'H' on Jonathan Ross' radio show on 28 November. The single will be the second 'radio single' from the A–Z series.	Daniel Garcia, director of the video for previous radio single "True Love 1980", returned to direct. The video has a science fiction narrative, making reference to Star Wars, following a pilot escaping with a blindfolded person, pursued by soldiers and soon by space craft. The video was premiered on Myspace on 10 December 2009.
I	"Neon"; 4:08	1 February 2010; 1000 limited vinyl Digital	Neon was the 27th song written in the A–Z series. It is considered the spiritual successor to earlier A–Z track "Arcadia". Neon is described as a song "about chance". "Neon" was remixed by Beat Cave, which was released exclusively on the Japanese A–Z Volume 1 CD. "Neon" was performed in studio for Livestream and The Music Slut two days after release on 3 February 2010 for the first time. Without a fourth member present in the band the synthesizer and piano parts in Neon are provided by a prerecorded backing track.	The music video uses photographs taken and sequenced by KINo of the band in their New York studio, whilst a woman journeys around New York City.
J	"Command"; 2:35	15 February 2010; 1000 limited vinyl Digital	Command was acoustically covered in the A–Z Volume 1 acoustic bundle.	
K	"Song of Your Desire"; 3:36	1 March 2010; 1000 limited vinyl Digital		
L	"Dionysian Urge"; 4:06	15 March 2010; 1000 limited vinyl Digital		
M	"War with Me"; 3:33	29 March 2010; 1000 limited vinyl 90 Handmade limited CD; Digital	The song was premiered on BBC6Music's 'Ash Wednesday' celebrations on 17 February, and was the 3rd 'radio single' of the A–Z Series. The band handmade 90 limited edition CD single versions of the track, 50 of which were awarded to new subscribers, whilst the rest were given away in a competition.	The video was shot sporadically over 3 weeks, in China Town on 6 February 2010 and The Hamptons. Tim Wheeler was originally meant to be in the back of a 1960s Mercedes in one of the scenes, but it broke down en route to the shoot; instead they used a Jaguar. The video was directed by Alex Beck.
N	"Dare to Dream"; 5:05	12 April 2010; 1000 limited vinyl Digital	Dare to Dream was premiered on 11 April 2010 on the band's website. The track was remixed by Mogwai; 1000 limited remix singles were also made available to celebrate Record Store Day. The remix was available digitally to all those who had subscribed by 12 April 2010, free of charge.	
O	"Mind Control"; 2:52	26 April 2010; 1000 limited vinyl Digital		
P	"Insects"; 3:49	10 May 2010; 1000 limited vinyl Digital		
Q	"Binary"; 4:06	24 May 2010; 1000 limited vinyl Digital	Binary was announced on 14 April, and played for the first time on Rory McConnell's BBC Radio 1 show. Binary is the 5th radio single from the A–Z Series. A Facebook campaign was created to try to get "Binary" into the UK Top 40. Bloc Party member and at-the time Ash touring guitarist Russell Lissack remixed the track under the alias CO-PILOTS. It was made available on 25 May 2010.	The first music video was directed by Nico Jones of production company Big Button, who also produced 'Return of White Rabbit' and 'The A–Z Series Trailer'. The video was shot in New York on green screen and then sent over the Atlantic to Birmingham for editing and post-production. The video has a science fiction inspired theme. The video was released on 27 April 2010 and has received airplay on Q and NME TV. A second music video was released on 20 May 2010, exclusively on YouTube the video features long awaited footage from Slashed – an independent horror flick starring Ash, Coldplay and Dave Grohl, amongst others. It was originally shot in 2002, but was unreleased due to never being finished.
R	"Physical World"; 2:48	7 June 2010; 1000 limited vinyl Digital	Physical World was announced on 26 May 2010, it was originally coloured green, but later changed to light pink.	
S	"Spheres"; 6:08	21 June 2010; 1000 limited vinyl Digital	Spheres is the only track in the A–Z series where the singles letter – S – corresponds with the title. It was mentioned originally in April 2009 by Mark Hamilton, and later in June 2009 when a photo of Tim recording the track's piano part was posted on ash-official.com.	
T	"Instinct"; 3:52	5 July 2010; 1000 limited vinyl Digital	Instinct was officially announced on 23 June 2010 and was originally a light blue as opposed to brown. It was the highest charting of the A–Z series, peaking at #65 in the UK Singles Chart.	
U	"Summer Snow"; 3:30	19 July 2010; 1000 limited vinyl Digital	Summer Snow was announced on 1 July 2010 by Recordstore.co.uk. It originally corresponded with the colour purple. Summer Snow was first mentioned in a studio update by Tim in June 2009.	
V	"Carnal Love"; 4:01	2 August 2010; 1000 limited vinyl Digital	"Carnal Love" was the sixth radio single from the series; it was announced on 25 June 2010. Originally 'V' had a lime-green artwork colour.	Preview photographs of the video shoot were posted on the band's website on 22 July 2010. On 22 July 2010 an interview was posted on the band's YouTube with director Alex Turvey talking about the upcoming video. The music video was made available on 27 July. The video was intended by Tim and director Alex to have a perverse theme, using a lot of visual references to sex. Lily Vanilli was hired to prepare the cakes for the video shoot. It features sexually shaped desserts being prepared and served to Tim, who slowly eats course after course, before being covered in custard, fruits and rubbed up and down.
W	"Embers"; 4:21	16 August 2010; 1000 limited vinyl Digital	"Embers" was announced on 18 July 2010, along with its re-imagined artwork colour, originally a light grey it was changed to orange. Embers is one of the more punk-guitar driven tracks of the later half of the A–Z series. It looked set to hit an all-time high for an A–Z single in terms of chart positions, hitting number 23 in the UK midweek official chart update, before finishing at number 79.	
X	"Change Your Name"; 3:20	30 August 2010; 1000 limited vinyl Digital	"Change Your Name" was announced on 18 July 2010, with a sample available on Amazon.co.uk the same day. The track was written by drummer Rick McMurray, and first mentioned on the band's website on 18 May 2009. The song charted at number one in the UK Rock Chart.	
Y	"Sky Burial"; 10:16	13 September 2010; 1000 limited vinyl Digital	Sky Burial was announced on 18 July 2010. An instrumental, it is the longest track of the entire A–Z series standing at 10:18, and will be comparable to previous album's title track "Twilight of the Innocents". It charted at number two in the UK Rock Chart.	
Z	"There Is Hope Again"; 3:48	27 September 2010; 1000 limited vinyl Digital	"There Is Hope Again" was announced on 18 July 2010. A 30 second sample was added to Amazon.co.uk the same day. It was hinted on the band's website ash-official.com that fans should keep an eye on Sky Sports regarding the final single.	

=== B-sides ===
Song	Date	Release	Details
"Lay Down Your Arms"	22 December 2009	Free digital download	Free digital download for all those subscribed to the A–Z Downloads and Vinyl collection. The track was written and demoed for Twilight of the Innocents, but never made the record stage. The track was given as a thank you to fans for subscribing and bearing with the band through the various problems with releasing earlier singles in the A–Z Series, including postal strikes and the band's distribution supplying various online retailers with the incorrect audio files, resulting in some fans experiencing sound quality issues. It lasts 3:43
"Gallows Hill"	15 January 2010	Free digital download	Second free B-side to the A–Z Series, released to all those subscribed to the A–Z Series before 14 January 2010. The song is named after Gallows Hill in Downpatrick. It lasts 3:43
"Night Terrors"	2 March 2010	Free digital download	Third free B-side to the A–Z Series, released to all those subscribed to the A–Z Series before 25 February 2010. Ash's official site describes the track as: "Musically this dark and menacing memorial merges spiky new-wave punk guitars with uptempo disco beats, overdriven synthesizers and a chorus hook that would kick Dr. Who into a parallel universe." It lasts 3:50
"Empire of Sand"	27 March 2010	Free digital download	Fourth free B-side to the A–Z Series, released to all those subscribed to the A–Z Series before midnight Thursday 25 March 2010. It is described on the band's official site as: "Strap yourself in for a haunting ghost ride through the nihilistic mind of Richard Wilson McMurray. 'Empire of Sand' is a deeply honest introspection of the crushing void experienced as one's foundations crumble around a devastating life event." It lasts 3:18
"Coming Around Again"	19 April 2010	A–Z Volume 1 CD	Cover of Carly Simon, the Ash version was premiered on East Village Radio on 30 March 2010.
"The Creeps"	19 April 2010	A–Z Volume 1 CD	
"CTRL-ALT-DEL"	19 April 2010	A–Z Volume 1 CD	Written by Rick McMurray
"Do You Feel It?"	19 April 2010	A–Z Volume 1 CD	
"Kamakura"	7 April 2010	A–Z Volume 1 CD (Japanese edition)	The two track were made available for free at UK April/May 2010 performances on limited handmade CDs, they were not made available online due to contract reasons.
"Disenchanted"	7 April 2010	A–Z Volume 1 CD (Japanese edition)	The two track were made available for free at UK April/May 2010 performances on limited handmade CDs, they were not made available online due to contract reasons.
"Pirates Are So 2004"	4 May 2010	Free digital download	Fifth free B-side to the A–Z Series, released to all those subscribed to the A–Z Series before midnight 29 April 2010.
"No Heartbreaker"	1 June 2010	Free digital download	Sixth free B-side to the A–Z Series, released to all those subscribed to the A–Z Series before midnight 1 June 2010. In addition, released as a free download on 10 November 2010 as part of the Shepherd's Bush Empire Free Download EP
"Lights Out"	6 July 2010	Free digital download	Seventh free B-side to the A–Z Series, released to all those subscribed to the A–Z Series before midnight 6 July 2010.
"Midnight Militia"	28 July 2010	Free digital download	Eighth free B-side to the A–Z Series, released to all those subscribed to the A–Z Series before midnight 28 July 2010.
"Replicants"	24 August 2010	Free digital download	Ninth free B-side to the A–Z Series, released to all those subscribed to the A–Z Series before midnight 24 August 2010.
"Nouvelles Aventures"	22 September 2010	Free digital download	Tenth (and final) free B-side to the A–Z Series, released to all those subscribed to the A–Z Series before midnight 22 September 2010.
"Teenage Wildlife"	11 October 2010	A–Z Volume 2 CD	
"Spellbound"	11 October 2010	A–Z Volume 2 CD	
"Nightfall"	11 October 2010	A–Z Volume 2 CD	
"Running to the Ocean"	11 October 2010	A–Z Volume 2 CD (Japanese edition)	
"Midnight in the Garden"	11 October 2010	A–Z Volume 2 CD (Japanese edition)	

=== Remixes ===
Song	Date	Release	Details
"Return of the White Rabbit" (Jaymo & Andy George Remix)	12 October 2009 digital download 7 April 2010; CD	Rehash EP; A–Z Volume 1 CD (Japanese edition)	
"True Love 1980" (Loverush UK! Remix)	12 October 2009 digital download 7 April 2010; CD	Rehash EP; A–Z Volume 1 CD (Japanese edition)	
"True Love 1980" (Pete Doyle's Rocksolid Remix)	12 October 2009 digital download 7 April 2010; CD	Rehash EP; A–Z Volume 1 CD (Japanese edition)	
"True Love 1980" (Timothy Allan Remix)	12 October 2009 digital download 7 April 2010; CD	Rehash EP; A–Z Volume 1 CD (Japanese edition)	
"Space Reshot" (Pete Doyle's Rocksolid Vocal Mix)	18 January 2010 digital download 7 April 2010; CD	Space Reshot EP; A–Z Volume 1 CD (Japanese edition)	
"Space Reshot" (Snitch Brothers Vocal Remix)	18 January 2010 digital download 7 April 2010; CD	Space Reshot EP; A–Z Volume 1 CD (Japanese edition)	
"Space Reshot" (Snitch Brothers Instrumental Remix)	18 January 2010 digital download 7 April 2010; CD	Space Reshot EP; A–Z Volume 1 CD (Japanese edition)	
"Space Reshot" (Loverush UK! Dubstrumental)	18 January 2010 digital download 7 April 2010; CD	Space Reshot EP; A–Z Volume 1 CD (Japanese edition)	
"Space Reshot" (Pete Doyle's Rocksolid Instrumental Mix)	18 January 2010 digital download 7 April 2010; CD	Space Reshot EP; A–Z Volume 1 CD (Japanese edition)	
"Space Reshot" (Loverush UK! Club Mix)	18 January 2010 digital download 7 April 2010; CD	Space Reshot EP; A–Z Volume 1 CD (Japanese edition)	
"Neon" (Beatcave Remix)	7 April 2010	A–Z Volume 1 CD (Japanese edition)	
"True Love 1980" (Vince Clarke Remix)	7 April 2010	A–Z Volume 1 CD (Japanese edition)	
"Dare to Dream" (Mogwai Remix)	12 April 2010	1000 limited vinyl Free digital download	1000 vinyl copies were pressed to celebrate Record Store Day, it was also made available for free for subscribers of the A–Z Series.

=== Acoustic ===
Song	Date	Release	Details
"True Love 1980" (acoustic)	19 April 2010 digital download	A–Z Acoustic download EP	Acoustic studio tracks
"Joy Kicks Darkness" (acoustic)	19 April 2010 digital download	A–Z Acoustic download EP	Acoustic studio tracks
"Arcadia" (acoustic)	19 April 2010 digital download	A–Z Acoustic download EP	Acoustic studio tracks
"Tracers" (acoustic) (featuring Emmy the Great)	19 April 2010 digital download	A–Z Acoustic download EP	Acoustic studio tracks
"Spaceshot" (acoustic)	19 April 2010 digital download	A–Z Acoustic download EP	Acoustic studio tracks
"Command" (acoustic)	19 April 2010 digital download	A–Z Acoustic download EP	Acoustic studio tracks
"War with Me" (acoustic)	19 April 2010 digital download	A–Z Acoustic download EP	Acoustic studio tracks

=== Live tracks ===
Song	Date	Release	Details
"Space Shot" (live)	17 April 2010 digital download	Free digital download	Live tracks recorded on the band's 2009 A–Z Tour, used in the "A for Ash" tour documentary on A–Z Volume 1.
"Arcadia" (live)	17 April 2010 digital download	Free digital download	Live tracks recorded on the band's 2009 A–Z Tour, used in the "A for Ash" tour documentary on A–Z Volume 1.

== Personnel ==
Over the course of the A–Z Series Tim Wheeler took on much of the production work himself, assisted by Cladius Mittendorfer who worked with the band on previous albums Meltdown and Twilight of the Innocents as a studio engineer and later a producer, and Ash members Mark Hamilton and Rick McMurray. Musically the band collaborated with few others; a saxophone player–Daniel Rouleau on "Do You Feel It?" a B-side released on A–Z Volume 1, Pete Moses, James Levy and Eric Feigenbaum who provided backing vocals on "Return of White Rabbit" and "Ichiban", and later Emma-Lee Moss of Emmy The Great on an acoustic studio re-recording of single "D"–"Tracers".

Emmy the Great collaborated with Ash on an acoustic version of "Tracers" released on the band's A–Z Volume 1 compilation, whilst Russell Lissack of Bloc Party joined the band on their US, Japanese and UK tour dates in 2010 as a guitarist and synthesizer player.

Ash

- Tim Wheeler – Vocals, guitar, piano and programming
- Mark Hamilton – Bass, synthesizer, backing vocals on "Ichiban" and "Return of White Rabbit"
- Rick McMurray – Drums and percussion

=== Production ===
- Tim Wheeler – Producer, additional engineer
- Cladius Mittendorfer – Co-producer, engineer, mixing
- Mark Hamilton – Co-producer
- Rick McMurray – Co-producer
- Brain Thorn – Piano assistant
- Kabir Hermon – Piano assistant
- Mike Marsh – Mastering

=== Additional musicians ===
- Eric Feigenbaum – backing vocals on "Return of White Rabbit" and "Ichiban"
- James Levy – backing vocals on "Return of White Rabbit"
- Pete Moses – backing vocals on "Ichiban"
- Daniel Rouleau – saxophone on "Do You Feel It?"
- Emma-Lee Moss – guitar, vocals on "Tracers" (acoustic)

Art

- Nico Jones – A–Z Volume 1 photography
- Post 98 – A–Z Volume 1 design and layout
- Modo Production Ltd – A–Z Volume 1 design and layout
- Steve Timmis – web development and maintenance; digital distribution

=== Live ===
For 2009 live performances, many new tracks simply used a backing track, instead of enlisting another member, but the band had not ruled out either recruiting a completely new member, or reuniting with former guitarist Charlotte Hatherley in the future, with Tim stating "I do miss her as a friend on tour" as well as stating "It could be good to get someone in for extra guitar and keyboards and add some layers" whilst Charlotte in interview with NME simply said it would be a "possibility in the future" and that her and Tim regularly talk despite her having left the band in 2006.

Tim Wheeler and Emmy The Great performed the track "Tracers" acoustically on a number of occasions in 2009, and for the 2010 release of A–Z Volume 1 an acoustic re-recording of "Tracers" was included featuring Emma-Lee Moss. The collaboration came after Emmy The Great covered "Burn Baby Burn" as a B-side to the single "First Love", famously including the backing vocals "shit! You're a shit! You're not a shit! Lick my shit".

On 16 March Russell Lissack was announced as the band's touring guitarist and synthesizer player for their tour dates in New York, Japan and the United Kingdom, Tim Wheeler stated on the band's website,

We first met at the South By South West in 2005, we'd heard he and Kele Okereke met when Russell was playing Ash songs at a party, so we've always felt that connection with him. We've loved Bloc Party since their first single and have always really admired his guitar playing.

This came after Russell's band Bloc Party went on hiatus at the end of 2009, NME quoted Russell saying "as soon as they called me I was really excited".
