= Rory McConnell =

British DJ

- Presenting career
- Show: BBC Introducing in Northern Ireland with Rory McConnell
- Station: BBC Radio 1
- Time slot: 12 – 2 am Sunday night/Monday morning
- Country: United Kingdom
- Previous show: Across The Line
- Website: www.bbc.co.uk/radio1/rorymcconnell

Rory McConnell is a DJ and radio presenter for BBC Radio 1. He previously presented the Northern Ireland edition of BBC Introducing, a regionalised radio programme transmitted Belfast from midnight to 2 am on Sunday night/Monday morning.

== Biography ==
McConnell is from Belfast. At 16, he joined the BBC Radio Ulster show, Across The Line, answering the phones. He later went on to co-present the show. In 2004 he moved to Radio 1 and then in February 2006 he began presenting Radio 1's Northern Ireland Show from 8 to 10 pm on Thursday nights. He currently presents and produces the Northern Ireland edition of the BBC Introducing show.

Rory currently runs the promotions, management and record label Di Di Mau. In the past has staged concerts in Belfast and has released the debut album from Dutch Schultz through Di Di Mau Records.
