= Renegade Cavalcade =

Single by Ash

from the album Meltdown
- Released: 6 December 2004
- Length: 3:26
- Label: Infectious
- Songwriter(s): Tim Wheeler
- Producer(s): Nick Raskulinecz

Ash singles chronology
"Starcrossed" (2004)	"Renegade Cavalcade" (2004)	"You Can't Have It All" (2007)

"Renegade Cavalcade" is a song by Northern Irish band Ash from their fourth studio album, Meltdown (2004). The song peaked at number 33 on the UK Singles Charts when released in December 2004.

== Track listings ==
CD 1

1. "Renagade Cavalcade"
2. "We Don't Care"
3. "Shockwave"

CD 2

1. "Renagade Cavalcade"
2. "We Don't Care"

7-inch gatefold

1. "Renegade Cavalcade"
2. "Shockwave"
