= Twilight of the Innocents =

Studio album by Ash
- Released: 2 July 2007
- Recorded: June 2006–January 2007
- Studio: Bang, Capitol
- Genre: Pop, power pop
- Length: 51:26
- Label: Infectious
- Producer: Tim Wheeler

Ash chronology
Meltdown (2004)	Twilight of the Innocents (2007)	A–Z Series (2009–10)

Singles from Twilight of the Innocents
- 1. "You Can't Have It All" Released: 16 April 2007; 2. "Polaris" Released: 18 June 2007; 3. "End of the World" Released: 10 September 2007

Twilight of the Innocents is the fifth studio album by Northern Irish rock band Ash. It was released on 2 July 2007, through Infectious Records. Following the departure of guitarist Charlotte Hatherley in early 2006, the band began recording their next album in New York City at Bang Studios, which they had leased from a friend of a friend. Frontman Tim Wheeler produced the recordings, with bassist Mark Hamilton and drummer McMurray acting as associate producers. Described as a pop and power pop album, Twilight of the Innocents placed emphasis on Hamilton's bass parts.

Preceded by a UK tour in early 2007, "You Can't Have It All" was released as the lead single in April 2007. The second single "Polaris" appeared in mid June, prior to the album. The band promoted it with four consecutive shows at the Koko in London, before headlining the Rip Curl Boardmasters 07 festival, and appearing at the Reading and Leeds Festivals. "End of the World" was released as the third single in September, which was followed by a UK. In 2008, the band toured Japan, played a one-off show in New York, performed at Download Festival, and headlined the Ben and Jerry's Sundae festival

Twilight of the Innocents received generally positive reviews from music critics, some of whom commented highlighted the use of strings, and the band's consistent writing. The album peaked at number 26 in Ireland, and number 32 in the UK. All of the singles charted in the UK, with "You Can't Have It All" reaching the highest at number 16.

== Background and production ==
Ash released their fourth studio album, Meltdown, in May 2004. To promote the album, the band went on headlining tours in Europe, the United Kingdom and the United States, as well as supporting the Darkness and U2. A few months after the album's release, the band toyed with the idea of releasing an acoustic album as a stop-gap release until their next studio album, which they aimed to record by mid 2005. During 2005, frontman Tim Wheeler and bassist Mark Hamilton moved from London to New York City, while drummer Rick McMurray remained in Edinburgh, Scotland. For the rest of the year, Wheeler and Hamilton worked on new material for their next release.

On 20 January 2006, guitarist Charlotte Hatherley left the band. Wheeler stated in 2007 that it was the band's decision for Hatherley to leave, as she wished to be a solo artist while also remain in the band, where he "could tell her heart wasn't in it". By June 2006, the band were recording their new album in New York City, working with 27 potential ideas for songs. The sessions were held at Bang Studios, a studio the band leased from a friend of a friend; Wheeler served as the producer, with Hamilton and McMurray acting as associate producers. Claudius Mittendorfer, James Brown, Jon Kaplan, and Dan Myers acted as engineers. In September, the band played their first gig in over a year, and their first since returning to a three-piece. The show was held in New York City, and featured the debut of two new songs.

Out of 30 tracks, the band opted to record 14 of them. By October 2006, they had finished 13 of the songs, and had planned to re-do two of them, spending 12 hours per day in the studio. In November, Wheeler was recording his vocals, while also re-working the lyrics for every song. Strings were recorded by Steve Churchyard at Capitol Studios in Los Angeles, California. Recording was completed by January 2007, and Michael H. Brauer was brought in to mix the tracks at Quad Studios in New York City. He was assisted Will Hensley, who also acts as the Pro Tools engineer. Chris Athens mastered the recordings at Sterling Sound, also in New York City.

== Composition ==
Musically, the sound of Twilight of the Innocents has been described as pop, and power pop. It had an increased emphasis on Hamilton's basslines as there was more room for his instrument due to the decision to return to a three-piece. As a result, Hamilton had to be more creative with his bass playing, Paul Buckmaster arranged and conducted the strings heard throughout the album. The Nerve writer Adam Simpkins compared it to the band's debut studio album, 1977 (1996), "in that the songs are crisp, overflowing with emotional angst and sing-a-long choruses. The album opens with the indie rock track "I Started a Fire", and is followed by the indie-disco song "You Can't Have It All", which features flamenco guitar parts. Wheeler called it a "bitchy love song" that deals with "bi-polar emotions." The guitar riffs in "Blacklisted" recalled the hair metal flourishes of Meltdown.

The piano-driven string ballad "Polaris" channels the sound of Coldplay and Feeder. Wheeler wrote the hook while at a villa in France belonging to U2; it opens with a demo recording of the song. "Palace of Excess" sees Wheeler singing in falsetto during the chorus sections, and incorporates electronic touches. The stadium rock song "End of the World" talks about light pollution, and followed by the ska-esque "Ritual". The Brill Building-like "Shadows" is followed by the pop punk track "Princess Six". The former details the aftermath of a break up. "Dark and Stormy" is a garage rock song with a Strokes-indebted bass part. "Shattered Glass" is done in the vein of the Foo Fighters and Manic Street Preachers. The album closes with the progressive rock-influenced "Twilight of the Innocents", which features Muse-styled drum parts, electronic flourishes and a string section. The track started as a few loops that were later turned, after some editing and parts being moved around, into the final version over the course of six months.

== Release ==
In February and March 2007, the band embarked on the High Education UK tour. On 23 February, "I Started a Fire" was posted online as a free download. On 29 March, Twilight of the Innocents was announced for release in July; in the month leading up to the announcement, the band held an online game of hangman in an attempt for fans to guess the title. The following week, the band posted the album's track listing online. "You Can't Have It All" was released as a single on 16 April. The CD version featured "Saskia", while the digital version included acoustic and demos versions of "You Can't Have It All". In May and June, the band appeared at the Isle of Skye and Isle of Wight Festivals.

Preceded by three Ireland shows, "Polaris" was released on 18 June 2007. The CD version featured "Come on Over", while the digital version included the demo and remix versions of "Polaris". Twilight of the Innocents was released on 2 July 2007 through Infectious Records; the band viewed it as their last album, with Wheeler explaining that "you find yourself waiting six months between finishing a record and releasing it. ... [W]e can record a track and release it the next day if we feel like it". In 2016, Wheeler revealed it was more so to break out of the "album-tour-album-tour cycle". Two versions were released in Japan, one with "Saskia", and the other with "Saskia" and a bonus live disc.

To promote its release, the Ash performed four consecutive shows at the Koko in London. In August, the band headlined the Rip Curl Boardmasters 07 festival, and performed at the Reading and Leeds Festivals. "End of the World" was released on 10 September 2007; the CD version featured "Seventh Circle", "Wasted on You", and "Statis in Darkness". Two versions were released on 7" vinyl, one with "Suicide Girls", and the other with "Shattered Glass". In October and November, the band embarked on a tour of the UK. In March 2008, the band went on a brief tour of Japan, before playing a one-off show in New York City on St. Patrick's Day. In June and July, they appeared at Download Festival, and headlined the Ben and Jerry's Sundae festival in July.

"You Can't Have It All" and "Twilight of the Innocents" were included on the band's second and third compilation albums, The Best of Ash (2011) and Teenage Wildlife: 25 Years of Ash (2020). Twilight of the Innocents was reissued on CD through BMG in 2019.

== Reception ==
Professional ratings
Aggregate scores
Source	Rating
Metacritic	70/100
Review scores
Source	Rating
AllMusic	3.5/5 stars
Drowned in Sound	7/10
The Guardian	3/5 stars
Hot Press	Favourable
The Line of Best Fit	60%
musicOMH	3/5 stars
NME	7/10
Pitchfork	7.1/10
Stylus Magazine	B
Yahoo! Music	6/10 stars

Twilight of the Innocents was met with generally positive reviews from music critics. At Metacritic, the album received an average score of 70, based on 9 reviews.

Stylus Magazine writer Nick Southall wrote that beside "a few clichéd song titles and lyrics", Twilight of the Innocents "demonstrates a refreshing maturity and breadth". He called it "a fine record even if it’s not their best." Hot Press's Kilian Murphy wrote that the band "successfully re-ignited their creative spark", marking a "welcome return to form." Daniel Martin of NME called the album a "reassuringly pop collection" that was "stretched out with strings and emotion", and added that it was "an artistic watermark" for the band. Pitchfork contributor Joe Tangari wrote that apart from the first two songs, "you couldn't mistake this for anybody but Ash." He went on further to state that some of tracks "go a little too far with the crunching stop-start bits and displays of power, at the expense of songwriting, ... but otherwise, this is a good album".

Drowned in Sound's Mike Haydock said the album was "surprisingly, frustratingly, bafflingly good", complete with "fresh and consistent" tracks. He added that Wheeler's voice is "still woefully uncharismatic, ... [though] he should have pruned a couple of songs here rather than over-stretching to 12 songs." AllMusic reviewer Jon O'Brien wrote that the album "focuses on a mature, emotive, and cinematic direction which showcases ... Wheeler's underrated songwriting abilities." Though he said Wheeler's "lackluster vocals remain a constant hindrance, his thin, reedy tones often struggling to make any impact", it was overall a "reassuringly strong collection of potential hits ... it's a pretty accomplished swansong."

The Line of Best Fit writer Rich Hughes said the majority of the tracks were "drenched in stacks of production", complete with "[s]trings, sirens and layered guitars ... [that] take the edge off proceedings." He added that if the band paired the album down "then maybe we’d have something more interesting, as it is, this is merely OK." Vik Bansal of musicOMH found the band to be leaving "behind the supercharged rock tendencies" of their past album, and "instead return to more mid-paced musical matters." The Guardian's Dorian Lynskey called it "far more adventurous than one might expect", and upon highlighting the strings and piano, he stated that the "wheel remains un-reinvented, but at least it has acquired a new lick of paint." Yahoo! Music writer Adam Webb viewed the album as "a pretty bog-standard Ash collection, nothing more, nothing less." In a similar sentiment, Simpkins said: "Like the last few albums by Weezer, Twilight's tracks all follow the same stale formula with a painfully unoriginal production".

Twilight of the Innocents entered the charts at number 26 in Ireland, and number 32 in the UK. "You Can't Have It All" charted at number 16 in the UK. "Polaris" charted at number 32 in the UK. "End of the World" charted at number 62 in the UK.

== Track listing ==
All songs were written by Tim Wheeler.

1. "I Started a Fire" – 4:25
2. "You Can't Have It All" – 3:35
3. "Blacklisted" – 3:46
4. "Polaris" – 4:32
5. "Palace of Excess" – 3:38
6. "End of the World" – 4:20
7. "Ritual" – 3:43
8. "Shadows" – 3:55
9. "Princess Six" – 3:54
10. "Dark and Stormy" – 4:15
11. "Shattered Glass" – 5:02
12. "Twilight of the Innocents" – 6:21

== Personnel ==
Personnel per booklet.

Ash

- Tim Wheeler – vocals, guitars, keyboards, programming
- Mark Hamilton – bass
- Rick McMurray – drums, percussion

Additional musicians

- Paul Buckmaster – string arrangements, conductor

Producer

- Tim Wheeler – producer, engineer
- Mark Hamilton – associate producer, art direction
- Rick McMurray – associate producer
- Claudius Mittendorfer – engineer
- James Brown – engineer
- Jon Kaplan – engineer
- Dan Myers – engineer
- Steve Churchyard – strings recording
- Michael H. Brauer – mixing
- Will Hensley – mixing assistant, Pro Tools engineer
- Chris Athens – mastering
- B+ – photography
- Mark Caylor – art direction

== Charts ==
Chart performance for Twilight of the Innocents
Chart (2007)	Peak position
Irish Albums (IRMA)	26
UK Albums (OCC)	32
