= Meltdown (Ash album) =

Studio album by Ash
- Released: 17 May 2004
- Recorded: October 2003–January 2004
- Studios: Sound City, Van Nuys, California; Chalice, Hollywood, California
- Genre: Hard rock
- Length: 42:24
- Labels: Infectious, Home Grown
- Producers: Nick Raskulinecz, Ash

Ash chronology
Intergalactic Sonic 7″s (2002)	Meltdown (2004)	Twilight of the Innocents (2007)

Singles from Meltdown
- 1. "Clones" Released: 25 February 2004; 2. "Orpheus" Released: 3 May 2004; 3. "Starcrossed" Released: 19 July 2004; 4. "Renegade Cavalcade" Released: 6 December 2004; 5. "Meltdown" Released: 24 May 2005

Meltdown is the fourth studio album to be recorded by the Northern Irish rock band Ash. The album was released on 17 May 2004 through Infectious Records and Home Grown. Following the success of their third studio album Free All Angels (2001), Ash debuted several new songs while touring throughout 2003. By October that year, they had travelled to Los Angeles, California, to record a follow-up album, which was co-produced by Nick Raskulinecz and the band. Recording sessions were held at Sound City Studios in Van Nuys and at Chalice Studios, Hollywood. Meltdown, which is described as a hard rock album, drew comparisons to the work of The Smashing Pumpkins and critics said the guitar work resembles that of Black Sabbath and Metallica.

The album's lead single "Clones" was released in late February 2004, coinciding with a European tour and a UK club tour. The second single "Orpheus" was released in May to accompany another UK tour. "Starcrossed" was the third single; it was released that July. During the next few months, Ash appeared at the Reading and Leeds Festivals, embarked on a European tour, and supported the Darkness on their UK tour. With the release of the fourth single "Renegade Cavalcade" in December, the band twice toured Japan and the US; the second stint coincided with the release of the fifth single "Meltdown" in May 2005.

Meltdown received generally positive reviews from music critics, some of whom commented on the band members' musicianship. The album peaked at number five in the UK and Scotland, and at number six in Ireland. It also charted in Australia, Austria, Germany, and Norway. Meltdown was certified gold in the UK. All of the singles except for "Meltdown" reached the top 40 in the UK and Ireland; "Clones" was the best-selling single, peaking at number 12 in Ireland.

== Background and production ==
In April 2001, Ash released their third studio album Free All Angels, which was a commercial success, saving the band from the brink of bankruptcy. It reached number one in the UK and spawned five UK top 40 singles. As early as August 2001, the band were pondering what to do for their next album. When touring the US, they listened to a lot of rock radio. Frontman Tim Wheeler wanted the follow-up to be a heavy rock album with similarities to Guns N' Roses' Appetite for Destruction (1987) and Nirvana's Nevermind (1991). In September 2002, Ash released their first compilation album Intergalactic Sonic 7″s, which they promoted with a three-month supporting US tour with Saves the Day. Wheeler wrote 14 new songs after attending a February 2003 peace march.

In March 2003, Wheeler told the NME he wanted to experiment with electronic music for the band's next album after using computers to score a short film. In May and June 2003, Ash embarked on their first headlining US tour in five years. Throughout the year, the band debuted several new songs. In October, Ash went to Los Angeles, California, to record their next album, staying at Julia Roberts' former home in Beverly Hills. Recording sessions were held at Sound City Studios in Van Nuys and at Chalice Studios in Hollywood; recordings were co-produced by Ash and Nick Raskulinecz. Ash worked with Raskulinecz at the recommendation of Andy Gill from Gang of Four, who told Wheeler he "got the best drum sound he's ever heard" from using Raskulinecz.

The band also chose to work with Nick Raskulinecz because they wanted the album to have an American sound to it; according to Wheeler, American-made albums "sound better sonically", with "better engineering, better studios, so we wanted to check it out firsthand." Wheeler said they recorded guitar, vocals, drums and bass in that order, which contrasted with their usual method of recording bass and drums first. Foo Fighters frontman Dave Grohl visited the studio a few times during the recording but the band refrained from asking him to play on any recordings; Wheeler said; "There's a whole bunch of people we could have called, but we just want to get our band's sound on record". Despite planning to have finished by November, the sessions continued until January 2004. Rich Costey mixed the recordings at Cello Studios, also in Hollywood, with assistance from Claudius Mittendorfer. Howie Weinberg mastered the album at Masterdisk.

At some point during the writing and production of Meltdown the band was also approached for a partnership by LucasArts for the video game Star Wars: Republic Commando. The song "Clones" is featured in the credits of Republic Commando, becoming the first licensed song in the Star Wars franchise.

== Composition ==
Meltdown has been described as a hard rock album that has influences from metal and has been compared with the works of Smashing Pumpkins. The guitar work throughout the album is similar to that of Black Sabbath and Metallica, and includes numerous solos played by Ash's guitarist Charlotte Hatherley. Meltdown is a departure from the pop punk style of Free All Angels, and is the band's heaviest-sounding release. Discussing the album's title, Wheeler said; "Why? Cos it's a meltdown. A full-on rock monster. A real face-melter. It'll tear your face off." Wheeler wrote all of the songs except "Meltdown" – which he co-wrote with Hatherley – and "Out of the Blue", which he co-wrote with bassist Mark Hamilton. Dracula is a reoccurring lyrical theme on the album.

The opening track "Meltdown" is a political piece that channels the sound of AC/DC and Foo Fighters. Wheeler wrote it after witnessing a peace demonstration and Hatherley wrote the middle eight guitar riff. "Orpheus" switches between indie pop and heavy rock, and the verses include Wheeler's 1970s metal-style guitar riffs. Wheeler said the lyrics were taken from the eponymous Greek myth and is about the death of his friend's mother. "Evil Eye" is a slower track on which Wheeler and Hatherley trade vocals that tells the story of a female suitor. It features a backwards message that says "She's giving me the Evil Eye. Suck Satan's cock." Wheeler said "Clones" is about the homogenization of mankind, and is "a rant about some person who's let you down, a person you thought was different and they turn out to be the same as everyone else". The song has an instrumental break section that was influenced by the works of Rage Against the Machine.

"Starcrossed" is a string-led power ballad that is reminiscent of the material on Free All Angels. It re-tells the story of Romeo and Juliet. "Out of the Blue" evokes "Song 2" (1997) by Blur and "Surf Wax America" (1994) by Weezer. Wheeler said the final version of "Out of the Blue" is the result of merging two separate songs. "Renegade Cavalcade" features staccato guitar parts during the verses. "Detonator" utilizes the talking guitar in vein of Peter Frampton during the verse sections; it is followed by the Foo Fighters-esque "On a Wave". "Won't Be Saved" is similar to the band's earlier material and was nearly left off the final version of the album but the band's agent persuaded them to keep it. "Vampire Love", which has Placebo-like lyrics and a cello part played by Oli Kraus, closes the album.

== Release ==
On 29 January 2004, Meltdown was announced for release later that year. "Clones" was released as the album's lead single on 25 February as a download-only single. The song's music video, which was filmed in the basement of a house in London, was directed by Jeff T. Thomas and premiered on MTV2 on 26 February. The band's US label Kinetic Records was dissolved on 26 March; the band's manager was in talks in an attempt to release the album in that territory later in the year. On 3 May, "Orpheus" was released as a single; the CD version includes "Everybody's Happy Nowadays" (with Chris Martin of Coldplay) and "Tinsel Town".

Meltdown was released through Infectious Records and Home Grown on 17 May 2004. The album's cover shows a tattoo-styled phoenix rising from flames. Its booklet features liner notes written by author JT LeRoy. A special-edition double CD version, the second disk containing live recordings from Ash's UK tour earlier in the year, was released in the UK. Two versions were released in Japan; one that added "Tinsel Town" and "Everybody's Happy Nowadays" to the main album and the other added extra live recordings to the UK special-edition live disc.

Ash promoted the UK release with a series of in-store signings. "Starcrossed" was released as a single on 19 July 2004; the CD version includes "Cool It down" and "Solace". The song's music video is a homage to Romeo + Juliet (1996) and was filmed in a church in Bucharest, Romania. "Renegade Cavalcade" was released as a single on 6 December 2004; the CD version includes "We Don't Care" and the 7" vinyl version includes "Shockwave". The song was initially planned for released in November but was postponed because in Ash's absence, their record label made a video for it, which the band disliked. A second video showcasing a performance of the band was made.

On 8 February 2005, Ash released an Extended Play (EP) called Commando, which includes "Meltdown", "Clones", "Evil Eye", and "Tinstle Town". Meltdown was released in the US on 8 March through the label Record Collection to coincide with the band's US tour. The US version includes the bonus tracks "Shockwave", "Solace", and "Cool It Down", as well as a DVD of music videos. The title-track "Meltdown" was released to American radio stations on 24 May.

"Orpheus", "Clones", and "Starcrossed" were included on Ash's second compilation album The Best of Ash (2011). "Orpheus" and "Clones" were released on 7" vinyl as part of '94–'04 The 7" Singles Box Set (2019). "Orpheus", "Clones", and "Starcrossed" were also included on the band's third compilation album Teenage Wildlife: 25 Years of Ash (2020). Meltdown was reissued on CD through BMG in 2018.

== Touring ==
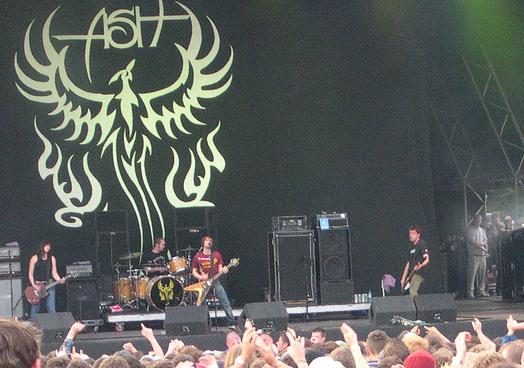
Ash performing at Leeds Festival

In February and March 2004, Ash embarked on a tour of Europe and then a club tour of the UK. The following month, the band appeared at the Skate and Surf Festival, and headlined BBC Radio 1's Big Weekend. On 2 May, the band headlined one of the stages at the Coachella Festival. In May and June, Ash went on another UK tour with support from Saves the Day and The Crimea. In August, the band appeared at the Reading and Leeds Festivals, and in October and November, they again toured Europe. Ash supported the Darkness' arena tour in December.

At the start of 2005, Ash toured Japan, and in March and April that year, they embarked on a headlining US tour with support from the Bravery. While touring the US in June, the band were travelling to San Francisco when their bus caught fire; while they waited on the roadside for a new bus, the band received a call telling them the replacement bus had also caught fire. Ash drove themselves to a show in a van and borrowed equipment from The Bravery. In July, the band supported U2 for three shows in Europe.

== Reception ==
Professional ratings
Aggregate scores
Source	Rating
Metacritic	78/100
Review scores
Source	Rating
AllMusic	4/5 stars
Drowned in Sound	8/10
Entertainment.ie	4/5 stars
The Guardian	3/5 stars
IGN	8.2/10
Melodic	3/5 stars
Pitchfork	6.8/10
PopMatters	6/10
Stylus Magazine	C+
Yahoo! Launch	8/10 stars

Meltdown received generally positive reviews from music critics. At Metacritic, the album received an average score of 78 based on 16 reviews.

AllMusic reviewer Jason Damas wrote Meltdown is "burst[ing] with the hooks and little musical flourishes that have made the more mature Ash records such a treat" with minimal "meandering malaise" that plagues the band's second album, Nu-Clear Sounds (1998). He added it is a "surprisingly strong and assured record" that would enhance the band's legacy. Yahoo! Launch writer Emma Morgan said the album "sounds exactly like what it is – a post-pubescent take" on the band's debut studio album 1977 (1996). She also called the album a "sturdy, well-written and ... mature addition to Ash's enduring and near-essential canon". JR of IGN said Meltdown is "every bit as good as you'd hoped it would be", providing "on enough levels to accept the invitation into your stereo ... and your brain". Drowned in Sound founder Sean Adams called it a "combo of Ash of all ages ... This is the kinda rock record us malnourished Brits can be proud of. It's Ash being Ash". Andrew Unterberger of Stylus Magazine said the album's metal influence delivers "enough to give the album a bit of personality and distinctiveness without totally overpowering the band's signature sound".

Entertainment.ie reviewer Andrew Lynch wrote Meltdown is "by far the heaviest-sounding album they've made to date, sometimes a bit too heavy for Tim Wheeler's slightly weedy voice". He added, "for all the bulldozer riffs and ferocious guitar solos on display here, the superb melodies prove that they're still just a great pop band at heart". Mikael Wood of The Boston Phoenix said the band "punch up the guitars and drums until they threaten to drown out Wheeler’s voice altogether, and the thick, chewy distortion is a return to the days of Nirvana and Smashing Pumpkins". Pitchfork contributor Jason Crock noted while the album "rock[s] harder, and with more snarl" than the band's past works, they "still can't help but reveal their melodic sweet tooth". PopMatters' Adrien Begrand said the album is "slightly more consistent" than the band's previous one, highlighting Hatherley's talents as a guitarist and her vocals. The Guardian writer Steve Pill said the album is "a festival set list in waiting ... this may be the first rock album of the year you can sing in the shower and make a better hash of". Kaj Roth of Melodic wrote the band "cranked up the volume to 11 and then just rocked", and called it one of the better albums of the year as well as "one of the most fun to listen to".

Meltdown entered the charts at number five in the UK, number five in Scotland, and number six in Ireland. It reached number 25 in Norway, number 65 in Germany, number 78 in Austria, and number 87 in Australia. The album was later certified gold in the UK, and ranked at number 173 on the UK year-end chart. "Clones" charted at number 12 in Ireland; "Orpheus" charted at number 13 in the UK, and number 17 in Ireland; and "Starcrossed" charted at number 19 in Ireland and number 22 in the UK. "Renegade Cavalcade" charted at number 22 in Ireland and number 33 in the UK.

== Track listing ==
All tracks written by Tim Wheeler, except where noted.

No.	Title	Writer(s)	Length
1.	"Meltdown"	Tim Wheeler; Charlotte Hatherley	3:24
2.	"Orpheus"		4:16
3.	"Evil Eye"		3:26
4.	"Clones"		4:00
5.	"Starcrossed"		4:50
6.	"Out of the Blue"	Wheeler; Mark Hamilton	3:24
7.	"Renegade Cavalcade"		3:26
8.	"Detonator"		3:38
9.	"On a Wave"		4:27
10.	"Won't Be Saved"		3:41
11.	"Vampire Love"		3:45
Total length:			42:24

== Personnel ==
Personnel per booklet.

Ash

- Tim Wheeler – guitar, vocals
- Rick McMurray – drums
- Mark Hamilton – bass guitar, design
- Charlotte Hatherley – guitar, backing vocals, piano

Additional musicians

- Oli Kraus – cello (track 11)

Production

- Nick Raskulinecz – producer, engineer
- Ash – co–producer
- Rich Costey – mixing
- Mike Terry – recording
- Claudius Mittendorfer – mix assistant
- Miles Wilson – second engineer
- Kevin Szymanski – second engineer
- Howie Weinberg – mastering

Design

- Matt Sharp – studio photography
- Adrian Boot – band photography
- Rori Keating – Tribal illustrations
- Jim Fitzpatrick – 'Orpheus' illustration
- JT LeRoy – liner notes
- Craig Gentle – design

== Charts and certifications ==
=== Weekly charts ===
Weekly chart performance for Meltdown
Chart (2004)	Peak position
Australian Albums (ARIA)	87
Austrian Albums (Ö3 Austria)	78
German Albums (Offizielle Top 100)	65
Irish Albums (IRMA)	6
Norwegian Albums (VG-lista)	25
Scottish Albums (Official Charts)	5
UK Albums (Official Charts)	5

=== Year-end charts ===
Year-end chart performance for Meltdown
Chart (2004)	Position
UK Albums (OCC)	173

=== Certifications ===
Region	Certification	Certified units/sales
United Kingdom (BPI)	Gold	100,000^{^}
^{^} Shipments figures based on certification alone.
