= Billy Ocean discography =

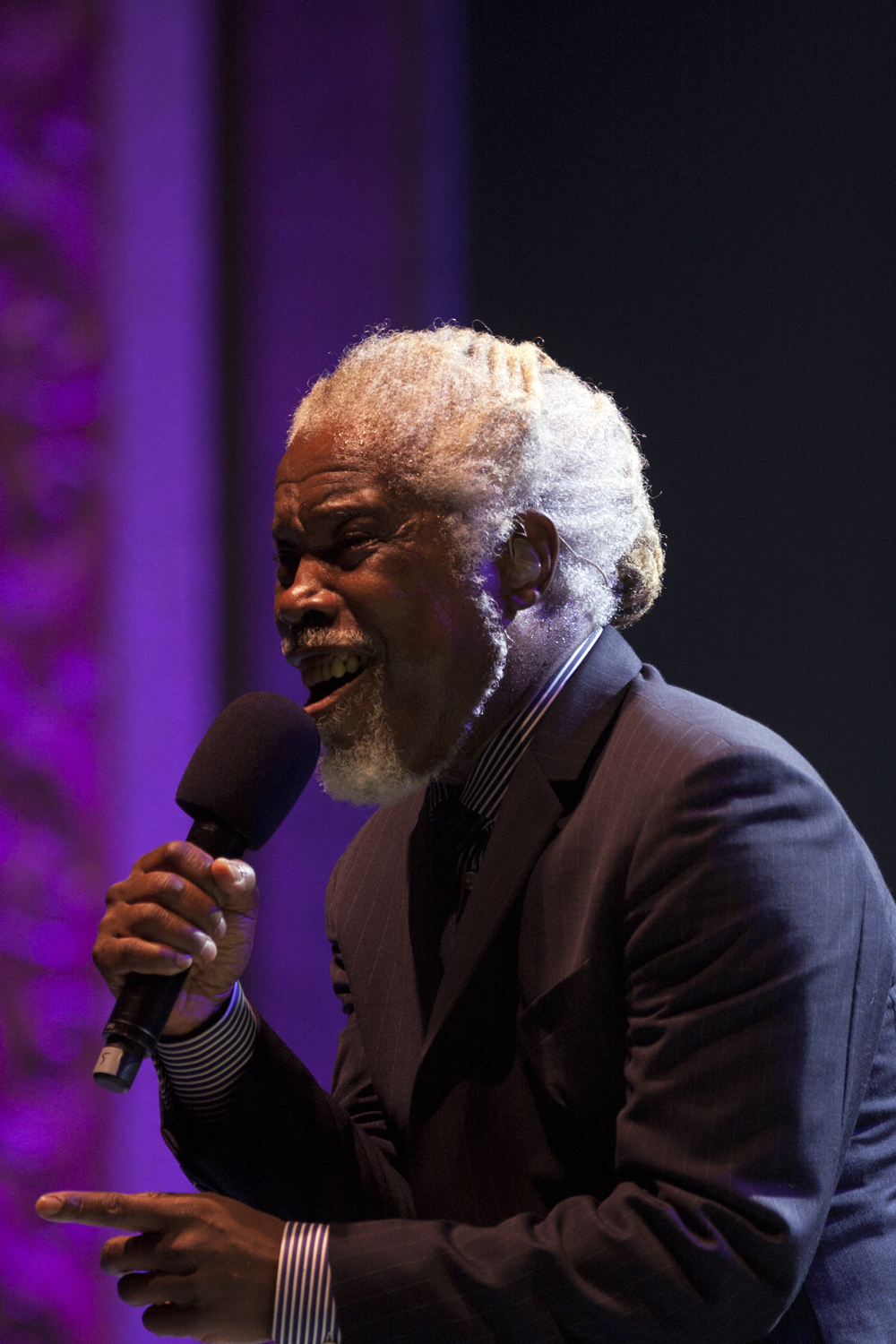
- Studio albums: 11
- Compilation albums: 15
- Singles: 46

This discography documents albums and singles released by the Trinidadian-British R&B/soul/pop singer Billy Ocean.

== Albums ==
=== Studio albums ===
Title	Details	Peak chart positions										Certifications
Title	Details	UK	AUS	CAN	FIN	GER	NLD	NZ	SWE	SWI	US	Certifications
Billy Ocean	Released: 1976; Label: GTO	—	—	—	—	—	—	—	—	—	—	
City Limit	Released: 1980; Label: GTO	—	—	—	—	—	—	—	—	—	—	
Nights (Feel Like Getting Down)	Released: 1981; Label: GTO / Epic	—	—	—	—	—	—	—	—	—	152	
Inner Feelings	Released: 1982; Label: Epic	—	—	—	—	—	—	—	—	—	—	
Suddenly	Released: 12 September 1984; Label: Jive	9	13	14	10	43	23	35	—	—	9	BPI: Gold; MC: 3× Platinum; RIAA: 2× Platinum
Love Zone	Released: 6 May 1986; Label: Jive	2	8	3	10	33	7	8	7	16	6	BPI: Gold; MC: 2× Platinum; RIAA: 2× Platinum
Tear Down These Walls	Released: 7 March 1988; Label: Jive	3	13	8	24	17	18	7	14	10	18	BPI: Gold; ARIA: Gold; MC: Platinum; RIAA: Platinum
Time to Move On	Released: 1 March 1993; Label: Jive	—	—	—	—	—	81	—	—	—	—	
Because I Love You	Released: 2 February 2009; Label: Aqua Music	—	—	—	—	—	—	—	—	—	—	
Here You Are	Released: 26 April 2013; Label: Aqua Music	—	—	—	—	—	—	—	—	—	—	
One World	Released: 4 September 2020; Label: Aqua Music/Sony	14	—	—	—	—	—	—	—	—	—	
"—" denotes the album failed to chart or was not released in that country

=== Compilation albums ===
Title	Details	Peak chart positions						Certifications
Title	Details	UK	AUS	CAN	NLD	NZ	US	Certifications
The Early Years / Emotions in Motion / Love Really Hurts Without You	Released: 1985; Label:	—	—	—	—	—	—	
Greatest Hits	Released: 16 October 1989; Label: Jive	4	14	59	60	7	77	BPI: Platinum; MC: Platinum; RIAA: Platinum
The Collection: 1976–1991 15 Years...The Story Continues	Released: February 1991; Label: Arcade	—	—	—	30	—	—	
The Best of Billy Ocean	Released: 21 November 1991 (Japan only); Label: Jive / Alfa Records	—	—	—	—	—	—	
L.I.F.E. – Love Is for Ever	Released: 4 August 1997; Label: Jive	7	123	—	70	39	—	BPI: Gold
The Billy Ocean Collection	Released: 25 November 2002; Label: Epic	—	—	—	—	—	—	
Let's Get Back Together: The Love Songs of Billy Ocean	Released: 3 February 2003; Label: Jive / BMG	69	—	—	—	—	—	
Ultimate Collection	Released: 5 June 2004; Label: Jive	28	—	—	—	—	—	BPI: Silver
The Best of Billy Ocean	Released: 26 November 2005; Label: Sony BMG	—	—	—	—	—	—	
The Best of Billy Ocean	Released: 6 June 2006; Label: Jive	—	—	—	—	—	—	
Collections	Released: 28 May 2007; Label: Sony BMG	—	—	—	—	—	—	
Super Hits	Released: 4 November 2008; Label: Sony BMG	—	—	—	—	—	—	
The Very Best of Billy Ocean	Released: 26 April 2010; Label: Sony Music	17	—	—	—	—	—	BPI: Platinum
The Real... Billy Ocean (The Ultimate Collection)	Released: 2014; Label: Sony Music / Legacy	59	—	—	—	—	—	
Here You Are: The Best of Billy Ocean	Released: 29 April 2016; Label: Sony Music	4	—	—	—	—	—	BPI: Silver
"—" denotes the album failed to chart or was not released in that country

== Singles ==
=== 1970s ===
List of singles, with selected chart positions and certifications, showing year released and album name
Title	Year	Peak chart positions									Certifications	Album
Title	Year	UK	AUS	CAN	GER	NLD	NZ	SWE	US R&B	US	Certifications	Album
"Nashville Rain" (as Les Charles)	1971	—	—	—	—	—	—	—	—	—		single only
"Reach Out a Hand" (as Les Charles)	1972	—	—	—	—	—	—	—	—	—		single only
"On the Run" (with Scorched Earth)	1974	—	—	—	—	—	—	—	—	—		single only
"Love Really Hurts Without You"	1976	2	3	21	16	11	13	9	—	22	BPI: 2× Platinum; RMNZ: Platinum	Billy Ocean
"L.O.D. (Love on Delivery)"	1976	19	95	—	30	—	12	17	55	106		Billy Ocean
"Stop Me (If You've Heard it All Before)"	1976	12	—	—	—	—	—	—	—	—		Billy Ocean
"Red Light Spells Danger"	1977	2	—	—	15	11	10	—	—	—	BPI: 2× Platinum	single only
"Let's Put Our Emotions in Motion"	1979	—	—	—	—	—	24	—	—	—		City Limit
"American Hearts"	1979	54	—	—	—	—	—	—	—	—		City Limit
"—" denotes single that did not chart or was not released

=== 1980s ===
List of singles, with selected chart positions and certifications, showing year released and album name
Title	Year	Peak chart positions										Certifications	Album
Title	Year	UK	AUS	CAN	FIN	GER	NLD	NZ	SWE	US R&B	US	Certifications	Album
"Are You Ready"	1980	42	—	—	—	37	13	—	—	—	—		City Limit
"Stay the Night"	1980	—	—	—	—	69	—	—	—	—	—		City Limit
"Nights (Feel Like Getting Down)"	1980	—	—	—	—	—	—	—	—	7	103		Nights (Feel Like Getting Down)
"Another Day Won't Matter"	1981	—	—	—	—	—	—	—	—	66	—		Nights (Feel Like Getting Down)
"Calypso Funkin' "	1982	—	—	—	—	—	—	—	—	72	—		Inner Feelings
"European Queen (No More Love on the Run)"	1984	82	—	—	—	2	21	—	—	—	—		Suddenly
"Caribbean Queen (No More Love on the Run)"	1984	6	2	1	13	—	—	1	—	1	1	BPI: Gold; MC: Gold; RIAA: Gold; RMNZ: Platinum	Suddenly
"Loverboy"	1985	15	7	6	1	12	7	7	7	20	2	MC: Gold	Suddenly
"Suddenly"	1985	4	15	7	—	50	20	38	—	5	4	BPI: Silver	Suddenly
"Mystery Lady"	1985	49	79	38	—	—	—	—	—	10	24		Suddenly
"The Long and Winding Road"	1985	—	—	—	—	—	—	—	—	—	—		Suddenly
"When the Going Gets Tough, the Tough Get Going"	1986	1	1	1	2	2	1	3	2	6	2	BPI: Platinum; RMNZ: Gold	Love Zone
"There'll Be Sad Songs (To Make You Cry)"	1986	12	10	1	18	36	13	3	—	1	1		Love Zone
"On the Run (Hold on Brother)"	1986	—	—	—	—	—	—	—	—	—	—		Emotions in Motion
"Love Zone"	1986	49	91	18	—	73	—	31	—	1	10		Love Zone
"Bittersweet"	1986	44	—	—	—	—	—	—	—	—	—		Love Zone
"Love Is Forever"	1986	34	—	35	—	—	—	—	—	10	16		Love Zone
"Love Really Hurts Without You" (1986 Dance Mix)	1986	81	—	—	—	—	98	—	—	—	—		single only
"Get Outta My Dreams, Get into My Car"	1988	3	1	1	4	3	2	2	4	1	1	BPI: Silver; ARIA: Platinum; MC: Gold; RMNZ: Platinum	Tear Down These Walls
"Calypso Crazy"	1988	35	—	—	—	—	38	36	—	—	—		Tear Down These Walls
"The Colour of Love"	1988	65	—	12	—	—	—	—	—	10	17		Tear Down These Walls
"Tear Down These Walls"	1988	—	—	—	—	—	—	—	—	27	—		Tear Down These Walls
"Stand and Deliver"	1988	97	—	—	—	—	—	—	—	—	—		Tear Down These Walls
"Licence to Chill"	1989	81	76	69	—	—	43	33	—	33	32		Greatest Hits
"—" denotes single that did not chart or was not released

=== 1990s–2010s ===
List of singles, with selected chart positions and certifications, showing year released and album name
Title	Year	Peak chart positions			Album
Title	Year	UK	NLD	US R&B	Album
"I Sleep Much Better (In Someone Else's Bed)"	1990	—	—	60	Greatest Hits
"Pressure"	1993	55	44	—	Time to Move On
"Pick Up the Pieces (Put It Back)"	1993	126	—	—	Time to Move On
"Everything's So Different Without You"	1993	—	—	91	Time to Move On
"Baby Can I Hold You?"	2003	—	—	—	Let's Get Back Together: The Love Songs of Billy Ocean
"Chained"	2008	—	—	—	single only
"Because I Love You"	2009	—	—	—	Because I Love You
"Can't Take It"	2009	—	—	—	Because I Love You
"Question Is"	2010	—	—	—	Because I Love You
"Having a Party"	2013	—	—	—	Here You Are
"Love Train"	2014	—	—	—	Here You Are
"A Simple Game"	2016	—	—	—	Here You Are: The Best of Billy Ocean
"Judge Not"	2016	—	—	—	Here You Are: The Best of Billy Ocean
"—" denotes single that did not chart or was not released

== Ocean-written songs recorded by other artists ==
- "Are You Ready?" – La Toya Jackson
- "Stay the Night" – La Toya Jackson
- "Love Is a Dangerous Game" – Millie Jackson
- "Love Is" – Randy Crawford
- "Love Really Hurts Without You" – Bad Boys Blue
- "Love Really Hurts Without You" – Ankie Bagger
- "Taking Chances" – Ray, Goodman & Brown
- "Waiting for You" – Boyzone
- "Whatever Turns You On" – The Dells
- "Who's Gonna Rock You" – The Nolans
- "Red Light Spells Danger" – Jeremy Clarkson, Richard Hammond, and James May Feat Justin Hawkins as the "Top Gear Band" on Top Gear of the Pops
- "Suddenly" – Marti Pellow
- "Get Outta My Dreams, Get into My Car" – Gwar
- "When the Going Gets Tough, the Tough Get Going" – Boyzone
