= Here You Are: The Best of Billy Ocean =

Compilation album by Billy Ocean
- Released: 29 April 2016
- Genres: R&B; pop; rock
- Length: 133:23
- Labels: Legacy; Sony; Aqua Music Group
- Producers: Barry J. Eastmond; Keith Diamond; Robert John "Mutt" Lange

Billy Ocean chronology
The Real... Billy Ocean (The Ultimate Collection) (2014)	Here You Are: The Best of Billy Ocean (2016)	Here You Are + The Music of My Life (2017)

Here You Are: The Best of Billy Ocean is a two-disc compilation album by British R&B singer and songwriter Billy Ocean, released in 2016. The first disc includes cover versions of 1950s and 1960s pop and rock songs, and the second disc includes most of Ocean's hit recordings.

== Reception ==
Professional ratings
Review scores
Source	Rating
AllMusic	4/5 stars

Ian Sime from York's The Press says Ocean's cover of "A Simple Game" is richly infused with Northern Soul angst, calling it "the perfect hit single". However, his interpretations of "A Change Is Gonna Come", "No Woman No Cry" and "Having a Party" have a "distinct air of Cabaret Classic, and the least said about his rendition of "Cry Me a River" the better."

Super Deluxe Edition's Justyn Barnes says that: "Here You Are: The Best of Billy Ocean has a rather cute cover photo of the young Leslie Charles who would grow up to become big Billy O, Grammy-award-winning artist, and the audio content of this double CD released by Sony Music CMG is designed to reflect his – as they say on X Factor – 'journey'."

== Background ==
To promote the album, Billy Ocean toured in 2016.

== Track listing ==
=== Disc one ===
No.	Title	Writer(s)	Length
1.	"A Change Is Gonna Come"	Sam Cooke	4:19
2.	"Cry Me a River"	Arthur Hamilton	4:11
3.	"No Woman, No Cry"	Bob Marley, Vincent Ford	5:25
4.	"High Tide, Low Tide"	Bob Marley	4:39
5.	"You Send Me"	Sam Cooke	4:51
6.	"Here You Are"	Billy Ocean, Barry Eastmond	4:35
7.	"A Simple Game"	Mike Pinder	5:04
8.	"It Was a Very Good Year"	Ervin Drake	5:18
9.	"Time and the River"	Wally Gold, Aaron Schaeder	3:53
10.	"Having a Party"	Sam Cooke	5:14
11.	"These Foolish Things"	Eric Maschwitz, Jack Strachey, Harry Link	4:38
12.	"Judge Not"	Bob Marley	3:31
Total length:			55:45

=== Disc two ===
No.	Title	Writer(s)	Originally from	Length
1.	"When the Going Gets Tough, the Tough Get Going"	Billy Ocean, Robert John "Mutt" Lange, Wayne Brathwaite, Barry Eastmond	The Jewel of the Nile, 1985 and Love Zone, 1986	4:10
2.	"Suddenly"	Billy Ocean, Keith Diamond	Suddenly, 1984	3:53
3.	"Get Outta My Dreams, Get Into My Car"	Billy Ocean, Robert John "Mutt" Lange	Tear Down These Walls, 1988	4:45
4.	"Caribbean Queen (No More Love on the Run)"	Billy Ocean, Keith Diamond	Suddenly	4:05
5.	"Love Really Hurts Without You"	Leslie Charles, Ben Findon	Billy Ocean, 1976	3:00
6.	"Red Light Spells Danger"	Leslie Charles, Ben Findon	Single only, 1977	3:31
7.	"Stop Me (If You've Heard It All Before)"	Leslie Charles, Ben Findon, Mike Myers	Billy Ocean	3:57
8.	"There'll Be Sad Songs (To Make You Cry)"	Billy Ocean, Wayne Brathwaite, Barry Eastmond	Love Zone	4:50
9.	"Loverboy"	Billy Ocean, Robert John "Mutt" Lange, Keith Diamond	Suddenly	4:10
10.	"L.O.D. (Love On Delivery)"	Leslie Charles, Ben Findon	Billy Ocean	2:45
11.	"The Long and Winding Road"	John Lennon, Paul McCartney	Suddenly	4:41
12.	"Love Is Forever"	Billy Ocean, Wayne Anton Brathwaite, Barry James Eastmond	Love Zone	4:10
13.	"Calypso Crazy"	Billy Ocean, Robert John "Mutt" Lange	Tear Down These Walls	4:26
14.	"Are You Ready?"	Billy Ocean, Ken Gold	City Limit, 1980	4:28
15.	"Bitter Sweet"	Billy Ocean, Wayne Anton Brathwaite, Barry James Eastmond	Love Zone	4:57
16.	"Mystery Lady"	Billy Ocean, Keith Diamond, James Woodley	Suddenly	3:55
17.	"Love Zone"	Billy Ocean, Wayne Anton Brathwaite, Barry James Eastmond	Love Zone	4:14
18.	"The Colour of Love"	Billy Ocean, Wayne Brathwaite, Barry Eastmond, Jolyon Skinner	Tear Down These Walls	4:17
19.	"Love Train"	Kenny Gamble, Leon Huff	Previously Unreleased	3:31
Total length:				1:17:54

== Charts ==
Chart (2016)	Peak position
Belgium (Ultratop)	142
UK Albums Chart (Official Charts Company)	4

== Release history ==
Region	Date	Label	Format	Catalog #
UK	22 April 2013	Aqua Music	2-CD	AQCD2
USA	2017	Legacy	CD, Album, Reissue, Compilation	88985440232
Australia	29 April 2016	Sony Music	2 × CD	88985313022
