= List of RPM number-one adult contemporary singles of 1986 =

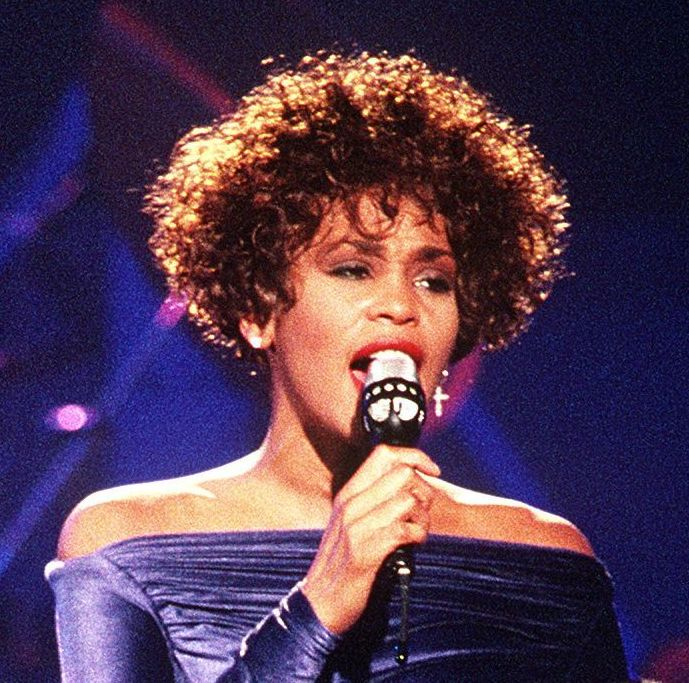
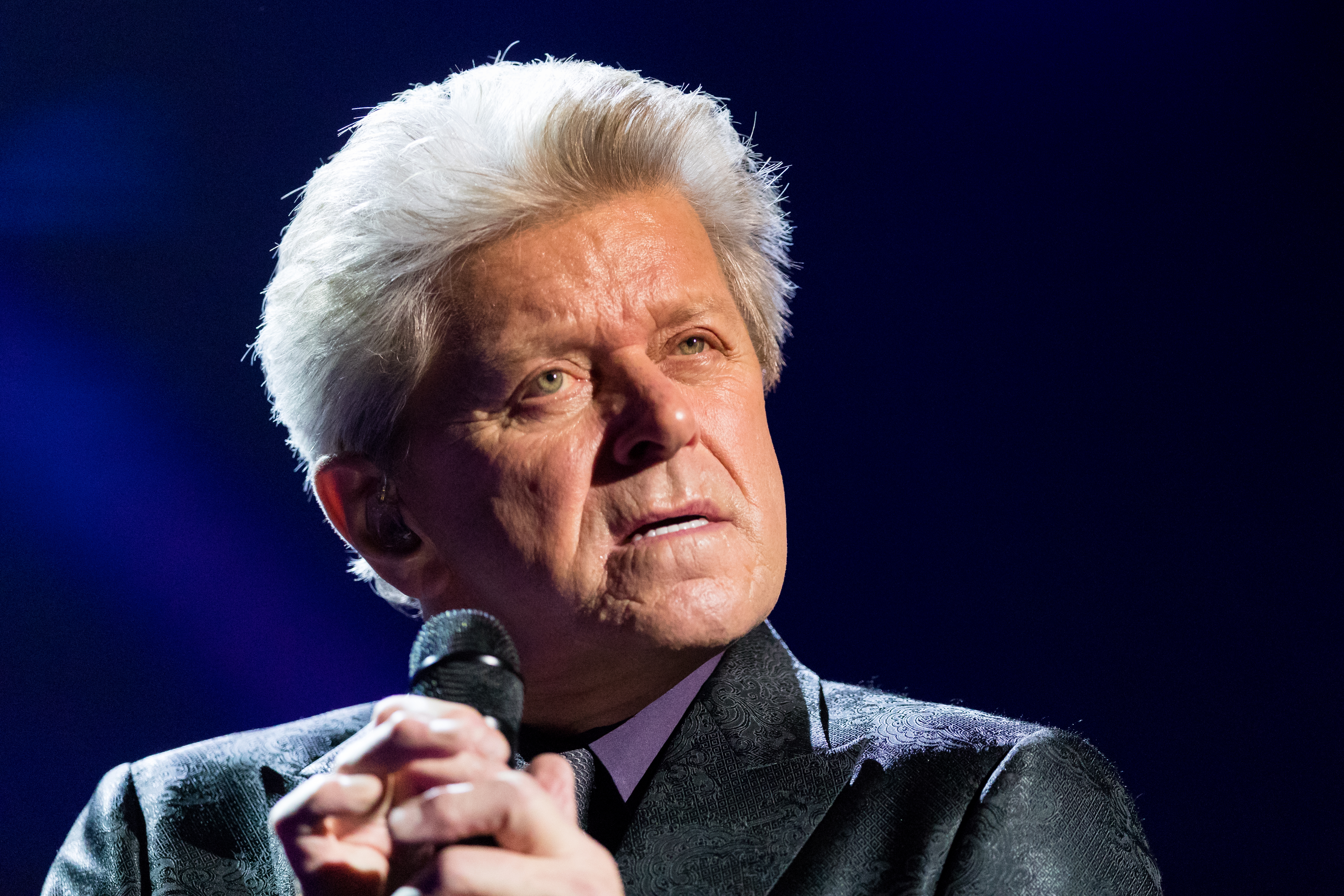
Whitney Houston (left) and Peter Cetera (right, pictured in 2017) held the most weeks at number one on the Canadian adult contemporary charts in 1986, having six weeks each.

RPM was a Canadian music industry magazine that published the best-performing singles charts in Canada from 1964 to 2000. In 1986, RPM published a chart for top-performing singles in the adult contemporary category in Canada. The chart, entitled Adult Contemporary, undergone numerous name changes throughout its existence, becoming Adult Contemporary in August 1984 until the magazine's final publication in November 2000. In 1986, thirty individual songs topped the chart, which contained 30 positions and is based on record sales and adult contemporary radio station playlist submissions.

In the year's first issue of RPM, the first number-one song was "Say You, Say Me" by Lionel Richie, which had reached number one the December of the previous year. A week later, it was replaced by "That's What Friends Are For", a charity single by Dionne & Friends, composed of Dionne Warwick, Gladys Knight, Elton John and Stevie Wonder. Weeks later, it was replaced by James Taylor's cover version of "Everyday" by Buddy Holly and then by "How Will I Know" by Whitney Houston. Four months later, Houston would reach number-one again with her version of George Benson's 1977 single "The Greatest Love of All", topping the chart for five straight weeks between May and June, and by the end of the year, she had a total of six weeks at number one. On August, Peter Cetera, who left the band Chicago in 1985, achieved his first number-one on the Canadian adult contemporary chart with a five-week number-one run throughout August with "Glory of Love", which would then be followed by a week at number one on December with "The Next Time I Fall", a duet with Amy Grant. For a total of six weeks at number one, Cetera would be tied with Houston for the most weeks at number one by the end of the year. Corey Hart was the only Canadian act to reach number one for the year, having a two-week run with "I Am by Your Side" on November. The year's final chart-topper was "Love Is Forever" by Billy Ocean, which held the top position the last week of December. Ocean also had two other number-one singles earlier in 1986, with "When the Going Gets Tough, the Tough Get Going", which held the top spot for the first two weeks of March and "There'll Be Sad Songs (To Make You Cry)", which held the same position for two non-consecutive weeks on July.

== Chart history ==
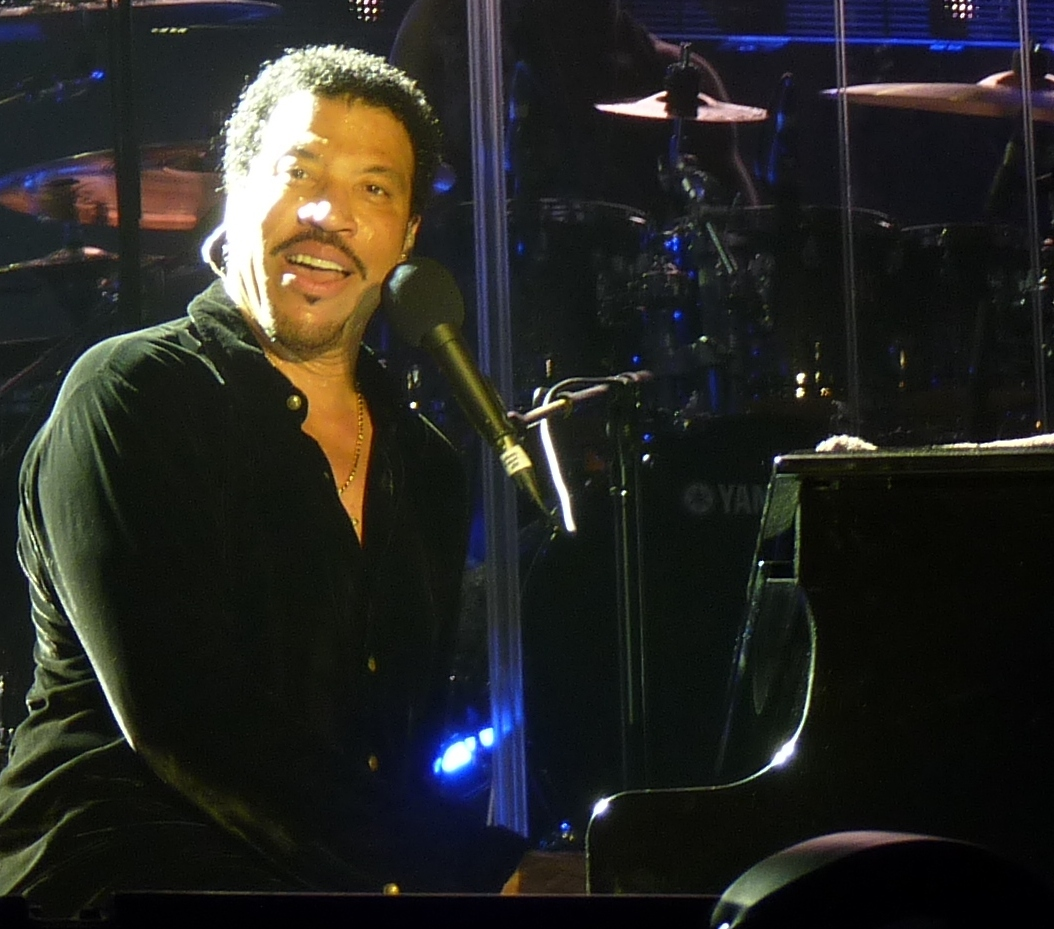
Lionel Richie's began the year with "Say You, Say Me", continuing from December 1985

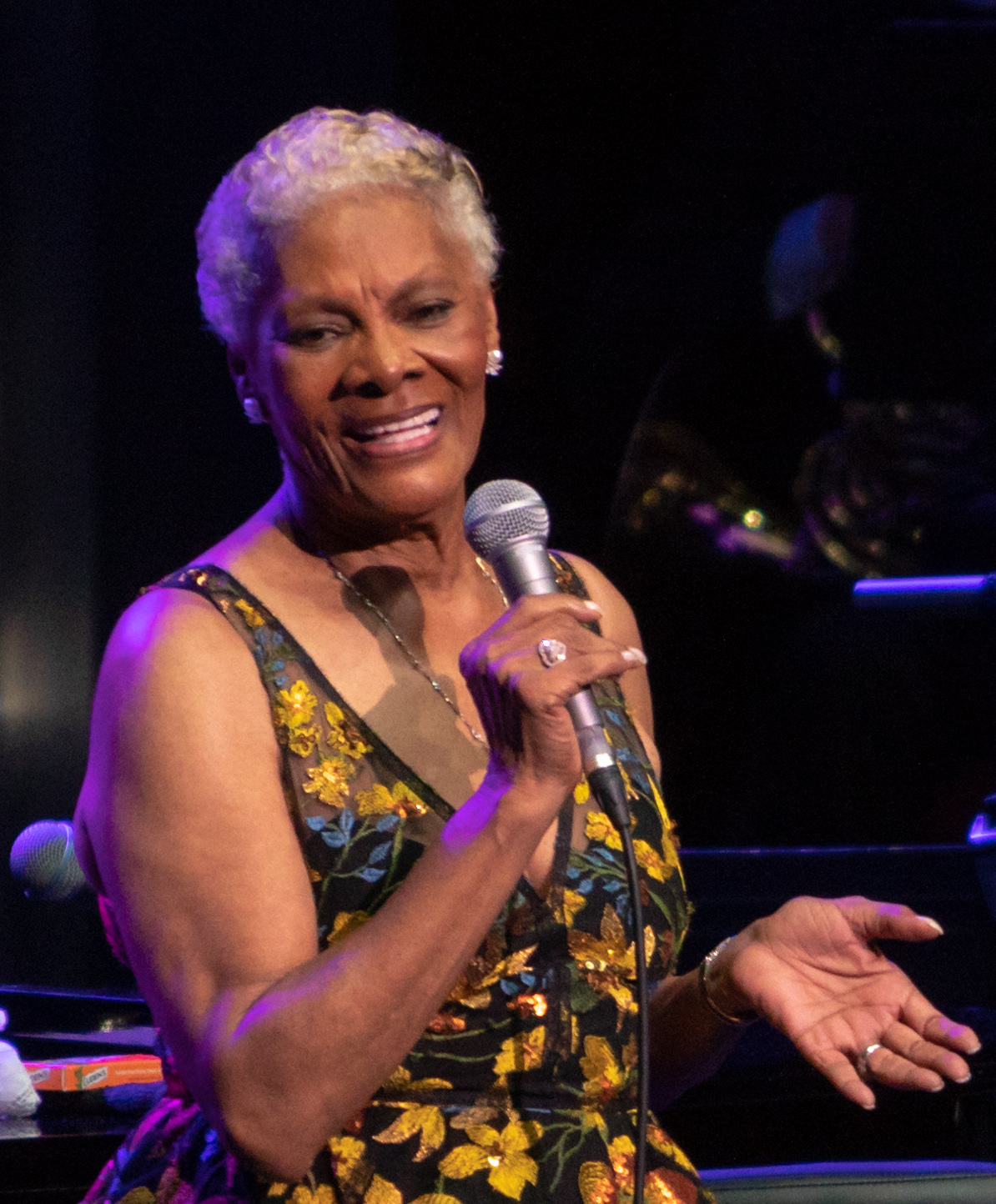
Dionne & Friends, led by Dionne Warwick (pictured), spent two weeks at number one with "That's What Friends Are For"

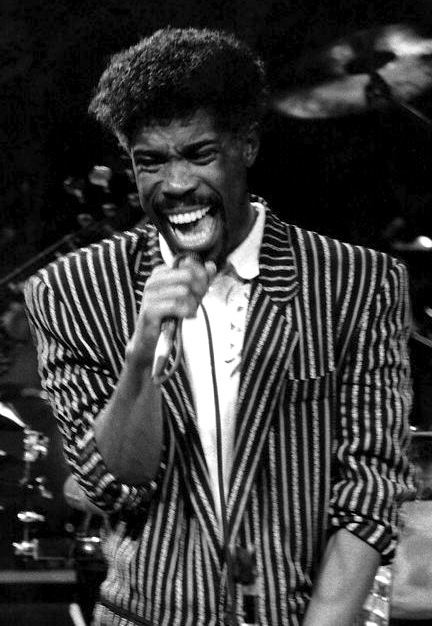
Billy Ocean ended the year at number one with "Love Is Forever"

An asterisk (*) indicates an unpublished weekly chart due to the special double issues RPM publishes for the year-end top singles charts.

Chart history
Issue date	Title	Artist(s)	Ref.
January 4*	"Say You, Say Me"	Lionel Richie	
January 11*	"Say You, Say Me"	Lionel Richie	
January 18	"Say You, Say Me"	Lionel Richie	
January 25	"That's What Friends Are For"	Dionne & Friends	
February 1	"That's What Friends Are For"	Dionne & Friends	
February 8	"Everyday"	James Taylor	
February 15	"How Will I Know"	Whitney Houston	
February 22	"The Sweetest Taboo"	Sade	
March 1	"When the Going Gets Tough, the Tough Get Going"	Billy Ocean	
March 8	"When the Going Gets Tough, the Tough Get Going"	Billy Ocean	
March 15	"The Power of Love"	Jennifer Rush	
March 22	"The Power of Love"	Jennifer Rush	
March 29	"Sara"	Starship	
April 5	"Nikita"	Elton John	
April 12	"These Dreams"	Heart	
April 19	"Overjoyed"	Stevie Wonder	
April 26	"Overjoyed"	Stevie Wonder	
May 3	"Secret Lovers"	Atlantic Starr	
May 10	"Greatest Love of All"	Whitney Houston	
May 17	"Greatest Love of All"	Whitney Houston	
May 24	"Greatest Love of All"	Whitney Houston	
May 31	"Greatest Love of All"	Whitney Houston	
June 7	"Greatest Love of All"	Whitney Houston	
June 14	"Live to Tell"	Madonna	
June 21	"Live to Tell"	Madonna	
June 28	"Live to Tell"	Madonna	
July 5	"There'll Be Sad Songs (To Make You Cry)"	Billy Ocean	
July 12	"No One Is to Blame"	Howard Jones	
July 19	"Holding Back the Years"	Simply Red	
July 26	"There'll Be Sad Songs (To Make You Cry)"	Billy Ocean	
August 2	"Glory of Love"	Peter Cetera	
August 9	"Glory of Love"	Peter Cetera	
August 16	"Glory of Love"	Peter Cetera	
August 23	"Glory of Love"	Peter Cetera	
August 30	"Glory of Love"	Peter Cetera	
September 6	"Invisible Touch"	Genesis	
September 13	"Words Get in the Way"	Miami Sound Machine	
September 20	"Friends and Lovers"	Gloria Loring and Carl Anderson	
September 27	"Friends and Lovers"	Gloria Loring and Carl Anderson	
October 4	"Stuck with You"	Huey Lewis & the News	
October 11	"Stuck with You"	Huey Lewis & the News	
October 18	"Take My Breath Away"	Berlin	
October 25	"Throwing It All Away"	Genesis	
November 1	"True Colors"	Cyndi Lauper	
November 8	"True Colors"	Cyndi Lauper	
November 15	"I Am by Your Side"	Corey Hart	
November 22	"I Am by Your Side"	Corey Hart	
November 29	"Amanda"	Boston	
December 6	"The Next Time I Fall"	Peter Cetera and Amy Grant	
December 13	"Love Will Conquer All"	Lionel Richie	
December 20	"Love Will Conquer All"	Lionel Richie	
December 27	"Love Is Forever"	Billy Ocean	
