= Strictly Come Dancing series 18 =

Established ballroom dancing competition

Strictly Come Dancing
- Series 18
- Presented by: Tess Daly; Claudia Winkleman
- Judges: Shirley Ballas; Motsi Mabuse; Craig Revel Horwood; Anton Du Beke (guest)
- Celebrity winner: Bill Bailey
- Professional winner: Oti Mabuse
- No. of episodes: 17

Release
- Original network: BBC One
- Original release: 17 October – 19 December 2020

Series chronology
- ← Previous; Series 17 Next → Series 19

Strictly Come Dancing returned for its eighteenth series with a launch show on 17 October 2020 on BBC One, and the live shows beginning on 24 October. Due to the COVID-19 pandemic, the series launched a month later than usual and ran for only nine weeks instead of the usual thirteen. Tess Daly and Claudia Winkleman returned as hosts, while Zoe Ball and Rylan Clark-Neal returned to host Strictly Come Dancing: It Takes Two. Clark-Neal was replaced by Gethin Jones for four shows after coming into contact with someone who had tested positive for COVID-19.

On 12 September, it was announced that for the first time since the tenth series, there would be no live show broadcast from the Blackpool Tower Ballroom due to the pandemic. However, it was announced shortly afterwards that there would be four episodes highlighting the best moments from previous series. The final episode featured a tribute to 2014 winner Caroline Flack, who had died on 15 February that year.

Shirley Ballas, Craig Revel Horwood, and Motsi Mabuse returned to the judging panel. On 21 August 2020, it was announced that Bruno Tonioli could not be part of the judging panel for this series due to travel restrictions imposed by the COVID-19 pandemic and his role on Dancing with the Stars. Tonioli instead appeared virtually to give his critiques on the performances during the Sunday night results show. Motsi Mabuse had to miss weeks 4 and 5 in accordance with British government guidelines after travelling to Germany due to a break-in at her dance academy; she was replaced by professional dancer Anton Du Beke, who had previously been eliminated from the competition alongside Jacqui Smith. Du Beke became a permanent judge from the nineteenth series.

Bill Bailey and Oti Mabuse were announced as the winners on 19 December, while HRVY and Janette Manrara, Jamie Laing and Karen Hauer, and Maisie Smith and Gorka Márquez were the runners-up.

== Format ==
Hosts and Judges for Strictly Come Dancing Series 18

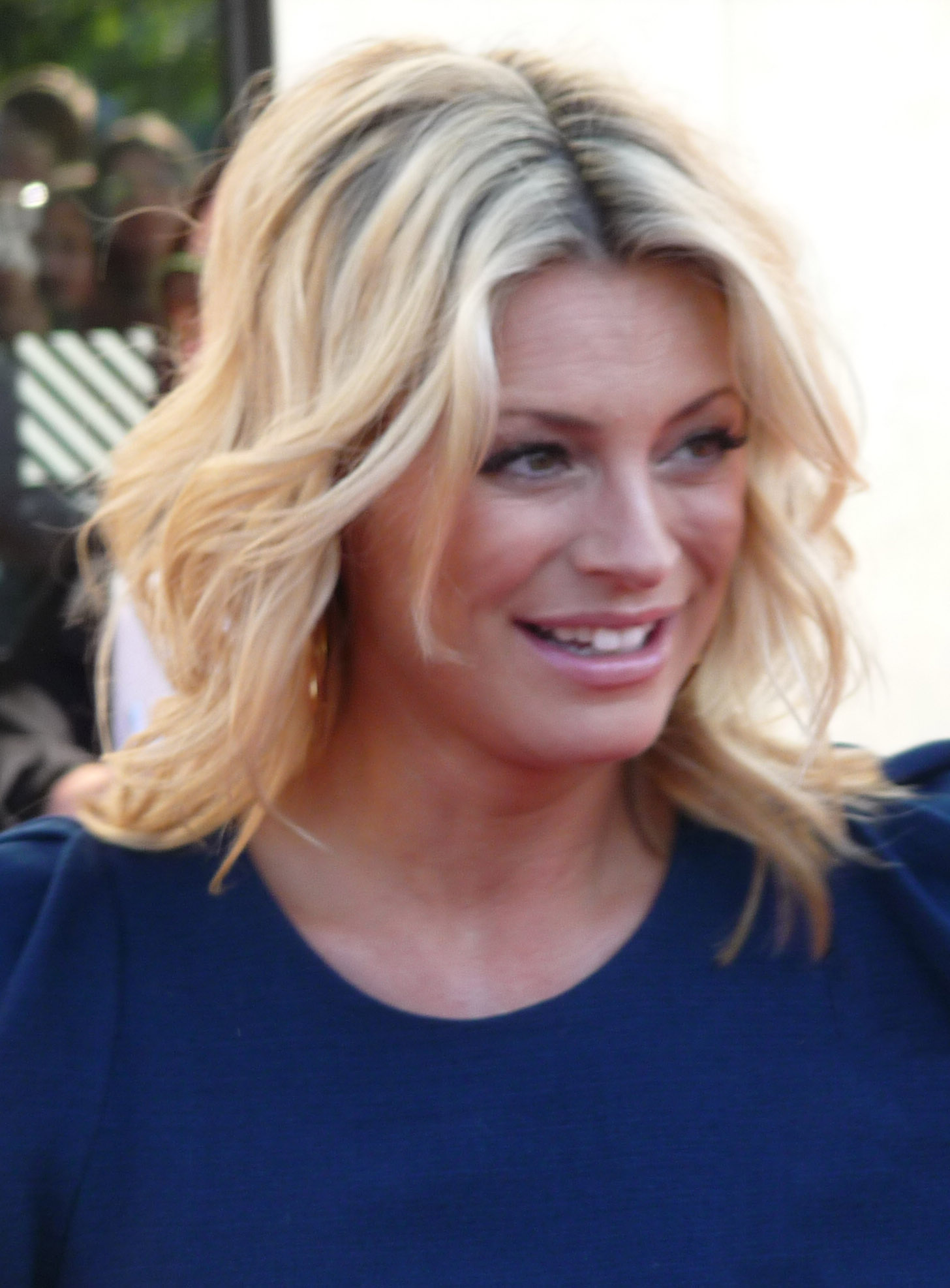
Tess Daly

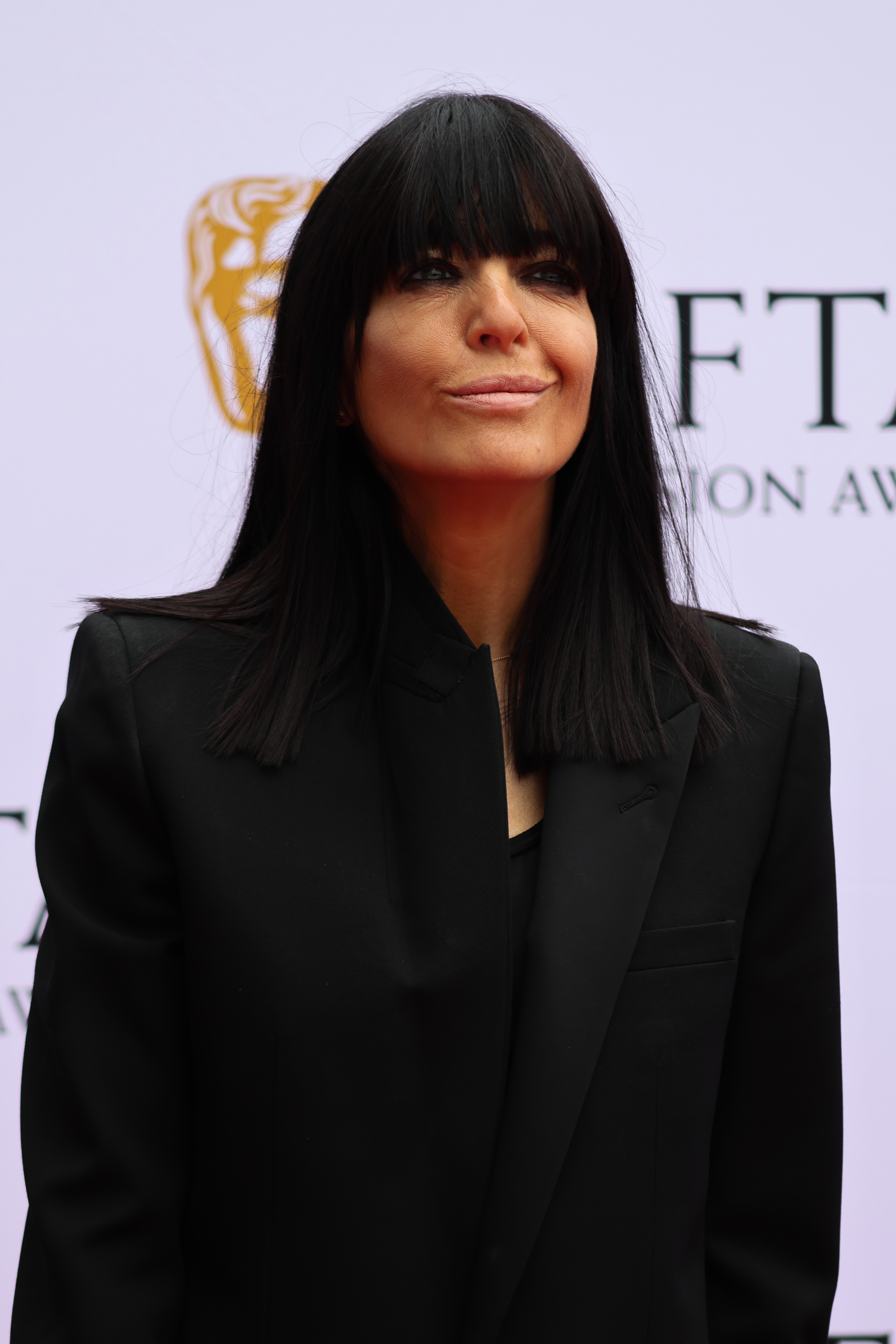
Claudia Winkleman

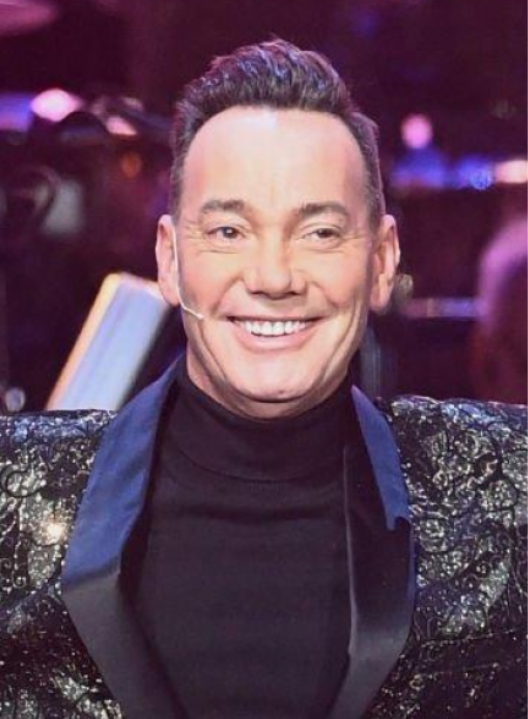
Craig Revel Horwood

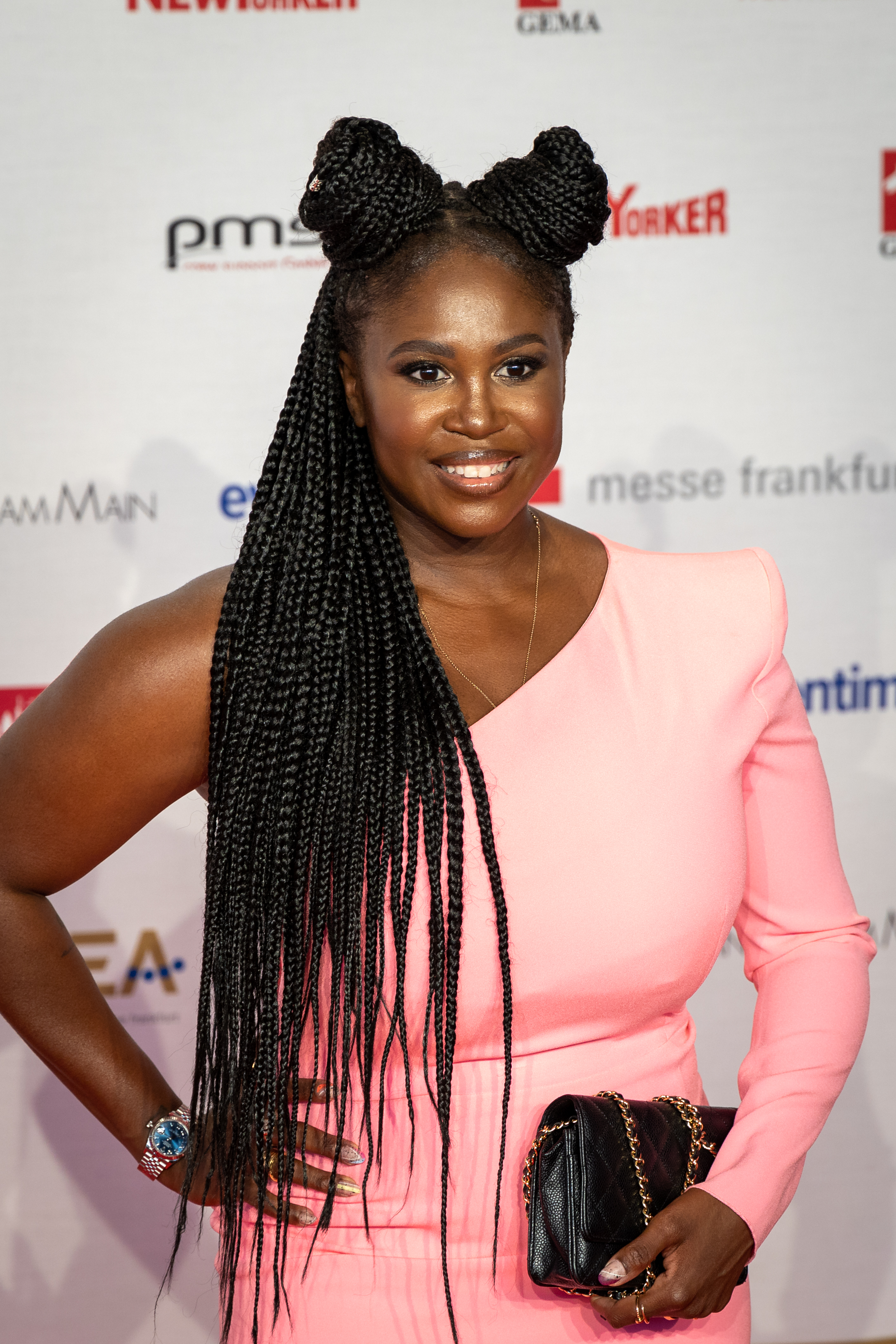
Motsi Mabuse

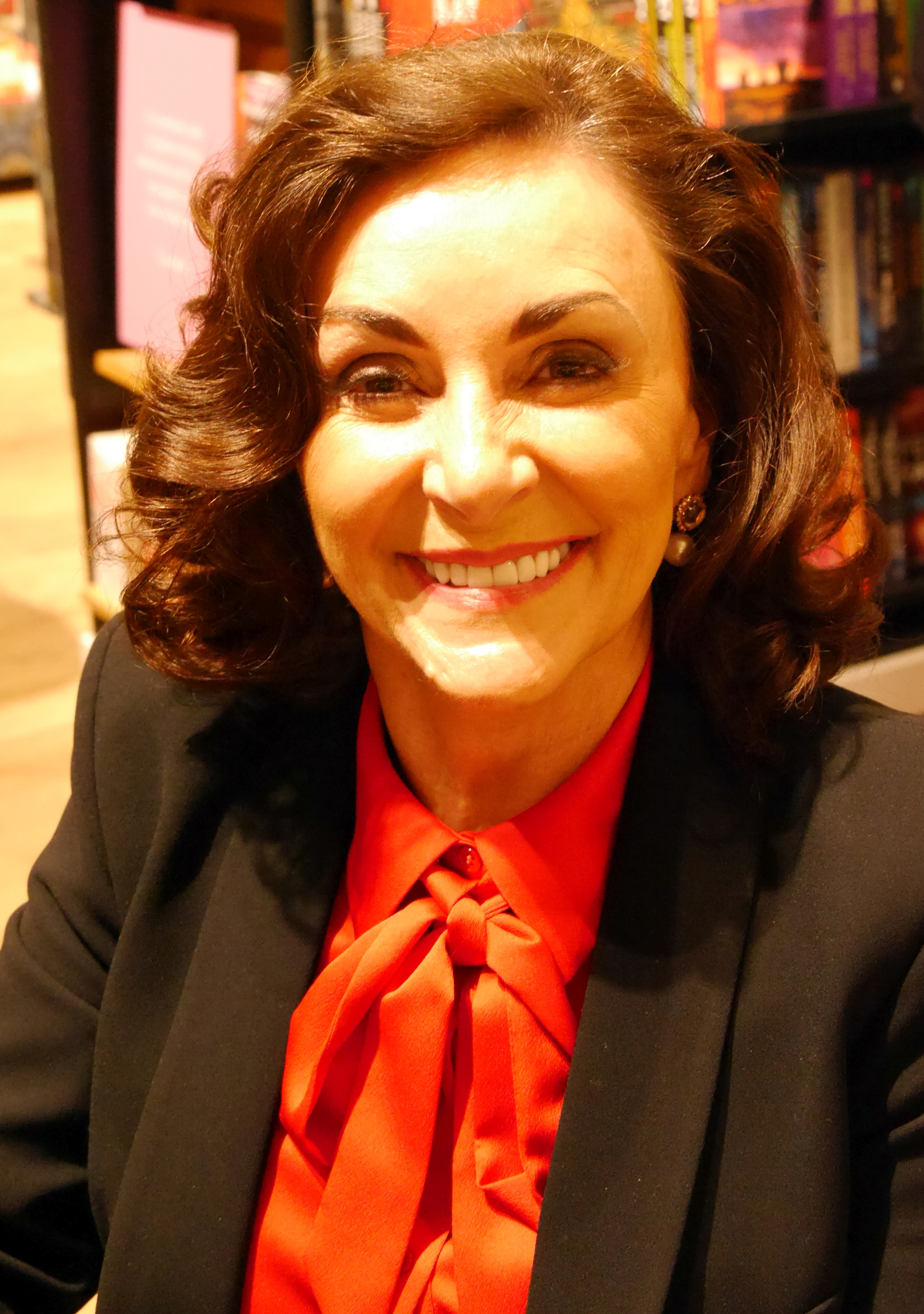
Shirley Ballas

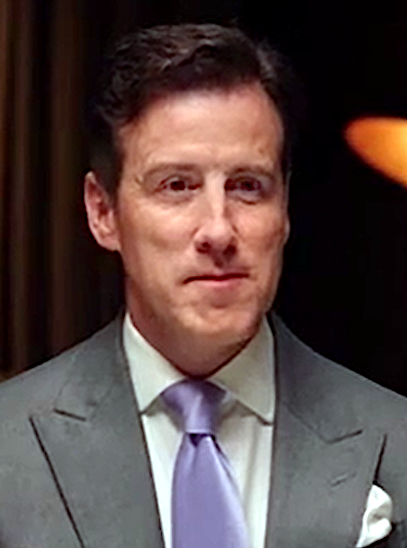
Anton Du Beke (Guest)

The couples dance each week in a live show. The judges score each performance out of ten. The couples are then ranked according to the judges' scores and given points according to their rank, with the lowest scored couple receiving one point, and the highest scored couple receiving the most points (the maximum number of points available depends on the number of couples remaining in the competition). The public are also invited to vote for their favourite couples, and the couples are ranked again according to the number of votes they receive, again receiving points; the couple with the fewest votes receiving one point, and the couple with the most votes receiving the most points.

The points for judges' score and public vote are then added together, and the two couples with the fewest points are placed in the bottom two. If two couples have equal points, the points from the public vote are given precedence. As with the previous series, the bottom two couples have to perform a dance-off on the results show. Based on that performance alone, each judge then votes on which couple should stay and which couple should leave, with Shirley Ballas, as head judge, having the last and deciding vote.

== Professional dancers ==
On 6 March 2020, Kevin Clifton announced he was leaving the show after seven years. Despite being confirmed in the 2020 professional line-up, on 26 March 2020, AJ Pritchard announced he was leaving the show after four years. The other professional dancers from 2019 were all confirmed to be returning for the series. Neil Jones and Nadiya Bychkova only featured in group dances after having partners the previous year, alongside Graziano Di Prima and Nancy Xu.

Due to the pandemic, several changes had to be made in how the professional dancers performed. Firstly, the dancers had to shield at home for two weeks. They then formed a bubble which allowed them to stay in a hotel, where they could practise their routines. All of the group dances were pre-recorded.

== Couples ==
This series featured twelve celebrity contestants. On 1 September 2020, the first three celebrities announced were Caroline Quentin, Jason Bell, and Max George. On 2 September 2020, it was announced that Olympic boxer Nicola Adams would be part of the first same-sex partnership. On 3 September 2020, Made in Chelsea star Jamie Laing was confirmed to be participating in the series after having to withdraw from the seventeenth series due to a foot injury. Celebrity reveals continued throughout the week until the full line-up was revealed on 4 September 2020. On 12 November 2020, it was announced that Katya Jones had tested positive for COVID-19, which meant that she and Nicola Adams had to withdraw from the competition due to the government's guidelines on self-isolation.

Celebrity	Notability	Professional partner	Status
Jacqui Smith	Labour Party politician	Anton Du Beke	Eliminated 1st on 1 November 2020
Jason Bell	NFL player & pundit	Luba Mushtuk	Eliminated 2nd on 8 November 2020
Nicola Adams	Olympic boxer	Katya Jones	Withdrew on 12 November 2020
Max George	The Wanted singer	Dianne Buswell	Eliminated 3rd on 15 November 2020
Caroline Quentin	Actress & television presenter	Johannes Radebe	Eliminated 4th on 22 November 2020
Clara Amfo	BBC Radio 1 presenter	Aljaž Škorjanec	Eliminated 5th on 29 November 2020
JJ Chalmers	Television presenter & Invictus Games medallist	Amy Dowden	Eliminated 6th on 6 December 2020
Ranvir Singh	Good Morning Britain presenter & journalist	Giovanni Pernice	Eliminated 7th on 13 December 2020
HRVY	Singer & television presenter	Janette Manrara	Runners-up on 19 December 2020
Jamie Laing	Made in Chelsea star	Karen Hauer	Runners-up on 19 December 2020
Maisie Smith	EastEnders actress	Gorka Márquez	Runners-up on 19 December 2020
Bill Bailey	Comedian, musician & actor	Oti Mabuse	Winners on 19 December 2020

== Scoring chart ==
The highest score each week is indicated in bold green with a dagger (†), while the lowest score each week is indicated in italicized red with a double-dagger (‡).

Color key:

Winners
Runners-up
Bottom two
Withdrew from competition
Eliminated

Strictly Come Dancing (series 18) - Weekly scores
Couple	Pl.	Week									
Couple	Pl.	1	2	1+2	3	4	5	6	7	8	9
Bill & Oti	1st	15	24	39	26	27	25	24	24	25+23=48	29+30+29=**88**† (Note: This couple finished in first place.)
HRVY & Janette	2nd	**25**†	24	**49**†	21	27	26	**30**†	**29**†	23+30=53	29+29+30=**88**† (Note: This couple finished in second place.)
Jamie & Karen	2nd	14	17	31 (Note: This couple was in the bottom two, but was not eliminated.)	23	25	**29**†	24	24	24+24=48	26+29+29=84‡
Maisie & Gorka	2nd	24	**25**†	**49**†	24	24	27	29	28	30+29=**59**†	29+30+29=**88**†
Ranvir & Giovanni	5th	21	21	42	**27**†	20	27	24	27	26+18=44‡ (Note: This couple was eliminated.)	
JJ & Amy	6th	19	17	36	24	17‡	25	25	20‡		
Clara & Aljaž	7th	18	17	35	20	**29**†	18‡	19‡			
Caroline & Johannes	8th	21	21	42	21	22	24				
Max & Dianne	9th	17	20	37	24	20					
Nicola & Katya	10th	21	24	45	19	(Note: This couple withdrew from the competition.)					
Jason & Luba	11th	16	18	34	12‡						
Jacqui & Anton	12th	13‡	12‡	25‡							

=== Average chart ===
This table only counts for dances scored on a 30-point scale.

Couple	Rank by average	Total points	Number of dances	Total average
Maisie & Gorka	1st	328	12	27.3
HRVY & Janette	2nd	323	12	26.9
Bill & Oti	3rd	301	12	25.1
Jamie & Karen	4th	288	12	24.0
Ranvir & Giovanni	5th	211	9	23.4
Caroline & Johannes	6th	109	5	21.8
Nicola & Katya	7th	64	3	21.3
JJ & Amy	8th	147	7	21.0
Max & Dianne	9th	81	4	20.3
Clara & Aljaž	10th	121	6	20.2
Jason & Luba	11th	46	3	15.3
Jacqui & Anton	12th	25	2	12.5

== Weekly scores ==
Unless indicated otherwise, individual judges' scores in the charts below (given in parentheses) are listed in this order from left to right: Craig Revel Horwood, Shirley Ballas, Motsi Mabuse.

=== Week 1 ===
There was no elimination this week; all scores and votes carried over to the following week. Couples are listed in the order they performed.

Couple	Scores	Dance	Music
Jamie & Karen	14 (4, 5, 5)	Cha-cha-cha	"Think About Things" — Daði og Gagnamagnið
Caroline & Johannes	21 (7, 7, 7)	American Smooth	"Morning Train (9 to 5)" — Sheena Easton
Max & Dianne	17 (6, 5, 6)	Tango	"Best Fake Smile" — James Bay
Clara & Aljaž	18 (5, 6, 7)	Cha-cha-cha	"Don't Start Now" — Dua Lipa
Jacqui & Anton	13 (3, 5, 5)	Foxtrot	"Always Look on the Bright Side of Life" — Monty Python
JJ & Amy	19 (6, 6, 7)	Waltz	"What a Wonderful World" — Louis Armstrong
Maisie & Gorka	24 (8, 8, 8)	Samba	"Samba (Conga)" — Gloria Estefan
Jason & Luba	16 (4, 6, 6)	American Smooth	"My Girl" — The Temptations
Ranvir & Giovanni	21 (7, 7, 7)	Paso doble	"End of Time" — Beyoncé
Nicola & Katya	21 (7, 7, 7)	Quickstep	"Get Happy" — Ella Fitzgerald
Bill & Oti	15 (3, 6, 6)	Cha-cha-cha	"Pata Pata" — Miriam Makeba
HRVY & Janette	25 (8, 8, 9)	Jive	"Faith" — Stevie Wonder, feat. Ariana Grande

=== Week 2 ===
Musical guest: Sam Smith — "Diamonds"

Couples are listed in the order they performed.

Couple	Scores	Dance	Music	Result
Max & Dianne	20 (6, 7, 7)	Jive	"I'm a Believer" — The Monkees	Safe
Clara & Aljaž	17 (5, 6, 6)	Viennese waltz	"You Don't Own Me" — SayGrace	Safe
Bill & Oti	24 (8, 8, 8)	Quickstep	"Talk to the Animals" — Bobby Darin	Safe
JJ & Amy	17 (5, 6, 6)	Paso doble	"Believer" — Imagine Dragons	Safe
Jamie & Karen	17 (5, 6, 6)	American Smooth	"Night and Day" — Frank Sinatra	Bottom two
Maisie & Gorka	25 (8, 9, 8)	Tango	"Midnight Sky" — Miley Cyrus	Safe
Jacqui & Anton	12 (2, 5, 5)	Samba	"Help Yourself" — Tom Jones	Eliminated
HRVY & Janette	24 (7, 8, 9)	Viennese waltz	"Stuck with U" — Ariana Grande & Justin Bieber	Safe
Ranvir & Giovanni	21 (6, 7, 8)	Quickstep	"You Are the Sunshine of My Life" — Stevie Wonder	Safe
Nicola & Katya	24 (8, 8, 8)	Street/Commercial	"Shine" — Years & Years	Safe
Caroline & Johannes	21 (7, 7, 7)	Paso doble	"El gato montés" — Ramon Cortez Pasodoble Orchestra	Safe
Jason & Luba	18 (6, 6, 6)	Salsa	"Get Lucky" — Daft Punk, feat. Pharrell Williams	Safe

Judges' votes to save

- Horwood: Jamie & Karen
- Mabuse: Jamie & Karen
- Ballas: Did not vote, but would have voted to save Jamie & Karen

=== Week 3: Movie Week ===
Musical guests: The Kanneh-Masons — "Ave Maria"

Couples are listed in the order they performed.

Couple	Scores	Dance	Music	Film	Result
Nicola & Katya	19 (6, 7, 6)	Jive	"Greased Lightnin'"	Grease	Bottom two
Maisie & Gorka	24 (8, 7, 9)	American Smooth	"Into the Unknown"	Frozen II	Safe
Caroline & Johannes	21 (6, 7, 8)	Theatre/Jazz	"Everything's Coming Up Roses"	Gypsy	Safe
Jason & Luba	12 (3, 4, 5)	Paso doble	"Star Wars Theme"	Star Wars	Eliminated
JJ & Amy	24 (8, 8, 8)	Foxtrot	"Raindrops Keep Fallin' on My Head"	Butch Cassidy and the Sundance Kid	Safe
HRVY & Janette	21 (6, 7, 8)	Cha-cha-cha	"Don't Go Breaking My Heart"	Gnomeo & Juliet	Safe
Ranvir & Giovanni	27 (9, 9, 9)	Foxtrot	"Love You I Do"	Dreamgirls	Safe
Jamie & Karen	23 (7, 8, 8)	Charleston	"Zero to Hero"	Hercules	Safe
Clara & Aljaž	20 (7, 6, 7)	Tango	"Lady Marmalade"	Moulin Rouge!	Safe
Max & Dianne	24 (8, 8, 8)	Street/Commercial	"The Simpsons Theme"	The Simpsons Movie	Safe
Bill & Oti	26 (8, 9, 9)	Paso doble	"The Good, the Bad and the Ugly"	The Good, the Bad and the Ugly	Safe

Judges' votes to save

- Horwood: Nicola & Katya
- Mabuse: Nicola & Katya
- Ballas: Did not vote, but would have voted to save Nicola & Katya

=== Week 4 ===
Individual judges' scores in the charts below (given in parentheses) are listed in this order from left to right: Craig Revel Horwood, Shirley Ballas, Anton Du Beke.

Musical guest: The Vamps — "Married in Vegas"

Anton Du Beke substituted for Motsi Mabuse, who was forced to miss two weeks due to having travelled outside the United Kingdom.

After Katya Jones tested positive for COVID-19, she and Nicola Adams were forced to withdraw from the competition.

Couples are listed in the order they performed.

Couple	Scores	Dance	Music	Result
HRVY & Janette	27 (8, 10, 9)	Salsa	"Dynamite" — BTS	Safe
Ranvir & Giovanni	20 (5, 7, 8)	Cha-cha-cha	"Oye Como Va" — Santana & "I Like It Like That" — Pete Rodriguez	Safe
Max & Dianne	20 (5, 7, 8)	American Smooth	"It Had to Be You" — Harry Connick Jr.	Eliminated
JJ & Amy	17 (4, 6, 7)	Jive	"Boogie Woogie Bugle Boy" — Bette Midler	Safe
Maisie & Gorka	24 (7, 8, 9)	Cha-cha-cha	"Girls Just Want to Have Fun" — Cyndi Lauper	Bottom two
Bill & Oti	27 (8, 10, 9)	Street/Commercial	"Rapper's Delight" — The Sugarhill Gang	Safe
Caroline & Johannes	22 (7, 7, 8)	Waltz	"With You I'm Born Again" — Billy Preston & Syreeta Wright	Safe
Jamie & Karen	25 (8, 8, 9)	Samba	"Bamboléo" — Gipsy Kings	Safe
Clara & Aljaž	29 (9, 10, 10)	Charleston	"Baby Face" — Julie Andrews	Safe

Judges' votes to save

- Horwood: Maisie & Gorka
- Du Beke: Maisie & Gorka
- Ballas: Did not vote, but would have voted to save Max & Dianne

=== Week 5 ===
Individual judges' scores in the charts below (given in parentheses) are listed in this order from left to right: Craig Revel Horwood, Shirley Ballas, Anton Du Beke.

Musical guest: Billy Ocean — "Love Really Hurts Without You", "Red Light Spells Danger" & "When the Going Gets Tough, the Tough Get Going"

Anton Du Beke again substituted for Motsi Mabuse.

Couples are listed in the order they performed.

Couple	Scores	Dance	Music	Result
Bill & Oti	25 (8, 9, 8)	American Smooth	"I've Got You Under My Skin" — Frank Sinatra	Safe
Maisie & Gorka	27 (9, 9, 9)	Salsa	"Better When I'm Dancin'" — Meghan Trainor	Bottom two
JJ & Amy	25 (7, 9, 9)	Quickstep	"For Once in My Life" — Stevie Wonder	Safe
Clara & Aljaž	18 (5, 6, 7)	Samba	"That's the Way (I Like It)" — KC and the Sunshine Band	Safe
Jamie & Karen	29 (9, 10, 10)	Street/Commercial	"Gonna Make You Sweat (Everybody Dance Now)" — C+C Music Factory	Safe
HRVY & Janette	26 (8, 9, 9)	Tango	"Golden" — Harry Styles	Safe
Caroline & Johannes	24 (8, 8, 8)	Cha-cha-cha	"Rescue Me" — Fontella Bass	Eliminated
Ranvir & Giovanni	27 (8, 9, 10)	Argentine tango	"When Doves Cry" — Prince	Safe

Judges' votes to save

- Horwood: Maisie & Gorka
- Du Beke: Maisie & Gorka
- Ballas: Did not vote, but would have voted to save Maisie & Gorka

=== Week 6 ===
Musical guest: Gary Barlow — "Elita"
Dance guests: Michael & Jowita — "Spectrum (Say My Name)"

Couples are listed in the order they performed.

Couple	Scores	Dance	Music	Result
Clara & Aljaž	19 (6, 6, 7)	Jive	"River Deep, Mountain High" — Ike & Tina Turner	Eliminated
Jamie & Karen	24 (8, 8, 8)	Tango	"Tanguera" — Sexteto Mayor	Bottom two
HRVY & Janette	30 (10, 10, 10)	Street/Commercial	"A Sky Full of Stars" — Coldplay	Safe
Ranvir & Giovanni	24 (8, 8, 8)	American Smooth	"I Say a Little Prayer" — Aretha Franklin	Safe
Bill & Oti	24 (8, 8, 8)	Jive	"One Way or Another" — Blondie	Safe
JJ & Amy	25 (8, 9, 8)	Viennese waltz	"Rescue" — Lauren Daigle	Safe
Maisie & Gorka	29 (9, 10, 10)	Quickstep	"When You're Smiling" — Andy Williams	Safe

Judges' votes to save

- Horwood: Clara & Aljaž
- Mabuse: Jamie & Karen
- Ballas: Jamie & Karen

=== Week 7: Musicals Week (Quarter-final) ===
Musical guest: Marisha Wallace — "Climb Ev'ry Mountain" (from The Sound of Music)

Couples are listed in the order they performed.

Couple	Scores	Dance	Music	Musical	Result
JJ & Amy	20 (6, 7, 7)	Charleston	"Chitty Chitty Bang Bang"	Chitty Chitty Bang Bang	Eliminated
Ranvir & Giovanni	27 (9, 9, 9)	Viennese waltz	"She Used to Be Mine"	Waitress	Safe
Maisie & Gorka	28 (9, 10, 9)	Jive	"Little Shop of Horrors"	Little Shop of Horrors	Safe
Bill & Oti	24 (8, 8, 8)	Argentine tango	"The Phantom of the Opera"	The Phantom of the Opera	Safe
HRVY & Janette	29 (9, 10, 10)	American Smooth	"One (Singular Sensation)"	A Chorus Line	Safe
Jamie & Karen	24 (8, 8, 8)	Jive	"Everybody's Talking About Jamie"	Everybody's Talking About Jamie	Bottom two

Judges' votes to save

- Horwood: Jamie & Karen
- Mabuse: JJ & Amy
- Ballas: Jamie & Karen

=== Week 8: Semi-final ===
Musical guest: Little Mix — "Break Up Song"

Each couple performed two routines, and are listed in the order they performed.

Couple	Scores	Dance	Music	Result
Jamie & Karen	24 (8, 8, 8)	Salsa	"Last Dance" — Donna Summer	Bottom two
Jamie & Karen	24 (8, 8, 8)	Quickstep	"Thank God I'm a Country Boy" — John Denver	Bottom two
Ranvir & Giovanni	26 (8, 9, 9)	Waltz	"Un Giorno Per Noi (A Time for Us)" — Josh Groban	Eliminated
Ranvir & Giovanni	18 (5, 6, 7)	Jive	"Candyman" — Christina Aguilera	Eliminated
Bill & Oti	25 (8, 8, 9)	Charleston	"(Won't You Come Home) Bill Bailey" — Ottilie Patterson & Chris Barber	Safe
Bill & Oti	23 (8, 7, 8)	Tango	"Enter Sandman" — Metallica	Safe
Maisie & Gorka	30 (10, 10, 10)	Street/Commercial	"Gettin' Jiggy wit It" — Will Smith	Safe
Maisie & Gorka	29 (9, 10, 10)	Viennese waltz	"A Thousand Years" — Christina Perri	Safe
HRVY & Janette	23 (7, 8, 8)	Rumba	"Only You" — Kylie Minogue & James Corden	Safe
HRVY & Janette	30 (10, 10, 10)	Charleston	"Another Day of Sun" — from La La Land	Safe

Judges' votes to save

- Horwood: Jamie & Karen
- Mabuse: Ranvir & Giovanni
- Ballas: Jamie & Karen

=== Week 9: Final ===
Musical guest: Robbie Williams — "Time for Change"

Each couple performed three routines: one chosen by the judges, their favourite dance of the season, and their showdance routine. Couples are listed in the order they performed.

Couple	Scores	Dance	Music	Result
HRVY & Janette	29 (9, 10, 10)	Jive	"Faith" — Stevie Wonder, feat. Ariana Grande	Runners-up
HRVY & Janette	29 (9, 10, 10)	Showdance	"Boogie Wonderland" — Brittany Murphy	Runners-up
HRVY & Janette	30 (10, 10, 10)	American Smooth	"One (Singular Sensation)" — from A Chorus Line	Runners-up
Jamie & Karen	26 (8, 9, 9)	Charleston	"Zero to Hero" — from Hercules	Runners-up
Jamie & Karen	29 (9, 10, 10)	Showdance	"I'm Still Standing" — Elton John	Runners-up
Jamie & Karen	29 (9, 10, 10)	Street/Commercial	"Gonna Make You Sweat (Everybody Dance Now)" — C+C Music Factory	Runners-up
Bill & Oti	29 (9, 10, 10)	Quickstep	"Talk to the Animals" — Bobby Darin	Winners
Bill & Oti	30 (10, 10, 10)	Showdance	"The Show Must Go On" — Queen	Winners
Bill & Oti	29 (9, 10, 10)	Street/Commercial	"Rapper's Delight" — The Sugarhill Gang	Winners
Maisie & Gorka	29 (9, 10, 10)	Samba	"Samba (Conga)" — Gloria Estefan	Runners-up
Maisie & Gorka	30 (10, 10, 10)	Showdance	"We Need a Little Christmas" — Idina Menzel	Runners-up
Maisie & Gorka	29 (9, 10, 10)	Quickstep	"When You're Smiling" — Andy Williams	Runners-up

== Dance chart ==
The couples performed the following each week:

- Weeks 1–7: One unlearned dance
- Week 8 (Semifinal): Two unlearned dances
- Week 9 (Final): Judges' choice, showdance & favourite dance of the series

Strictly Come Dancing (series 18) - Dance chart
Couple	Week											
Couple	1	2	3	4	5	6	7	8		9		
Bill & Oti	Cha-cha-cha	Quickstep	Paso doble	Street/Commercial	American Smooth	Jive	Argentine tango	Charleston	Tango	Quickstep	Showdance	Street/Commercial
HRVY & Janette	Jive	Viennese waltz	Cha-cha-cha	Salsa	Tango	Street/Commercial	American Smooth	Rumba	Charleston	Jive	Showdance	American Smooth
Jamie & Karen	Cha-cha-cha	American Smooth	Charleston	Samba	Street/Commercial	Tango	Jive	Salsa	Quickstep	Charleston	Showdance	Street/Commercial
Maisie & Gorka	Samba	Tango	American Smooth	Cha-cha-cha	Salsa	Quickstep	Jive	Street/Commercial	Viennese waltz	Samba	Showdance	Quickstep
Ranvir & Giovanni	Paso doble	Quickstep	Foxtrot	Cha-cha-cha	Argentine tango	American Smooth	Viennese waltz	Waltz	Jive			
JJ & Amy	Waltz	Paso doble	Foxtrot	Jive	Quickstep	Viennese waltz	Charleston					
Clara & Aljaž	Cha-cha-cha	Viennese waltz	Tango	Charleston	Samba	Jive						
Caroline & Johannes	American Smooth	Paso doble	Theatre/Jazz	Waltz	Cha-cha-cha							
Max & Dianne	Tango	Jive	Street/Commercial	American Smooth								
Nicola & Katya	Quickstep	Street/Commercial	Jive									
Jason & Luba	American Smooth	Salsa	Paso doble									
Jacqui & Anton	Foxtrot	Samba										

== Ratings ==
Weekly ratings for each show on BBC One. All ratings are provided by BARB.

Episode	Date	Official rating (millions)	Weekly rank for BBC One	Weekly rank for all UK TV	Share
Launch show	17 October	10.09	1	2	42.2%
Week 1	24 October	11.23	1	1	44.6%
Week 2	31 October	11.84	2	2	47.3%
Week 2 results	1 November	8.92	4	5	39.3%
Week 3	7 November	10.93	1	1	43.8%
Week 3 results	8 November	9.44	2	3	39.3%
Week 4	14 November	11.89	1	2	49.3%
Week 4 results	15 November	9.62	2	4	39.5%
Week 5	21 November	11.60	1	6	48.5%
Week 5 results	22 November	9.62	2	9	40.9%
Week 6	28 November	11.45	1	2	50.1%
Week 6 results	29 November	10.21	2	9	39.5%
Week 7	5 December	11.38	1	2	49.3%
Week 7 results	6 December	9.69	2	7	42.2%
Week 8	12 December	11.45	1	1	48.9%
Week 8 results	13 December	10.58	2	2	44.1%
Week 9	19 December	12.51	1	1	53.3%
Series average (excl. launch show)	2020	10.77	—N/a	—N/a	45.0%
