= Greatest Hits (Billy Ocean album) =

Greatest hits album by Billy Ocean
- Released: 16 October 1989
- Genres: R&B; pop; rock
- Length: 56:15
- Labels: Jive; RCA
- Producers: Barry J. Eastmond; Wayne Brathwaite; Keith Diamond; Robert John "Mutt" Lange

Billy Ocean chronology
Tear Down These Walls (1988)	Greatest Hits (1989)	The Collection — 1976-1991: 15 Years...The Story Continues (1991)

Singles from Greatest Hits
- 1. "Licence to Chill" Released: September 1989

Professional ratings
Review scores
Source	Rating
AllMusic	4.5/5 stars

Greatest Hits is a greatest hits album by British R&B singer and songwriter Billy Ocean, released in 1989. The album features Ocean's biggest hit singles of the 1980s, along with two new singles, "I Sleep Much Better (In Someone Else's Bed)" and "Licence to Chill", the latter of which became Ocean's twelfth and final US top 40 hit to date, reaching No. 32. Greatest Hits became Ocean's best-selling release in the UK, becoming his only album to reach Platinum status there. It has also been certified Platinum in the US.

== Track listing ==
No.	Title	Writer(s)	Length
1.	"When the Going Gets Tough, the Tough Get Going"	Billy Ocean, Robert John "Mutt" Lange, Wayne Brathwaite, Barry Eastmond	4:08
2.	"License to Chill"	Ocean, Lange	4:52
3.	"Caribbean Queen (No More Love on the Run)"	Ocean, Keith Diamond	4:06
4.	"There'll Be Sad Songs (To Make You Cry)"	Ocean, Brathwaite, Eastmond	4:50
5.	"Loverboy"	Ocean, Diamond, Lange	4:09
6.	"Suddenly"	Ocean, Diamond	3:51
7.	"Get Outta My Dreams, Get into My Car"	Ocean, Lange	4:43
8.	"Love Zone"	Ocean, Brathwaite, Eastmond	4:13
9.	"Here's to You"	Ocean, Brathwaite, Eastmond, Jolyon Skinner	4:11
10.	"I Sleep Much Better (In Someone Else's Bed)"	Ocean, Lange	5:15
11.	"The Colour of Love"	Ocean, Brathwaite, Eastmond, Skinner	4:22
12.	"Calypso Crazy"	Ocean, Lange	4:28
13.	"Mystery Lady"	Ocean, Diamond, James Woodley	3:55
Total length:			56:15

On the US issue, "Tear Down These Walls" (Ocean, Lange, Teddy Riley) replaces "Calypso Crazy".

== Charts ==
=== Weekly charts ===
Chart (1989–90)	Peak position
Australian Albums (ARIA)	14
Canada Top Albums/CDs (RPM)	59
Dutch Albums (Album Top 100)	60
New Zealand Albums (RMNZ)	7
UK Albums (Official Charts)	4
US Billboard 200	77

=== Year-end charts ===
Chart (1989)	Position
UK Albums (Official Charts)	61

Chart (1993)	Position
New Zealand Albums (RMNZ)	39

== Certifications ==
Region	Certification	Certified units/sales
Canada (Music Canada)	Platinum	100,000^{^}
United Kingdom (BPI)	Platinum	300,000^{^}
United States (RIAA)	Platinum	1,000,000^{^}
^{^} Shipments figures based on certification alone.
