= Stop Me (disambiguation) =

Stop Me is a 1988 compilation album by the Smiths.

Stop Me may also refer to:

- "Stop Me If You Think You've Heard This One Before", a song by the Smiths, 1987; covered by Mark Ronson as "Stop Me", 2007
- "Stop Me" (Christon Gray song), 2016
- "Stop Me", a song by Chris Cornell from Scream, 2009
- "Stop Me", a song by Donna Summer from The Wanderer, 1980
- "Stop Me", a song by Natalia Kills from Trouble, 2013
- "Stop Me", a song by Patricia Paay, 1987
- "Stop Me", a song by Shelby Lynne from Soft Talk, 1991
- "Stop Me", a song by the Shirelles, 1958
- "Stop Me (If You've Heard it All Before)", a song by Billy Ocean from Billy Ocean, 1976
- "Stop Me (Stop You)", a song by Nick Murphy, 2016
- "Stop Me", season 1 finale of horror-comedy television The Horror of Dolores Roach

== See also ==
- Stop Me If You've Heard This (disambiguation)
