= Red Light Spells Danger =

Single by Billy Ocean
- A-side: "Red Light Spells Danger"
- B-side: "Sweet Memories"
- Released: 11 March 1977
- Genre: Pop
- Length: 3:33
- Label: GTO
- Songwriters: Leslie Charles, Ben Findon
- Producer: Ben Findon

Billy Ocean singles chronology
"Stop Me (If You've Heard It All Before)" (1976)	"Red Light Spells Danger" (1977)	"Let's Put Our Emotions in Motion" (1979)

"Red Light Spells Danger" is a single recorded by Billy Ocean in 1977. It was written by Ocean (credited under his real name, Leslie Charles), and producer Ben Findon. The song became his second UK top 10, peaking at number two.

It was first released by GTO Records on 11 March 1977. The songs b-side, "Sweet Memories", was written by Ocean (again credited under his real name) and Geoff Downes, later of The Buggles. The song is sung in the key of E.

== Reception ==
The song charted in the United Kingdom, Germany, Netherlands, and New Zealand. In the UK, it peaked at number two (his second single to peak at number two after "Love Really Hurts Without You"), with "Knowing Me, Knowing You" by ABBA preventing the song from reaching the top of the charts for two weeks. It went to number ten in New Zealand, number eleven in the Netherlands, and number fifteen in Germany.

"Red Light Spells Danger" ranked 47 in the 1977 Year-end charts. The song was certified gold in 2020, forty-three years after its release, and by 2025, was double platinum.

== Charts ==
Weekly charts

Chart (1978)	Peak position
Germany (GfK Entertainment charts)	15
Netherlands (Dutch Charts)	11
New Zealand (Official Aotearoa Music Charts)	10
UK Singles (OCC)	2

Year-end charts

Chart (1978)	Peak position
UK Singles (OCC)	47

== In media and popular culture ==
It is the 'walk on' music of British professional darts player Ross Smith.
