= Stop Me If You've Heard This =

Stop Me If You've Heard This (and variations) may refer to:

- Stop Me If You've Heard This: A History and Philosophy of Jokes, 2008 non-fiction book by Jim Holt
- Stop Me If You've Heard This One, 1940s radio comedy series
- Stop Me If You've Heard This One Before, 2008 novel by David Yoo
- "Stop Me (If You've Heard it All Before)", 1976 song by Billy Ocean
- "Stop Me If You Think You've Heard This One Before", 1987 song by the Smiths
- Stop Me If You Think You've Heard This One Before..., 2003 compilation covers album

== See also ==
- Stop Us If You've Heard This One Before, 2012 compilation album by Barenaked Ladies
- Stop Us If You've Heard This One Before, Vol 1., 2008 covers album by The Wildhearts
