= Stop Me (If You've Heard It All Before) =

Song by Billy Ocean

from the album Billy Ocean
- A-side: "Stop Me (If You've Heard It All Before)"
- B-side: "Let's Put Our Emotions in Motion"
- Released: November 1976
- Composer: Findon-Charles- Myers
- Producer: Ben Findon

UK chronology
"L.O.D. (Love on Delivery)" (1976)	"Stop Me (If You've Heard It All Before)" (1976)	"Red Light Spells Danger" (1976)

"Stop Me (If You've Heard It All Before)" is a 1976 record single for Billy Ocean. It was a hit for him that year and made the UK Top 20.

== Background ==
"Stop Me (If You've Heard It All Before)" was composed by Ben Findon, Leslie Charles, and Michael Myers. It was recorded by Billy Ocean with Ben Findon handling the production duties. Backed with "Let's Put Our Emotions in Motion", it was released on GTO GT 72 in November 1976. "Stop Me (If You've Heard It All Before)" was one of three songs from Billy Ocean's self-titled debut album that made the Top 20. He also performed the song on Top of the Pops.

The song was also recorded by Karel Gott and appeared as the B side of his single, "Do Re Mi La" that was released in 1977.

== Charts ==
=== UK ===
"Stop Me (If You've Heard It All Before)" made its debut at No. 15 on the UK Disco Top 20 chart for the week of 20 November 1976. It peaked at No. 9 for the week of 8 January 1977.

The song also made the Record Mirror DJ Top Ten.

"Stop Me (If You've Heard It All Before)" would eventually peak at No. 9 on the New Musical Express chart.

Nationally it peaked at No. 12 during its eleven-week run.

=== Other countries ===
The single peaked at No. 32 in Belgium during its four-week run. It also spent fourteen weeks in the New Zealand charts, peaking at No. 12.
