= David Yoo =

American fiction writer (born 1974)

David Yoo (born 1974) is an American fiction writer.

== Overview ==
David Yoo is the author of two young adult novels. He has also contributed to several anthologies. He has published fiction and nonfiction in Massachusetts Review, Rush Hour, Maryland Review, and the anthology Guys Write for Guys Read (Viking). He is also a columnist for KoreAm Journal.

David Yoo is a graduate from Skidmore College with an MA in creative writing from the University of Colorado-Boulder. Reading Rants Top Ten Books for Teens choice.

He lives in Massachusetts, where he teaches fiction at the Gotham Writers' Workshop, and is a mentor for the Solstice MFA program at Pine Manor College in Chestnut Hill, MA.

== Books ==
- Girls For Breakfast (2004)
- Stop Me If You've Heard This One Before (2008)
- The Detention Club (2011)
- The Choke Artist (2012)
- "Heartbeat" (essay)
