= The Choke Artist =

2012 autobiography by David Yoo

- First edition
- Author: David Yoo
- Language: English
- Genre: Autobiography
- Publisher: Grand Central Publishing
- Publication date: June 2012
- Publication place: United States
- Media type: Print (paperback)
- Pages: 258
- ISBN: 978-0-446-57345-0 (paperback)

The Choke Artist is the 2012 autobiography of David Yoo. His fourth book, it was published eight years after his first effort Girls For Breakfast. The book was a selection for the Massachusetts “Must Read” list and a 2013 Finalist for the Massachusetts Book Award.

== Synopsis ==
=== High school ===
David attended high school in the affluent, lily-white suburb of Avon, Connecticut. Being a Korean American, he was a minority and therefore identified with the only black student in his grade and became obsessed with rap music. The infatuation with rap ended abruptly when David and his “crew”, including friends Jay and Chris, attended a rap concert at the Springfield Civic Center. Dave’s crew were exposed as pretenders when the headliner shouted, “Let me get a shout-out for the three white boys in the audience!”

Meanwhile, Dave’s sister, Liz, who, by his admission, looked “way more Asian than me,” studied and practiced the violin for six hours a day. Without friends, she channeled her energy into excelling at everything, turning achievement into a form of revenge against those who had rejected her. Dave, by contrast, responded to his sister’s existence by becoming hyperaggressive, obnoxious, and deliberately self-destructive. He took a strange pride in making himself an anomaly: an underachieving Asian American teenager. As his report cards deteriorated, his anguished parents pleaded with him in Korean, “Aigu jugeta,” meaning, “Oh God, you’re killing me.”

Dave came to realize that his two biggest problems (his glaring ethnicity and his inability to attract girls) were intrinsically linked. He abandoned his studies and decided to focus exclusively on his social life, in particular, dating a Popular White Girl (PWG). Dating a Nice Korean Girl (NKG), as his parents wanted, was revolting to Dave. The thought of dating an NKG felt like waving the white flag socially. Moreover, he found them heinous because they reminded him of his mother and sister. His difficulty attracting the opposite sex, in both high school and college, stemmed, in part from his skinny, effeminate physique. In fact, in gym class, without his shirt, from the waist up, Dave looked remarkably like the nude little girl, running away from a napalm attack, in the famous, Pulitzer Prize winning, photo from the Vietnam War.

=== College ===
Dave’s insecurities were not ameliorated in college when he found his roommate, Jake to be the most popular and charismatic guy in school. Not only were instructors and staff enamored with ‘Happy Jake’, but Jake built up a cult of adoring freshman girls within weeks of arriving at Skidmore College. Dave was consumed with jealousy and suspicion, convinced that anybody who smiled all the time was evil and that his roommate must be a fraud. During his sophomore year Dave roomed with Paul, who was inconsiderate to Dave sensibilities, by acquiring a steady girlfriend, who slept over virtually every night. Dave was infuriated to learn that the two lovebirds had been having sex after Dave had fallen asleep.

Finally, Dave found a girlfriend, Angie, who was extremely cute, but had relatively huge arms. Despite Dave’s fixation with the gym, his arms were relatively puny. Dave became jealous, then came to resent, then hate, Angie for her massive arms and the couple broke up.

Despite Dave’s obsession with PWG’s, shortly after the Angie period ended, he developed a relationship with an Oriental girl from the Asian Cultural Association. When the relationship turned sexual, his phobia about the size of his Asian penis and his contempt for Asian females inhibited Dave from getting an erection. He pretended to be drunk and dizzy and when she left disappointed, he hated himself and Asian girls more than ever. Dave’s overriding concern in his Junior and Senior year at college was simply getting an erection. Even an oblique reference to his Asian origins, by his love interest, such as “You have sad eyes.”, was sufficient to render his member flaccid.

=== Graduate school ===
Dave enrolled in a graduate creative writing program located far from New England to distance himself from his home region. Upon arrival, he observed that he remained one of the few Asian students in the program and expressed frustration with the lifestyle and consumer choices of his classmates.

In Boulder, Dave decided not to cut his hair until he had finished the program. Out drinking one night and having waist long hair, a drunk asked what tribe Dave belonged to. Dave glared at the man and responded with solemn contempt, “Apache.” After defending his thesis, Dave asked his professor, “What kind of job should I pursue, so that, I would still have the energy to write?” The professor’s response was, “As insipid as possible.”

=== After graduate school ===
Dave left Boulder and eventually moved to a cheap apartment in Boston to pursue his writing dreams. He paid rent via a succession of mindless temping jobs. Though necessary for survival, Dave found temping dehumanizing and emasculating. His co-workers (let alone macho plumbers, contractors and electricians) thought he was a loser and something of a “wuss”. When Dave overheard one of them refer to him as “the bitch”, tears of rage welled up in his eyes. “You wouldn’t like me when I’m angry”, Dave muttered, “…because I cry”.

== Analysis ==
David Yoo’s work “The Choke Artist” is reminiscent of the seminal work by Barbara Ehrenreich, Nickel and Dimed, in that, both authors accept menial labor in pursuit of their art. Additionally, Yoo’s work is overlaid with urgent Korean-American immigrant angst, which though presented humorously, nevertheless has a ring of bitter truth, as evident in the quote from Emily Dickinson cited in Yoo’s book, “I like a look of Agony, Because I know it’s true.”

Publishers Weekly opined, “But just as readers are ready to dismiss him as a perennial screw-up, he deftly brings his experiences back to the rawness of his family struggles and he articulates that rarest of memoir experiences: a truly poignant, unexpected epiphany.”

Celeste Headlee of National Public Radio (NPR) commented: “Yale law professor and author, Amy Chua, scored a best seller last year with her memoir, "The Battle Hymn of the Tiger Mother." In it, she describes herself and other so-called Tiger Mothers who go to almost any length to push their kids toward perfection, holding back dinner until she nails that violin cadenza, threatening to put him out for being disobedient or demanding that she get straight As and become a doctor or a lawyer or maybe both.

But, as even Amy Chua found out, not all kids are willing to march to the drum of the tiger mother. Take Korean-American David Yoo. Growing up, he made a point not to study, not to excel at school. Instead, he poured his efforts into trying to fit in with the white kids. How that all turned out is the subject of his memoir. It's called "The Choke Artist: Confessions of a Chronic Underachiever."”
