= Stop Me If You've Heard This One Before =

2008 novel written by David Yoo

- Author: David Yoo
- Language: English
- Genre: Young adult literature
- Publisher: Hyperion Books for Children
- Publication date: 2008
- Publication place: United States
- Media type: Print (hard copy)
- Pages: 374
- ISBN: 978-1-4231-0907-5 (hard copy)
- OCLC: 191931147

Stop Me If You've Heard This One Before is a young adult novel written by David Yoo, and published in 2008. It serves as Yoo's second literary work, following his debut novel Girls For Breakfast, which was released four years prior.

== Plot ==
=== High School ===
"High School" is a fictional narrative focusing on the experiences of Albert Kim, a socially isolated adolescent of Korean descent, following his sophomore year of high school. Written in a coming-of-age style, the story delves into Albert's personal growth and challenges against the backdrop of his summer job at the Bern Inn.

=== Synopsis ===
Upon the conclusion of the academic year, Albert's parents presented him with a choice: engage in a variety of summer activities or secure employment. Opting for the latter, Albert embarked on a journey of self-discovery as he took on a job cleaning rooms at the Bern Inn.

=== The Inn ===
At the Bern Inn, Albert encounters unexpected connections, notably with his classmate Mia Stone. Mia, a popular figure at school, becomes Albert's co-worker, leading to the development of romantic feelings on Albert's part. Despite his social awkwardness, the two bond over shared experiences and gradually embark on a relationship.

=== Ryan's Illness ===
Albert's newfound confidence from his relationship with Mia is tested when Mia's former boyfriend, Ryan Stackhouse, falls ill with cancer. As Ryan's condition deteriorates, Albert observes Ryan's manipulative behavior in attempting to regain Mia's affection. Mia's devotion to Ryan strains her relationship with Albert as she prioritizes her assistance to her ailing ex-boyfriend.

=== The Walk ===
Tensions escalate during a charity event, the Walk for Cancer, where Albert and Ryan engage in a heated confrontation. As the event unfolds, Albert's insensitivity towards Ryan's illness and his competitive spirit culminate in a public altercation, ultimately leading to the dissolution of his relationship with Mia.

=== Conclusion ===
"High School" explores themes of adolescence, social dynamics, and personal growth amidst the backdrop of Albert's experiences during his summer job and the challenges he faces in navigating relationships and adversity.

== Analysis ==
This book is a story of first love. According to protagonist Albert Kim, it is "a traditional love story in the sense that it ends badly." The author tried to present Albert’s desperate attempts to win back his love interest with humor and empathy so that the readers would relate to and root for him.

The book was one of the selections for The Bloomsbury Review’s Editors’ Favorites of 2008.

Additionally, Yoo’s work is overlaid with urgent Korean-American immigrant angst, which though presented humorously, is meant to ring true. To this effect, Yoo quotes from Lucia Berlin, author of The New York Times Bestseller, A Manual for Cleaning Women: “They say a baby’s true baptism occurs when he first falls out of bed.”

== Reception ==
Kirkus delivered a mixed review stating that the "mid-'80s pop-culture references, especially the music, may well be lost on today's teens. This will work best in collections serving large populations of Asian-American teens."
