= Love Zone =

Studio album by Billy Ocean
- Released: 6 May 1986
- Recorded: 1985–1986
- Studio: Battery (London)
- Genres: R&B; soul
- Length: 44:56
- Label: Jive
- Producers: Barry Eastmond; Wayne Brathwaite

Billy Ocean chronology
Suddenly (1984)	Love Zone (1986)	Tear Down These Walls (1988)

Singles from Love Zone
- 1. "When the Going Gets Tough, the Tough Get Going" Released: 15 November 1985; 2. "There'll Be Sad Songs (To Make You Cry)" Released: 22 January 1986; 3. "Love Zone" Released: 5 July 1986; 4. "Love Is Forever" Released: October 1986

Love Zone is the sixth studio album by the British singer Billy Ocean, released on 6 May 1986 by Jive Records. Three singles were released from the album, including Ocean's second US No. 1 single "There'll Be Sad Songs (To Make You Cry)" and the US top ten entry "Love Zone". It also features the UK No. 1 and US No. 2 single "When the Going Gets Tough, the Tough Get Going", which had originally been released as a single from the soundtrack to the 1985 film The Jewel of the Nile.

A critical and commercial success, it became his highest-charting album in both the UK and the US, where it peaked at number two and number six respectively, and has been certified double platinum by the Recording Industry Association of America (RIAA) for shipments of over two million copies.

== Critical reception ==
Professional ratings
Review scores
Source	Rating
AllMusic	4/5 stars
The New York Times	Favourable

Love Zone received favourable reviews from critics. People noted that "Ocean just floats along on this smooth" album and that "the moods [he] creates are so richly romantic they shouldn't be inflicted on the brokenhearted".

The album received a Grammy Award nomination in the category of Best Male R&B Vocal Performance. Ocean also won two American Music Awards, including for Favorite Pop/Rock Single.

== Track listing ==
All tracks are written by Wayne Brathwaite, Barry Eastmond and Billy Ocean, except where noted.

Side one
No.	Title	Writer(s)	Length
1.	"When the Going Gets Tough, the Tough Get Going"	Brathwaite; Eastmond; Robert John "Mutt" Lange; Ocean	5:45
2.	"Love Zone"		5:37
3.	"Without You"		5:03
4.	"There'll Be Sad Songs (To Make You Cry)"		4:55

Side two
No.	Title	Writer(s)	Length
5.	"Bittersweet"		4:58
6.	"It's Never Too Late to Try"	Brathwaite; Eastmond; Ocean; Jolyon Skinner	4:54
7.	"Showdown"	Brathwaite; Eastmond; Ocean; Skinner	4:58
8.	"Promise Me"	Jonathan Butler; Skinner	4:36
9.	"Love Is Forever"		4:15
Total length:			44:56

Bonus tracks on 2011 reissue
No.	Title	Writer(s)	Length
10.	"Love Zone" (extended version)		6:21
11.	"Bittersweet" (extended version)		6:40
12.	"When the Going Gets Tough" (club mix)	Brathwaite; Eastmond; Lange; Ocean	6:46
13.	"There'll Be Sad Songs (To Make You Cry)" (7" version)		4:15

== Production and artwork ==
- Executive producer on track 1 – Robert John "Mutt" Lange
- Producers – Barry J. Eastmond and Wayne Brathwaite
- Engineers – Steve Power (1–7 and 9); Bryan "Chuck" New (track 8)
- Mixing – Nigel Green (tracks 1, 3, 4, 5, 8 and 9); Bryan "Chuck" New (tracks 2, 6 and 7)
- Cover photography – Rob Lee

== Charts ==
=== Weekly charts ===
Weekly chart performance for Love Zone
Chart (1986)	Peak position
Australian Albums (Kent Music Report)	8
Canada Top Albums/CDs (RPM)	3
Dutch Albums (Album Top 100)	7
European Albums (Music & Media)	11
Finnish Albums (Suomen virallinen lista)	9
German Albums (Offizielle Top 100)	33
New Zealand Albums (RMNZ)	8
Norwegian Albums (VG-lista)	3
Swedish Albums (Sverigetopplistan)	7
Swiss Albums (Schweizer Hitparade)	16
UK Albums (Official Charts)	2
US Billboard 200	6
US Top R&B/Hip-Hop Albums (Billboard)	1

=== Year-end charts ===
Year-end chart performance for Love Zone
Chart (1986)	Position
Australian Albums (Kent Music Report)	53
Canada Top Albums/CDs (RPM)	18
Dutch Albums (Album Top 100)	68
European Albums (Music & Media)	61
New Zealand Albums (RMNZ)	48
UK Albums (Gallup)	37
US Billboard 200	31
US Top R&B/Hip-Hop Albums (Billboard)	14

== Certifications ==
Certifications for Love Zone
Region	Certification	Certified units/sales
New Zealand (RMNZ)	Gold	7,500^{^}
United Kingdom (BPI)	Gold	100,000^{^}
United States (RIAA)	2× Platinum	2,000,000^{^}
^{^} Shipments figures based on certification alone.

== See also ==
- List of Billboard number-one R&B albums of 1986
