= Love Is Forever (Billy Ocean song) =

Single by Billy Ocean

from the album Love Zone
- B-side: "Dancefloor"
- Released: October 1986
- Recorded: 1985
- Genre: R&B; soul
- Length: 4:15
- Label: Jive
- Songwriters: Wayne Anton Brathwaite; Barry J. Eastmond; Billy Ocean
- Producers: Barry Eastmond; Wayne Brathwaite

Billy Ocean singles chronology
"Love Zone" (1986)	"Love Is Forever" (1986)	"Love Really Hurts Without You (Dance Remix)" (1986)

"Love Is Forever" is the final track from Love Zone, the 1986 album by Billy Ocean. The song was written by Ocean along with Barry Eastmond and Wayne Braithwaite and was the last of his three number ones on the Adult Contemporary chart. "Love Is Forever" spent three weeks at number one and peaked at number 16 on the Billboard Hot 100. "Love Is Forever" also peaked at number 10 on the R&B chart.

== Charts ==
Chart (1986–1987)	Peak position
Canadian Singles Chart	35
UK Singles Chart	34
US Billboard Hot 100	16
US Hot R&B/Hip-Hop Songs (Billboard)	10
US Adult Contemporary (Billboard)	1
