= Love Zone (song) =

Single by Billy Ocean

from the album Love Zone
- Released: 5 July 1986
- Recorded: 1985
- Genre: R&B, funk
- Length: 5:36 (Album Version); 4:17 (Radio Edit)
- Label: Jive
- Songwriter(s): Wayne Anton Brathwaite, Barry James Eastmond, Billy Ocean
- Producer(s): Barry Eastmond, Wayne Brathwaite

Billy Ocean singles chronology
"There'll Be Sad Songs (To Make You Cry)" (1986)	"Love Zone" (1986)	"Love Is Forever" (1986)

"Love Zone" is the title track from Billy Ocean's 1986 album. In the US, The ballad hit number one on the Billboard R&B chart and was his third single to hit the top spot. "Love Zone" also reached number ten on the Billboard Hot 100 and number five on the Adult Contemporary chart.

== Chart performance ==
=== Weekly charts ===
Chart (1986)	Peak position
Australia (Kent Music Report)	91
Canadian Singles (RPM)	18
New Zealand (Recorded Music NZ)	31
UK Singles (OCC)	49
US Billboard Hot 100	10
US Adult Contemporary (Billboard)	5
US Hot R&B/Hip-Hop Songs (Billboard)	1
West Germany (GfK)	73

=== Year-end charts ===
Chart (1986)	Position
US Adult Contemporary (Billboard)	42
US Hot R&B/Hip-Hop Songs (Billboard)	49

== Popular culture ==
- The song was used for the characters of Tina Lord and Cord Roberts on the American soap opera One Life to Live.
