= There'll Be Sad Songs (To Make You Cry) =

Single by Billy Ocean

from the album Love Zone
- B-side: "If I Should Lose You"
- Released: 22 January 1986
- Recorded: 1986
- Genre: Soul
- Length: 4:55
- Label: Jive
- Songwriters: Billy Ocean; Wayne Brathwaite; Barry Eastmond
- Producers: Barry J. Eastmond; Wayne Brathwaite

Billy Ocean singles chronology
"When the Going Gets Tough, the Tough Get Going" (1986)	"There'll Be Sad Songs (To Make You Cry)" (1986)	"Love Zone" (1986)

"There'll Be Sad Songs (To Make You Cry)" is a song by Trinidadian-English singer Billy Ocean from his sixth studio album, Love Zone (1986). The song was written and produced by Wayne Brathwaite and Barry Eastmond; Ocean was also credited as a co-writer for the song. The song reached number one on the Billboard Hot 100 for the week beginning 5 July 1986, where it remained for one week, becoming the 600th different song to ascend to that position. It also topped the adult contemporary and R&B charts in the United States that same summer.

== Background ==
According to Barry Eastmond, the song was inspired by an incident involving Ocean's single of the previous year, "Suddenly". Eastmond told Fred Bronson in The Billboard Book of Number One Hits about a friend of his wife's who had recently broken up with a long-term boyfriend. While at a party thrown by her new boyfriend, the song "Suddenly", which reminded her of her previous boyfriend, was played, and she broke down in tears. Eastmond and his co-writers used this scenario as the basis for writing "There'll Be Sad Songs (To Make You Cry)".

== Music video ==
Towards the end of the music video for "There'll Be Sad Songs (To Make You Cry)", Ocean stands seeing a woman coming towards him and as he gets ready to hug her, but she walks past him, to his devastation. An alternative video consists of Ocean performing the song live at one of his concerts in 1986.

== Charts ==
=== Weekly charts ===
Weekly chart performance for "There'll Be Sad Songs (To Make You Cry)"
Chart (1986–1987)	Peak position
Australia (Kent Music Report)	10
Belgium (Ultratop 50 Flanders)	9
Canada Top Singles (RPM)	1
Canada Adult Contemporary (RPM)	1
Europe (European Hot 100 Singles)	7
Finland (Suomen virallinen lista)	11
Ireland (IRMA)	15
Netherlands (Dutch Top 40)	8
Netherlands (Single Top 100)	13
New Zealand (Recorded Music NZ)	3
Norway (VG-lista)	9
UK Singles (Official Charts)	12
US Billboard Hot 100	1
US Adult Contemporary (Billboard)	1
US Hot R&B/Hip-Hop Songs (Billboard)	1
US Cash Box Top 100	1
US Black Contemporary Singles (Cash Box)	3
West Germany (GfK)	36

=== Year-end charts ===
Year-end chart performance for "There'll Be Sad Songs (To Make You Cry)"
Chart (1986)	Position
Australia (Kent Music Report)	60
Belgium (Ultratop Flanders)	52
Canada Top Singles (RPM)	33
Netherlands (Dutch Top 40)	60
New Zealand (Recorded Music NZ)	34
US Billboard Hot 100	16
US Adult Contemporary (Billboard)	6
US Hot R&B/Hip-Hop Songs (Billboard)	8
US Cash Box Top 100	4
US Black Contemporary Singles (Cash Box)	23
