= Love Really Hurts Without You =

- A-side label of the original 1976 UK vinyl release

Single by Billy Ocean

from the album Billy Ocean
- B-side: "You're Running Outa Fools"
- Released: 23 January 1976 (UK)
- Recorded: 1975
- Genre: British soul; R&B
- Length: 2:58; 1:56 (faded)
- Label: GTO
- Songwriters: Les Charles, Ben Findon
- Producer: Ben Findon

Billy Ocean singles chronology
"Whose Little Girl are You" (1975)	"Love Really Hurts Without You" (1976)	"L.O.D. (Love on Delivery)" (1976)

"Love Really Hurts Without You" is a song recorded by the British R&B recording artist Billy Ocean. The song – written by Ocean under his real name Leslie Charles with the track's producer Ben Findon – was the second single recorded in the name Billy Ocean (although the singer had had several previous releases using other stage names) and provided Ocean with his first chart record in 1976.

The song reached #2 in the UK Singles Chart. It also became Ocean's first Top 40 hit in the US, reaching number 22 on the Billboard Hot 100.

It remains tied with the 1977 number-two UK hit "Red Light Spells Danger" as his second-highest charting single in the UK, behind "When the Going Gets Tough, the Tough Get Going" which had a four-week run at number one in 1986. It is often cited for its Motown influence.

== Background ==
At the time of his single's success, Ocean was quoted (indirectly) as considering himself "the most surprised person in the world that 'Love Really Hurts Without You' became a hit. It's his tenth release, and he'd got to the point where he assumed his records would be flops." Ocean had been pursuing a singing career in London by 1969, with a stint singing demos at Southern Music Studio on Denmark Street leading to Ocean's working as a studio "gofer" for producer Ben Findon. At the time of his meeting Findon, Ocean was working on the assembly line at Ford Dagenham: (Billy Ocean quote:) "I would do sessions during the day and after I had finished a session I would go work at Ford all through the night. It half killed me, but while I was doing that I met this producer who gave me [the] opportunity [to record 'Love Really Hurts...']." The inaugural collaboration between Ocean and Findon was in fact the 1974 single "On the Run" which was credited to Scorched Earth, after which "Whose Little Girl Are You" became the first single recorded and released (8 August 1975) in the name Billy Ocean.

Ocean had written the original version of "Love Really Hurts Without You" several years earlier while working as a pattern cutter at a fashion house on Savile Row: when a co-worker mentioned that she was selling her piano Ocean impulsively borrowed £23 from his boss to purchase it – (Billy Ocean quote:) "We carried the piano up to the third floor and it fitted perfectly in my little bedroom" (Ocean was living in his parents' council flat off Brick Lane) – and taught himself to play it: (Billy Ocean quote:) "The novelty of it was coming home every lunchtime and evening and tinkling my piano until eventually I did get something out of it which was the song 'Love Really Hurts Without You'. My left hand started playing the melody and my right hand just did some down beats and my voice just started coming out with [the opening lyric] 'You run around town like a fool and you think that it's groovy' and the song just came together there and then." Ocean admitted that his song's tune strongly resembled the Four Tops' 1965 Pop/Soul classic "I Can't Help Myself", which via Donnie Elbert's 1972 remake had been a UK hit at the time of "Love Really Hurts..."' inception .

== Recording and impact ==
After producer Ben Findon touched-up Ocean's composition "Love Really Hurts Without You" was recorded to be released 23 January 1976: debuting at number 34 on the UK Top 50 dated 21 February 1976, the single rose as high as number two on the chart dated 27 March 1976, held off from number one by "Save Your Kisses for Me" by Brotherhood of Man. Billy Ocean said: "I was on the [Ford assembly line] when I heard that song on Radio Luxembourg. I felt so good, because I knew I was free to leave. So I left." "Love Really Hurts Without You" afforded Ocean an international hit with high rankings in national hit parades around the globe: its March 1976 US single release drew a somewhat muted response, the Billboard Hot 100 peak of "Love Really Hurts" being number 22. Ocean would state in 2015: "A few [Americans] might remember 'Love Really Hurts...' because I believe it was a bit of a [US] hit." Ocean would not again place a single on the Hot 100 until 1984 when "Caribbean Queen" would top the chart.

The song was featured on the closing credits of the 2013 film Filth. In 2019, the song was included in the fourth episode of Netflix comedy-drama series Sex Education.

== Charts ==
=== Weekly charts ===
Weekly chart performance for "Love Really Hurts Without You"
Chart (1976)	Peak position
Australia (Kent Music Report)	3
Belgium (Flanders) (VRT Top 30)	7
Belgium (Ultratop 50 Flanders)	6
Belgium (Ultratop 50 Wallonia)	13
Canada RPM100	21
Denmark (IFPI Danmark)	7
Germany (Musikmarkt)	16
Ireland (IRMA)	3
Netherlands (Dutch Top 40)	11
Netherlands (Single Top 100)	11
New Zealand (RIANZ)	13
Norway (VG-lista)	10
Sweden (Topplistan)	9
UK Singles (Official Charts)	2
US Billboard Hot 100	22

=== Year-end charts ===
1976 year-end chart performance for "Love Really Hurts Without You"
Chart (1976)	Position
Australia (Kent Music Report)	19

== Certifications ==
Certifications for "Love Really Hurts Without You"
Region	Certification	Certified units/sales
United Kingdom (BPI)	2× Platinum	1,200,000^{‡}
^{‡} Sales+streaming figures based on certification alone.

== Alex Brown version ==
"Love Really Hurts Without You" is unique among Billy Ocean's twelve Hot 100 hits in that it failed to also rank on the Billboard R&B chart, where Ocean would place an overall total of eighteen singles beginning with the follow-up to "Love Really Hurts...": "L.O.D (Love on Delivery)" (#55 R&B). A major factor in Ocean's "Love Really Hurts..." failing to rank as an R&B hit was that concurrent with the single's US release a cover version by Alex Brown was recorded for the Chelsea Records Roxbury label with John Madara producing. After hearing Alex Brown singing on the sessions for a Wayne Newton album, Chelsea owner Wes Farrell had suggested that she cut "Love Really Hurts..." – (Alex Brown quote:) "We went in the studios that night: it was recorded by midnight and was pressed up and in the shops about three days later."

The Alex Brown version of "Love Really Hurts Without You" debuted on the Hot Soul Singles chart in Billboard dated 8 May 1976 – the week after the Hot 100 debut of the Billy Ocean original – and despite rising no higher than #65 R&B the Alex Brown version evidently satisfied the R&B market demand for "Love Really Hurts..." as the Billy Ocean version was never ranked on the Billboard R&B chart, while ranking on the Cash Box Top 100 R&B chart only for three weeks with a #91 peak reached 1 May 1976 on which chart the Brown cover reached its Cash Box R&B peak of #60. Cash Box also ranked the Alex Brown version of "Love Really Hurts..." in its Looking Ahead to the Top 100 chart of singles in positions #101 – #120 at #107 (24 April 1976) and #120 (1 May 1976). Despite Cash Box improved statistics for Brown's "Love Really Hurts..." as opposed to the single's Billboard stats, the Billy Ocean original was ranked significantly higher on the Cash Box Top 100 than on the Billboard Hot 100 as the Cash Box Top 100 afforded the single a #16 peak, six positions above its best Hot 100 ranking.

== Remixes and remakes ==
In 1986, the song was covered by the pop group Bad Boys Blue for their album Heartbeat and was released as a single, but did not chart.

In November 1986 a remixed version of Billy Ocean's "Love Really Hurts Without You" had a single release which briefly charted in the UK at #81 and which in March 1987 would spend one week on the Netherlands Single Top 100 at #98. On Belgium's Flemish chart – which had afforded the original Ocean version a #6 peak – the 1986 mix of "Love Really Hurts..." rose as high as #21 in January 1987.

"Love Really Hurts..." has since 1987 generated two successful Belgian remakes via two distinct Flemish renderings, the first a thematic departure from the English original: "Met z'n tweetjes", recorded by Bart Kaëll which in 2013 reached #3 on the hit parade rankings for Flemish acts: the track was one of eight new songs included on the Kaëll retrospective album release 30. In 2015 Willy Sommers recorded a more faithful translation of "Love Really Hurts...": "Liefdesverdriet Doet Zo'n Pijn", for his album Gisteren wordt vandaag: (Willy Sommers quote:) "Everyone has had to deal with heartbreak. The song has always appealed to me: despite the sad lyric there's cheer in the upbeat music." Issued as the album's fifth single in March 2015, "Liefdesverdriet..." reached #15 on the hit parade rankings for Flemish acts.

A new remix of Ocean's "Love Really Hurts Without You" was issued in 1994.

The band Madness recorded "Love Really Hurts Without You" in the sessions for The Dangermen Sessions Vol. 1 their 2005 covers album; however, the track was shelved until January 2010 when it served as the B-side for the single release of "Forever Young".

In 2026, Manchester United fans sang a chant parodying the chorus of 'Love Really Hurts Without You" about their midfielder Kobbie Mainoo with the lyrics being "Mainoo, United can't play without you".
