= Billy Ocean (album) =

Studio album by Billy Ocean
- Released: 1976
- Recorded: 1975
- Genres: R&B, disco, soul
- Length: 33:54
- Labels: GTO, Epic
- Producer: Ben Findon

Billy Ocean chronology
Billy Ocean (1976)	City Limit (1979)

Singles from Billy Ocean
- 1. "Love Really Hurts Without You" Released: 23 January 1976

Professional ratings
Review scores
Source	Rating
AllMusic	4/5 stars
The Encyclopedia of Popular Music	2/5 stars

Billy Ocean is the debut studio album by the British recording artist Billy Ocean, released in 1976 by GTO Records. It includes the hit singles "Love Really Hurts Without You", "L.O.D. (Love on Delivery)" and "Stop Me (If You've Heard it All Before)". According to session drummer Paul Robinson, basic tracking was completed over one day. All three songs appeared in the UK Singles Chart in 1976.

== Critical reception ==
Dave Thompson, in Reggae & Caribbean Music, wrote that the album "placed Ocean firmly in a disco-funk-lite vein." The New Rolling Stone Record Guide called the album's single, "Love Really Hurts Without You," "trite radio fodder."

== Track listing ==
All tracks composed by Ben Findon and Leslie Charles; except where indicated

1. "Tell Him to Move Over" (3:26)
2. "Stop Me (If You've Heard it All Before)" (Findon, Charles, Mike Myers) (3:56)
3. "Let's Put Our Emotions in Motion" (3:09)
4. "Let's Do it All Again" (Findon, Charles, Mike Myers) (3:40)
5. "Love Really Hurts Without You" (3:02)
6. "Whose Little Girl are You?" (2:56)
7. "Soul Rock" (Charles, Bob Puzey) (2:38)
8. "One Kiss Away" (2:53)
9. "Hungry for Love" (2:54)
10. "Eye of a Storm" (Findon, Geoff Wilkins) (2:38)
11. "L.O.D. (Love on Delivery)" (2:42)

== Personnel ==
- Billy Ocean – vocals
- Les Thatcher – guitar
- Paul Westwood – bass
- Paul Robinson – drums

Arranged by Ben Findon, Billy Ocean and Graham Preskett
