= Billy Ocean =

Trinidadian–British singer (born 1950)

Billy Ocean MBE
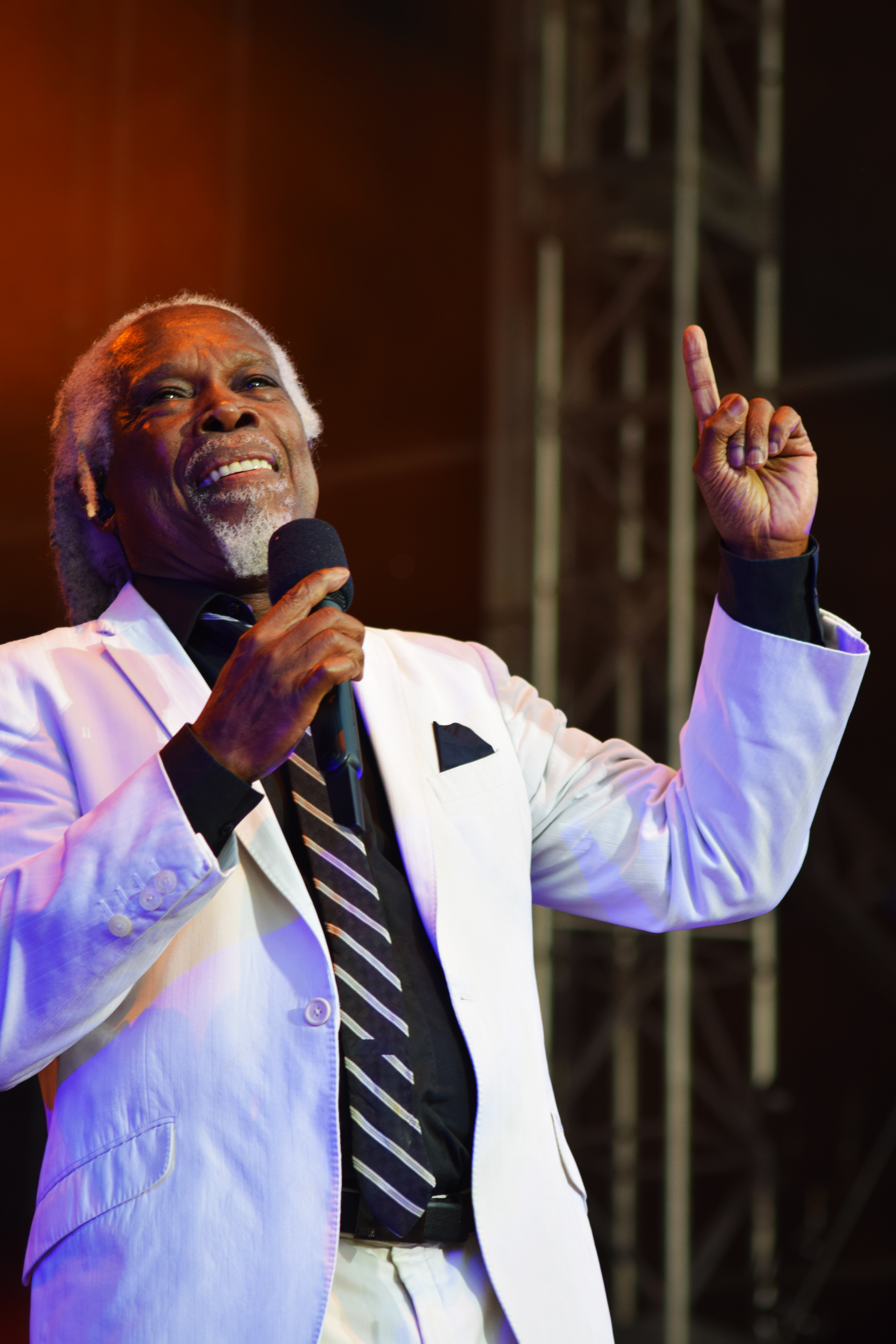
- Ocean at Scarborough Open Air Theatre, 2026

Background information
- Born: Leslie Sebastian Charles; 21 January 1950 (age 76); Fyzabad, Trinidad and Tobago, British West Indies
- Origin: Romford, East London, England
- Genres: R&B; pop; soul; reggae
- Occupations: Singer; songwriter
- Years active: 1969–present
- Labels: GTO; Epic; Jive; Metronome; TLO; Aqua Music; Spark; Sony Music
- Spouse: Judy Charles
- Website: billyocean.com

Leslie Sebastian Charles (born 21 January 1950), known professionally as Billy Ocean, is a Trinidadian-British singer and songwriter. Between 1976 and 1988, he had a series of hit songs in the UK and internationally.

He achieved breakthrough success with the 1976 single "Love Really Hurts Without You". His second single was released under the stage name Billy Ocean, and peaked at no. 2 in the UK and no. 3 in Australia. In 1977, his single "Red Light Spells Danger" also peaked at no. 2. He released the single "Caribbean Queen (No More Love on the Run)" in 1984. In the UK, the song peaked at no. 6. In the U.S., it entered the Billboard Hot 100 at no. 85 but peaked at no. 1 ten weeks later. Ocean won the 1985 Grammy Award for Best Male R&B Vocal Performance for the song. It also charted in Australia, Canada, Ireland, New Zealand, South Africa and across Europe under three different titles. In 1985, "When the Going Gets Tough, the Tough Get Going" peaked at no. 1 in the UK and no. 2 in the U.S. the following year. In July of 1986, he achieved an American no. 1 with the single "There'll Be Sad Songs (To Make You Cry)". In 1988, his single "Get Outta My Dreams, Get into My Car" reached no. 1 in the U.S. and no. 3 in the UK.

In 2010 he received a Lifetime Achievement Award at the MOBO Awards and he was appointed Member of the Order of the British Empire (MBE) in the 2020 New Year Honours for services to music.

== Early life and stardom ==
Ocean was born on 21 January 1950 in Fyzabad, Trinidad and Tobago, to Violet and her husband Hainsley Charles, a Grenadian musician. He moved to Romford, Essex, England, when he was 10 years old, shortly before Trinidad and Tobago became independent in 1962. While also working as a tailor in London's Savile Row he sang regularly in a London nightclub.

He was discovered by his first manager, John Morphew, who recorded a double A-side single at Pye Studios in London with a full orchestra. However, the ballad-singing style of Ocean was going out of fashion, and Morphew was unable to get any major label to release it, so remains unreleased. Ocean's father — who had countersigned the management contract as Ocean was underage — asked Morphew to release him from the recording contract, which he did without penalty. On 3 March 1969, he joined a local London band as lead vocalist, the Shades of Midnight, who were still active in 2024. He left The Shades of Midnight on 20 July 1969 with keyboard player, Les Thompson to form Dry Ice. It was with this band he was discovered by David Myers and John Worsley playing at The Marquis of Salisbury in Balls Pond Road N1. With them the band recorded one of Les Thompson's compositions, "Never", but session musicians were engaged to back Les Charles singing "Nashville Rain", his first single, backed with "Sun in the Morning", in 1971 for Spark Records. Les Charles left Dry Ice in February 1971 and for two years fronted a studio band called Scorched Earth, with whom he released "On The Run" backed with "Super Woman, Super Lover" in 1974.

In an interview with Myf Warhurst on ABC Radio Melbourne, Ocean stated that the story of his stage name being taken from the local Ocean Estate, Stepney in London's East End, where he was living at the time, was incorrect. According to the interview, the name was derived from a local football team that was in his home town in Trinidad and Tobago, who called themselves "Oceans 11".

== International success ==
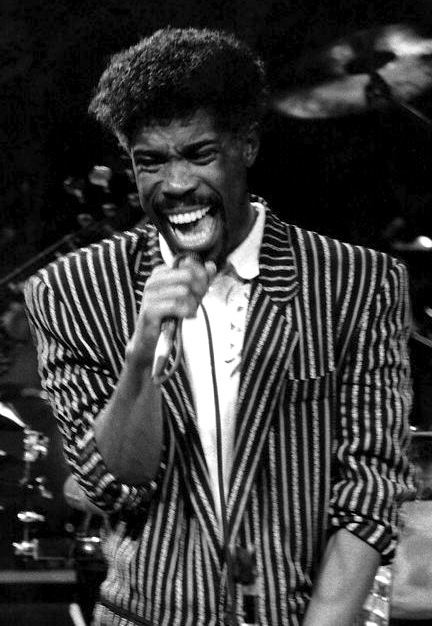
Ocean performing in New York City, 1988

Between 1976 and 1982, Ocean released four studio albums: Billy Ocean (1976), City Limit (1980), Nights (Feel Like Getting Down) (1981) and Inner Feelings (1982) through his record label GTO, none of which scored success on any musical charts, aside from his biggest single up to that point, 1976's "Love Really Hurts Without You", which was a top 40 in the U.S. (no. 22) and a top 10 hit in the UK (no. 2).

As Sony Music acquired GTO Records in 1978, Ocean was shifted to Jive from Epic, in which he received a second breakthrough in his career in the early 1980s. Late 1984 saw the release of his fifth studio album Suddenly and its main single, "Caribbean Queen (No More Love on the Run)", becoming successes on the charts. "Caribbean Queen" became Ocean's first no. 1 single on both the U.S. Billboard Hot 100 and Hot Black Singles charts in late 1984, and the album debuted in the top ten, peaking at no. 9 on both the US Billboard 200 and the UK Albums Chart simultaneously in the U.S. and UK. Suddenly reached gold in the UK, and was certified double platinum by the Recording Industry Association of America (RIAA). He also recorded with Scott Walker in 1984, singing harmony vocals on "Track Three" from Walker's eleventh studio album Climate of Hunter.

“Caribbean Queen” scored Ocean two Grammy Award nominations, and he won the Grammy Award for Best Male R&B Vocal Performance at the 1985 Grammy Awards. Ocean was later presented his award by Jeffrey Daniel of vocal group Shalamar on 620 Soul Train, a UK incarnation of the American musical variety television show Soul Train. The album's title track also became a success, peaking at no. 4 in both the U.S. and the UK. The song "Loverboy" was a no. 2 U.S. success in 1985. Ocean appeared at Live Aid from JFK Stadium in Philadelphia in 1985, singing "Caribbean Queen" and "Loverboy".

His sixth studio album Love Zone (1986) also sold well. It included the successful singles "When the Going Gets Tough, the Tough Get Going", the theme from the film The Jewel of the Nile (1985); this was a no. 1 success in the UK and a no. 2 in the United States; and "There'll Be Sad Songs (To Make You Cry)" (a U.S. no. 1 and a major UK success). Also included were the title track and "Love Is Forever", which were no. 10 and no. 16 U.S. successes for Ocean, respectively. It also earned Ocean a second nomination for Best Male R&B Vocal Performance at the 1987 Grammy Awards.

In February 1986, Ocean's music video for "When the Going Gets Tough, the Tough Get Going" was banned by the BBC, owing to such non-union members as the American actors Michael Douglas, Kathleen Turner and Danny DeVito, all three of whom were cast members of Romancing the Stone (1984) and The Jewel of the Nile (1985), miming to the backing vocals. In 1987, he was nominated for the Brit Award for Best British Male Artist. He was the most popular British R&B singer-songwriter of the early to mid- 1980s.

Tear Down These Walls (1988), Ocean's next studio album, featured the no. 1 single "Get Outta My Dreams, Get into My Car", and the album was certified platinum.

== Later career ==
Ocean's eighth studio album Time to Move On (1993) failed to produce any major successes, but his 1989 Greatest Hits collection has been a steady seller over the years, and his 1997 compilation album L.I.F.E. – Love Is for Ever made no. 7 on the UK Albums Chart. Ocean's last studio album for Jive Records was Time to Move On, which he recorded in Chicago with R&B star R. Kelly.

In 2002, the University of Westminster in London awarded Ocean an honorary doctorate of music. The awards ceremony took place in the Barbican Centre in London. He continues to tour and record in Europe. The Tech Music Schools in London, made up of Drumtech, Vocaltech, Guitar-X and Keyboardtech, Ocean is a patron.

In February and March 2008 he toured Australia and the Far East. His ninth studio album Because I Love You was released on 2 February 2009.

In April 2010, an 18-track compilation album was released in the UK by Sony Music titled The Very Best of Billy Ocean to tie in with a 30-date tour of the UK and Ireland. Featuring Ocean's biggest hits, the album debuted in the UK Albums Chart at no. 17.

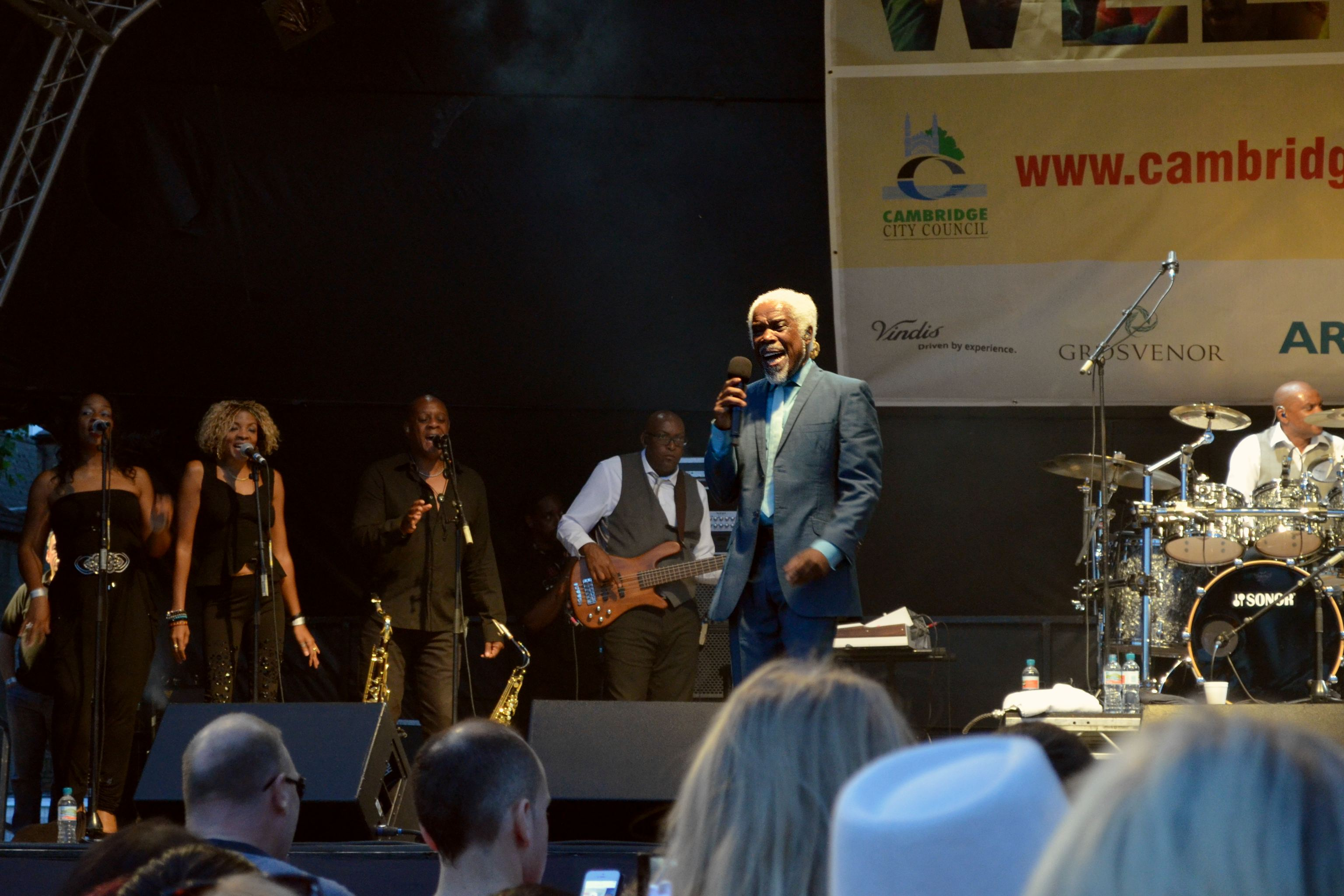
Ocean performing in Cambridge, England, 2014

In October 2007, Ocean commenced his first UK tour in more than 15 years.

On 20 October 2010, Ocean was presented with the Lifetime Achievement Award at the MOBO Awards in London. On 29 July 2011, Ocean became a Companion of the Liverpool Institute for Performing Arts. His title was presented by Paul McCartney.

In 2012, Ocean made a cameo in the British comedy film Keith Lemon: The Film as Lemon's father. In January 2016, Ocean appeared on The Tonight Show with Jimmy Fallon to perform some of his hits as part of a promo tour for his new album. Ocean toured the UK during March and April 2017.

Ocean recorded a new studio album in mid-2019 at Eve Studiosnear Stockport, working again with producer Barry Eastmond as co-writer. The album One World was to be released on 17 April 2020. After a delay, it was later released on 4 September 2020.

== Personal life ==
Ocean has lived in Sunningdale, Berkshire, England, with his wife, Judy, since 1978. They have three children. His son played rugby sevens at the 2014 Commonwealth Games for Barbados.

Ocean decided to become vegetarian after the 1989 death of his mother from ovarian cancer. He is a member of the Rastafari movement.

== Honours, awards and nominations ==
Ocean was appointed Member of the Order of the British Empire (MBE) in the 2020 New Year Honours for services to music.

In 2002 he was presented with an honorary doctorate of music by the University of Westminster. In 2010, he received a Lifetime Achievement Award at the MOBO Awards. The following year, he became a Companion of the Liverpool Institute for Performing Arts.

=== ASCAP Pop Music Awards ===
Year	Nominee / work	Award	Result	Ref.
1986	"Caribbean Queen (No More Love on the Run)"	Most Performed Songs	Won	
1986	"Loverboy"	Most Performed Songs	Won	
1986	"Suddenly"	Most Performed Songs	Won	
1987	"There'll Be Sad Songs (To Make You Cry)"	Most Performed Songs	Won	
1987	"When the Going Gets Tough, the Tough Get Going"	Most Performed Songs	Won	
1988	"Love Is Forever"	Most Performed Songs	Won	
1989	"Get Outta My Dreams, Get into My Car"	Most Performed Songs	Won	

=== Billboard Music Awards ===
Year	Nominee / work	Award	Result	Ref.
1985	Himself	Top R&B Singles Artist	Nominated	
1985	Himself	Top R&B Album Artist	Nominated	
1985	Himself	Top Adult Contemporary Artist	Nominated	
1985	Suddenly	Top R&B Album	Nominated	
1985	"Suddenly"	Top R&B Song	Nominated	
1985	"Suddenly"	Top Adult Contemporary Single	Nominated	
1986	Himself	Top Artist	Nominated	
1986	Himself	Top R&B Artist	Nominated	
1986	Himself	Top R&B Singles Artist	Nominated	
1986	Himself	Top R&B Album Artist	Nominated	
1986	Himself	Top Billboard 200 Artist	Nominated	
1986	Himself	Top Billboard 200 Artist – Male	Nominated	
1986	Himself	Top Hot 100 Artist	Nominated	
1986	Himself	Top Hot 100 Artist – Male	Won	
1986	Himself	Top Adult Contemporary Artist	Won	
1986	Love Zone	Top R&B Album	Nominated	
1986	"There'll Be Sad Songs (To Make You Cry)"	Top Hot 100 Song	Nominated	
1986	"There'll Be Sad Songs (To Make You Cry)"	Top R&B Song	Nominated	
1986	"There'll Be Sad Songs (To Make You Cry)"	Top Adult Contemporary Single	Nominated	
1986	"When the Going Gets Tough"	Top Hot 100 Song	Nominated	
1986	"When the Going Gets Tough"	Top R&B Song	Nominated	
1986	"When the Going Gets Tough"	Top Adult Contemporary Single	Nominated	
1986	"Love Zone"	Top R&B Song	Nominated	
1986	"Love Zone"	Top Adult Contemporary Single	Nominated	

=== Grammy Awards ===
Billy Ocean has been nominated three times for a Grammy Award, with one win.

Year	Nominee / work	Award	Result
1985	"Caribbean Queen (No More Love on the Run)"	Best Male R&B Vocal Performance	Won
1985	"Caribbean Queen (No More Love on the Run)"	Best R&B Song (shared with Keith Diamond)	Nominated
1987	Love Zone	Best Male R&B Vocal Performance	Nominated

=== Ivor Novello Awards ===
Year	Nominee / work	Award	Result
1985	"Caribbean Queen (No More Love on the Run)"	International Hit of the Year	Nominated
1989	"Get Outta My Dreams, Get into My Car"	International Hit of the Year	Nominated
1989	"Get Outta My Dreams, Get into My Car"	Most Performed Work	Nominated
2018	Himself	International Achievement	Won

=== Pollstar Concert Industry Awards ===
Year	Nominee / work	Award	Result	Ref.
1985	Himself	Comeback of the Year	Nominated	

=== Soul Train Music Awards ===
Year	Nominee / work	Award	Result
1987	Love Zone	Album of the Year – Male	Nominated

== Discography ==
=== Studio albums ===
- Billy Ocean (1976)
- City Limit (1980)
- Nights (Feel Like Getting Down) (1981)
- Inner Feelings (1982)
- Suddenly (1984)
- Love Zone (1986)
- Tear Down These Walls (1988)
- Time to Move On (1993)
- Because I Love You (2009)
- Here You Are (2013)
- One World (2020)

== See also ==
- Lists of UK Singles Chart number ones
- List of Billboard number-one singles
- List of artists who reached number one in the United States
- List of Billboard number-one dance club songs
- List of artists who reached number one on the U.S. Dance Club Songs chart
- List of Eastern Caribbean people
