= When the Going Gets Tough, the Tough Get Going (song) =

1985 single by Billy Ocean

- Standard picture sleeve

Single by Billy Ocean

from the album The Jewel of the Nile Soundtrack and Love Zone
- Released: 15 November 1985
- Recorded: 1985
- Genre: Dance-pop
- Length: 5:44 (album version); 4:09 (single/video version)
- Label: Jive
- Songwriters: Wayne Anton Brathwaite; Barry James Eastmond; Mutt Lange; Billy Ocean
- Producers: Barry Eastmond; Wayne Brathwaite

Billy Ocean singles chronology
"The Long and Winding Road" (1985)	"When the Going Gets Tough, the Tough Get Going" (1985)	"There'll Be Sad Songs (To Make You Cry)" (1986)

"When the Going Gets Tough, the Tough Get Going" is a 1985 song co-written and originally recorded by the British singer Billy Ocean in 1985.

== Description ==
Written by Wayne Brathwaite, Barry Eastmond, Mutt Lange and Ocean, the song was used as the theme song for the Michael Douglas and Kathleen Turner film The Jewel of the Nile (1985), a sequel to Romancing the Stone (1984). The saxophone solo is by Vernon Jeffrey Smith.

The song became a major international success, reaching number one on the UK Singles Chart for four weeks in February 1986, and number two on the Billboard Hot 100, stalling behind "How Will I Know" by Whitney Houston. It remains his only number-one single in the UK to date.

The song was later also featured on Ocean's Love Zone album, released in May 1986.

== Music video ==
A music video was shot at Brixton Academy in London, and features Douglas and his Jewel of the Nile co-stars Kathleen Turner and Danny DeVito as lip-synching backing vocalists.

The video was initially banned on Top of the Pops because the actors were not part of the Musicians' Union, meaning DeVito's miming of the saxophone solo went against the rules.

== Critical reception ==
Jerry Smith of the Music Week magazine gave a critical review of "When the Going Gets Tough, the Tough Get Going", stating it was a "very slick US pop number" that "lacks substance and is barely saved by Ocean's strong vocal performance".

== Track listing ==
12-inch single
A1 "When the Going Gets Tough, the Tough Get Going" (Extended Version) – 5:43
A2 "When the Going Gets Tough, the Tough Get Going" (7″ Version) – 4:08
B1 "When the Going Gets Tough, the Tough Get Going" (Club Mix) – 7:35
B2 "When the Going Gets Tough, the Tough Get Going" (Instrumental) – 5:12

Other versions

- 7th Heaven Club Mix – 6:44
- 7th Heaven Radio Edit – 4:22

== Charts ==
=== Weekly charts ===
Weekly chart performance for "When the Going Gets Tough, the Tough Get Going"
Chart (1986)	Peak position
Australia (Kent Music Report)	1
Austria (Ö3 Austria Top 40)	8
Belgium (Ultratop 50 Flanders)	1
Canada Retail Singles (The Record)	2
Canada Top Singles (RPM)	1
Denmark (Tracklisten)	1
Europe (European Hot 100 Singles)	1
Finland (Suomen virallinen lista)	2
France (SNEP)	6
Greece (IFPI)	2
Ireland (IRMA)	1
Italy (Musica e dischi)	16
Netherlands (Dutch Top 40)	1
Netherlands (Single Top 100)	1
New Zealand (Recorded Music NZ)	3
Norway (VG-lista)	1
South Africa (Springbok Radio)	1
Spain (AFYVE)	2
Sweden (Sverigetopplistan)	2
Switzerland (Schweizer Hitparade)	2
UK Singles (Official Charts)	1
US Billboard Hot 100	2
US Adult Contemporary (Billboard)	2
US Dance Club Songs (Billboard)	31
US Dance Singles Sales (Billboard)	19
US Hot R&B/Hip-Hop Songs (Billboard)	6
US Top 100 Singles (Cash Box)	1
US Top 100 Black Contemporary Singles (Cash Box)	8
West Germany (GfK)	2

=== Year-end charts ===
Year-end chart performance for "When the Going Gets Tough, the Tough Get Going"
Chart (1986)	Position
Australia (Kent Music Report)	2
Belgium (Ultratop 50 Flanders)	3
Canada Top Singles (RPM)	14
Europe (European Hot 100 Singles)	2
Netherlands (Dutch Top 40)	1
Netherlands (Single Top 100)	4
New Zealand (RIANZ)	23
South Africa (Springbok Radio)	8
Switzerland (Schweizer Hitparade)	16
UK Singles (Gallup)	7
US Billboard Hot 100	31
US Adult Contemporary (Billboard)	35
US Hot Black Singles (Billboard)	43
US Cash Box Top 100 Singles	32
West Germany (Media Control)	16

== Certifications ==
Certifications for "When the Going Gets Tough, the Tough Get Going"
Region	Certification	Certified units/sales
Belgium (BRMA)	Gold	25,000^{*}
Netherlands (NVPI)	Platinum	100,000^{^}
New Zealand (RMNZ)	Platinum	20,000^{*}
Sweden (GLF)	Gold	25,000^{^}
United Kingdom (BPI)	Platinum	1,000,000^{‡}
^{*} Sales figures based on certification alone.^{^} Shipments figures based on certification alone.^{‡} Sales+streaming figures based on certification alone.

== Boyzone version ==
"When the Going Gets Tough"

Single by Boyzone

from the album By Request
- B-side: "What a Wonderful World" (by Alison Moyet); "Love Can Build a Bridge" (by Cher, Chrissie Hynde and Neneh Cherry)
- Released: 1 March 1999
- Length: 3:38
- Label: Polydor
- Songwriters: Wayne Brathwaite; Barry Eastmond; Robert John Lange; Billy Ocean
- Producer: Steve Mac

Boyzone singles chronology
"I Love the Way You Love Me" (1998)	"When the Going Gets Tough" (1999)	"You Needed Me" (1999)

Music video
- "When the Going Gets Tough" on YouTube

Irish boy band Boyzone recorded a cover version for the 1999 Comic Relief telethon, shortening the title to "When the Going Gets Tough". Like the original, their version also reached number one on the UK Singles Chart for two weeks, becoming their fifth chart-topper and receiving a platinum certification in the UK. The video included Graham Norton, Jo Brand, Phill Jupitus, Mel Smith, Davina McCall, Harry Hill, Steve Collins, John McCririck, Jimmy White, Mystic Meg, Will Mellor, James Dreyfus, the cast of Emmerdale, Adam Buxton and Joe Cornish, and Ulrika Jonsson and Saracen from Gladiators.

=== Track listings ===
UK CD single

1. "When the Going Gets Tough"
2. "What a Wonderful World" (performed by Alison Moyet)
3. "Love Can Build a Bridge" (documentary track—performed by Cher, Chrissie Hynde and Neneh Cherry)

UK cassette single

1. "When the Going Gets Tough"
2. "What a Wonderful World" (performed by Alison Moyet)

French CD single

1. "When the Going Gets Tough" – 3:35
2. "I'll Never Not Need You" – 4:07

=== Personnel ===
Personnel are lifted from the By Request album booklet.

Main personnel

- Wayne Brathwaite – writing
- Barry Eastmond – writing
- Robert John Lange – writing
- Billy Ocean – writing
- Wayne Hector – additional backing vocals
- Andy Caine – additional backing vocals
- Tracy Ackerman – additional backing vocals
- Paul Gendler – guitars
- Steve Mac – production, mixing
- Chris Laws – engineering, programming
- Matt Howe – mix engineering

Orchestra

- Guy Barker – trumpet
- Phil Todd – saxophone
- Ann Morfee – violin
- Ian Humphries – violin
- Rebecca Hirsch – violin
- Nicolette Humphries – violin
- Helen Paterson – violin
- Richard George – violin
- Clare Thompson – violin
- Anna Hemery – violin
- Laura Melhuish – violin
- Steve Morris – violin
- Deborah Widdup – violin
- Gillian Kent – violin
- Clare Finnimore – viola
- Bruce White – viola
- Paul Martin – viola
- Sue Dench – viola
- Nick Cooper – cello
- Jonathan Tunnell – cello
- Audrey Riley – cello
- Emma Black – cello
- Richard Niles – string and brass arrangement
- Graeme Perkins – orchestra contractor

=== Charts ===
==== Weekly charts ====
Weekly chart performance for "When the Going Gets Tough"
Chart (1999)	Peak position
Estonia (Eesti Top 20)	10
Europe (Eurochart Hot 100 Singles)	7
Europe (European Hit Radio)	37
France (SNEP)	71
Iceland (Íslenski Listinn Topp 40)	25
Ireland (IRMA)	2
Italy Airplay (Music & Media)	17
Scottish Singles Sales (Official Charts)	1
Spain Airplay (Top 40 Radio)	14
UK Singles (Official Charts)	1
UK Airplay (Music Week)	5

==== Year-end charts ====
Year-end chart performance for "When the Going Gets Tough"
Chart (1999)	Position
Romania (Romanian Top 100)	35
UK Singles (OCC)	10

=== Certifications ===
Certifications for "When the Going Gets Tough"
Region	Certification	Certified units/sales
United Kingdom (BPI)	Platinum	767,000

=== Release history ===
Release dates and formats for "When the Going Gets Tough"
Region	Date	Format(s)	Label(s)	Ref.
United Kingdom	1 March 1999	CD; cassette	Polydor	
Japan	19 May 1999	CD	Polydor	
