= Bus Stop (band) =

British dance music group from 1998 to 2002

- Origin: London, England
- Genres: Dance; Eurodance; pop rap
- Years active: 1998–2002
- Label: EMI
- Members: Darren Sampson (Daz Sampson); Graham Turner; Mark Hall; Nikki Reid (Lane)

Bus Stop (known in North America as London Bus Stop) was a British dance act made up of Darren Sampson, alongside Graham Turner, Mark Hall and Nikki Reid (Lane). The group was formed in 1998 and had a string of hit singles before disbanding in 2002. Main vocalist, Sampson, went on to represent the UK in the 2006 Eurovision Song Contest.

== Career ==
Starting in 1998, Bus Stop released a series of cover version singles, the most successful being the 1998 single "Kung Fu Fighting" which reached No. 8 on the UK Singles Chart. Bus Stop's remake featured the vocals of the original artist, Carl Douglas. The sampled song added original rap lyrics, a style they would use in later hits as well.

After the success of "Kung Fu Fighting", the group released three further remakes, "You Ain't Seen Nothin' Yet" that featured Randy Bachman, a dance version of Van Halen's "Jump" and "Get It On" that featured T. Rex. Other releases included remakes of "Footloose", "Na-Na", "Kick the Can", "Swing It", "One Two (Little Bitch)" and "Long Train Runnin'". In addition to their single releases, the group was featured on many tracks in the Dancemania series. They disbanded in 2002.

== After the break-up ==
Graham Turner and Mark Hall went on to form as a duo known as Flip & Fill. They produced and remixed electric dance music and were signed to All Around The World Record Label. Having released tracks since 2000, they reached No. 34 in the UK Singles Chart in March 2001 with "True Love Never Dies", based on a mash-up of "Airwave" by Rank 1 and Donna Williams' "True Love Never Dies", with re-recorded vocals by Kelly Llorenna. Remixed and re-released, it reached No. 7 in February 2002.

In addition to Kelly Llorenna, Karen Parry has also provided vocals for the act, including on their 2002 No. 3 UK hit, "Shooting Star" Jo James is another singer who provided vocals for their releases, "Field of Dreams" and a remix of the Whitney Houston hit "I Wanna Dance with Somebody". They have also produced a remix of Ayumi Hamasaki's song "July 1st" which peaked at No. 3 on Japan's Oricon album chart.

Band member and Bus Stops's main vocalist Daz Sampson went on to represent the United Kingdom at the Eurovision Song Contest 2006 with "Teenage Life". He has also had chart success as part of Fraud Squad (with JJ Mason), Rikki & Daz (with Ricardo Autobahn), with Barndance Boys (also with Matthews) and in Uniting Nations (with Paul Keenan).

== Members ==
- Darren Sampson
- Graham Turner
- Mark Hall
- Nikki Reid (Lane)

== Discography ==
=== Albums ===
- Ticket to Ride (1998)
- Get It On (2000)
- Bustin' Rhymes & Melodies (2002)

=== Singles ===
List of singles, with selected chart positions
Year	Title	Peak chart positions		Original / interpolated artist
Year	Title	UK	AUS	Original / interpolated artist
1998	"Kung Fu Fighting" (feat. Carl Douglas)	8	15	Originally by Carl Douglas
1998	"You Ain't Seen Nothin' Yet" (feat. Randy Bachman)	22	28	Originally by Bachman-Turner Overdrive
1999	"Jump"	23	78	Originally by Van Halen
2000	"Get It On" (feat. T. Rex)	59	—	Originally by T. Rex
2000	"One Two (Little Bitch)"	—	—	Remake of "Little Bitch" by the Specials
2000	"Footloose"	—	—	Originally by Kenny Loggins
2001	"Kick the Can"	—	—	Remake of music played in the "Can-can", composed by Jacques Offenbach
2001	"Na-Na"	—	—	Remake of "Na Na Hey Hey Kiss Him Goodbye" by Steam
2001	"Swing It"	—	—	Remake of "Tequila" by Danny Flores and the Champs
2001	"Long Train Runnin'"	—	—	Originally by the Doobie Brothers
"—" denotes releases that did not chart.

=== Video games ===
Bus Stop has a total of six songs which appear in the Dance Dance Revolution arcade series. Although Bus Stop is absent in Dance Dance Revolution SuperNova series and Dance Dance Revolution X, "Long Train Runnin'" was included in a cover by X-Treme.

Song	Arcade game												
Song	1st	2nd	3rd	Bass	2000	4th	5th	MAX2	Ex	X3	2013	2014	A
"Kung Fu Fighting"	Yes	Yes	Yes			Yes				Yes	Yes	Not in USA location test	Removed on May 30, 2016
"Kung Fu Fighting (Miami Booty Mix)"				Yes	Yes								
"Kick the Can"						Yes	Yes						
"One Two (Little Bitch)"						Yes	Yes						
"Na-Na"						4thMix Plus only	Yes						
"Swing It"							Yes						
"Long Train Runnin'"								Yes	Yes				

== Compilation appearances ==
=== Dancemania ===
- Dancemania Delux 3 - "Jump" (1999)
- Dancemania Speed 2 - "Jump" (1999)
- Dancemania X1 - "Jump" (1999)
- Dancemania Delux 4 - "Kick the Can" (2000)
- Dancemania Euro*Mix Happy Paradise - "Na-Na (B4 Za Beat Mix)" (2000)
- Dancemania Speed Best 2001 Hyper Nonstop Megamix - "Jump (Fast Mix)" and "Kick the Can (Hyper KCP Mix)" (2000)
- Dancemania BASS #8 - "Rock You" (2000)
- Dancemania 21 - "Long Train Runnin'" (2001)
- Dancemania Bass #10 Super Best 1998-2001 - "Kung-Fu Fighting (Miami Booty Mix)" (2001)
- Dancemania Speed 7 - "Footloose (Hyper Mix)" (2001)
- Dancemania X8 - "Footloose" (2001)
- Dancemania X9 - "Up & Down" (2001)
- Classical Speed 1 - "Orphee Aux Enfers [Kick the Can]" (2002)
- Dancemania 22: Energy Overload - "Owner of a Lonely Heart" (2002)
- Dancemania Best Yellow - "Jump" and "Long Train Runnin'" (2002)
- Dancemania Speed 8 - "Long Train Runnin' (Ventura Mix)" (2002)
- Dancemania Speed 9 - "Na-Na (KCP Remix)" (2002)
- Dancemania EX2 - "Let the Music Play" (2003)
- Dancemania Hyper Delux - "Long Train Runnin'" (2003)
