= Western Ware =

Studio album by Hyperbubble
- Released: March 7, 2017
- Recorded: July 1, 2016
- Studio: Rehearsal Room Studios, Nashville, Tennessee, 2002, Glen Campbell's home, Phoenix, Arizona, February 19, 2016, San Antonio Museum of Art, San Antonio, Texas
- Genre: Synth-pop, electropop
- Length: 29:48
- Language: English
- Label: Fellowshipwreck
- Producer: Jess and Jeff DeCuir

Hyperbubble chronology
| Music to Color By (2016) | Western Ware (2017) |

Western Ware is an album by the American synth-pop/electropop band Hyperbubble from Fellowshipwreck released on February 26, 2017. An aim of the collection was to follow through on the promise of band member Jess DeCuir to "plan to produce, mix and create the first electro Country & Western LP" since the work of Gil Trythall. One reviewer noted that the recording also marked a change for Hyperbubble in that while Jess is regarded as "the voice of band, ...on this album Jeff (DeCuir) cleans up rather nicely as lead vocalist on a good number of tracks."

The album includes Aleah Metzger Hendricks on all backing vocals for "Queen of the Roller Derby" and adding backing vocals to four other tracks. Their cover of "Rhinestone Cowboy" features Rikki & Daz's John Matthews (Ricardo Autobahn) accompanying on synthesizer and Daz Sampson as MC. Their contribution was recorded at Glen Campbell's home at the time they recorded their own UK Top 20 version of the hit song.

Most tracks cover popular songs by noted country music artists with two exceptions. One is the short track "Luminaria," recorded live at the San Antonio Museum of Art during the citywide event of the same name.

The second is the debut of "Digital Cowboy," the title track composed but never produced by Our Daughter's Wedding for their 1981 album. For this song, Our Daughter's Wedding member Scott Simon performs with Hyperbubble on lead synthesizer.

The album title incidentally copies that of a single Hyperbubble previously recorded for a 2011 compilation entitled Western, produced by Winter Records.

== Critical reception ==
The release was called "a rare crossover" Country and Western album that "is synthpop at its core;" "a wild west of urban cowboys, honkey-tonk angels and truck-driving women." Through "a hoedown of bouncy and bombastic country-western covers," band members Jess and Jeff DeCuir dubbed "electronic music's own Carter & Cash" eschew the "twang and wail of traditional country instruments." As a substitute "on the 'Nashville in the 23rd Century' rendition of 'Boney Fingers,' Jess DeCuir's theremin is a most perfect Country instrument as it hauntingly twangs." Pansentient League reviewer Jer White wrote that "Hyperbubble are fast becoming the masters of conceptual synthpop, what with this delightful album and things like last year's synthpop coloring book Music to Color By."

Their "The Electric Horseman" was described as "a meaty take on the instrumental from the Robert Redford film of the same name" and that it represents an "extended (version) from the original which incidentally also featured a sequencer line." Chain D.L.K. gave the album 3 out of 5 stars and Pansentient League named it a Top Ten for 2017.

== Track listing ==
| No. | Title | Writer(s) | Guest musician(s) | Length |
|---|---|---|---|---|
| 1. | "Y'all Come" | Arlie Duff | Aleah Metzger Hendricks | 2:01 |
| 2. | "Jolene" | Dolly Parton | | 2:42 |
| 3. | "Boney Fingers" | Hoyt Axton, Renee Armand | | 2:51 |
| 4. | "Truck Driving Woman" | Roland Pike, Johnny Wilson | Aleah Metzger Hendricks | 2:01 |
| 5. | "Luminaria" | Jeff DeCuir | | 0:16 |
| 6. | "Bar Wars" | Buzz Cason | | 2:55 |
| 7. | "Queen of the Roller Derby (featuring Aleah Metzger Hendricks)" | Leon Russell | Aleah Metzger Hendricks | 2:30 |
| 8. | "Rhinestone Cowboy (featuring Rikki and Daz)" | Larry Weiss | Rikki & Daz | 3:05 |
| 9. | "Digital Cowboy (featuring Scott Simon)" | Keith Silva, Scott Simon, Layne Rico | Scott Simon, Aleah Metzger Hendricks | 1:26 |
| 10. | "The Rubber Room" | Porter Wagoner | Aleah Metzger Hendricks | 3:27 |
| 11. | "The Electric Horseman" | Dave Grusin | | 6:34 |

== Personnel ==
=== Musicians ===
- Jess DeCuir – lead vocals, synthesizers, theremin, stylophone
- Jeff DeCuir – lead vocals, sequencer, synthesizers, drumtronics

=== Additional personnel ===
- Aleah Metzger Hendricks – vocals
- Scott Simon – synthesizer
- Daz Sampson – MC
- John Matthews – synthesizer

=== Production ===
- Producers – Jess and Jeff DeCuir
- Head engineer – Hyperbubble
- Engineer for Daz Sampson vocals – Ricardo Autobahn
- Photography – Hyperbubble, Joe Wallace
