= Spray (duo) =

UK musical duo

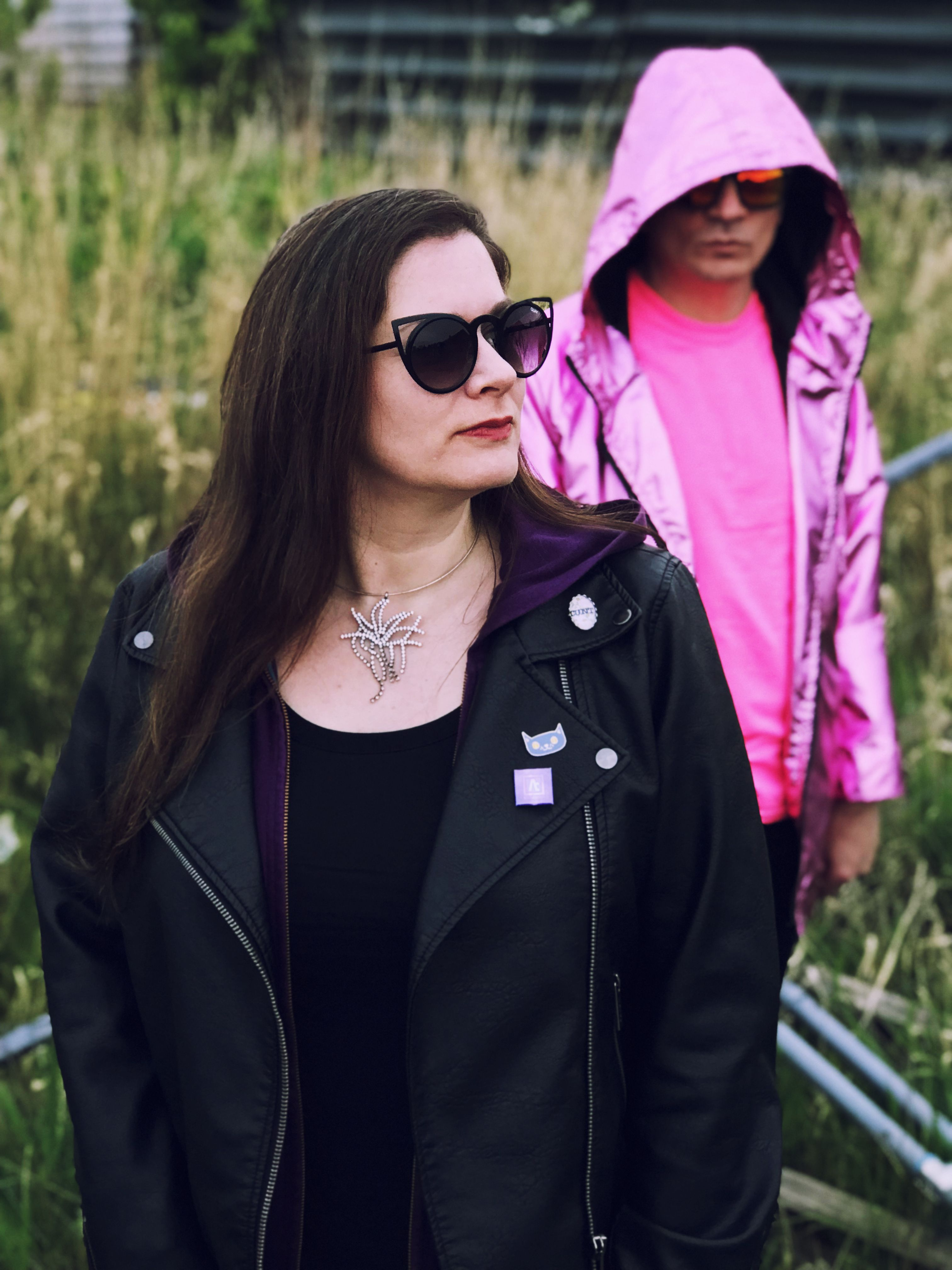
- Jenny McLaren & Ricardo Autobahn, pictured as Spray in 2019

Background information
- Origin: Rotherham, South Yorkshire, England
- Genres: Synth-pop
- Years active: 2001–present
- Labels: Ninthwave Records; Banoffeesound; AnalogueTrash
- Spinoff of: Cuban Boys
- Members: Ricardo Autobahn; Jenny McLaren

Spray is a synth-pop duo from Preston, Lancashire, England, consisting of siblings Jenny McLaren and Ricardo Autobahn. Following the demise of their previous band, the Cuban Boys (famous for their Hampster Dance record and John Peel sessions), McLaren and Autobahn released the album Living In Neon on Ninthwave Records in the United States. This was followed in 2003 by the extended single "I Am Gothic". A new album, Children of a Laser God was released online in 2006, along with the single "Run With Us", a cover of the theme tune of the popular 1980's cartoon The Raccoons with the "Michael Trenfield" remix as the main single accompanied with the original version and remixes from JKZ, Absorb, FMU and Diskowarp.

After a hiatus, the duo returned in 2010 with the single "Everything's Better With Muppets", accompanied by a popular YouTube video containing excerpts from The Muppet Show lipsynching with the song.

Amongst other projects, Spray were partially responsible for the 2002 remake of Rhinestone Cowboy by Rikki & Daz, top 40 kids band the Barndance Boys, and "The Woah Song" by DJ Daz (Daz Sampson). McLaren has a successful sideline in vocalising club/dance records, and Autobahn in soundtracks and commercials. The band has also had one of their singles, "I Am Gothic", appear in the Xbox game Dance Dance Revolution Ultramix 3.

Spray's 2016 release, Enforced Fun, released on the Banoffeesound label, featured narration on its opening track "The Prologue" by actress and singer Jane Badler and collaborations on other tracks with artists like Kid Kasio and Hyperbubble. A version available by electronic download through Bandcamp included instrumental versions of the tracks and a bumper sticker. Their fourth album Failure Is Inevitable was released in May 2019 on Analogue Trash, as was 2021's Ambiguous Poems About Death and 2023's album of cover versions Songs Already Sung.

== Discography ==
=== Albums ===
Album cover for Living In Neon

- Living in Neon (2002)
- Children of a Laser God (2006)
- The Difficult Third Album (2014), compilation, Banoffeesound
- Enforced Fun (2016), Banoffeesound
- Failure Is Inevitable (2019), Analogue Trash
- Ambiguous Poems About Death (2021), Analogue Trash
- Songs Already Sung (2023), Analogue Trash

=== EPs ===
- We're Nihilists, Not Stylists (EP) (2011)
- We Are Gothic (EP) (2016)
- Anthologised By Cherry Red (EP) (2018)
- Offerings from the Algorithm (EP) (2020)

=== Singles ===
- "I am Gothic" (Remix Project) (2003)
- "Run with Us" (2006)
- "He Came with the Sleigh" (2007)
- "Singing for England 2010" (2010)
- "Everything's Better with Muppets" (2010)
- "Manga Eyes" (2014)
- "It's Not Enough" (with Kid Kasio) (2016)
- "Félicette (Space Cat)" - 7" vinyl (2021)
- "Diamond Lights - Get Normal" (2022)
- "The Big Idea" (2023)
- "(Ich Bin Verliebt) In Den Ampelmann" (2024)
