= Uniting Nations =

British dance music act formed in 2004

- Origin: Liverpool, England
- Genres: Funky house, nu-disco
- Years active: 2004–2008, 2019–present
- Labels: Gut Records, JF Productions
- Members: Daz Sampson; Nona; Paul Keenan
- Past members: Craig Powell; Jinian Wilde

Uniting Nations are a British dance music act formed in Liverpool in 2004. They achieved chart success across Europe. The act was originally made up of Paul Keenan and Daz Sampson as band members, songwriters and producers. After their 2005 hit "Out of Touch", which was the debut and most successful single of the band, Craig Powell joined in as frontman of the band. A number of songs on the Uniting Nations' debut and only album One World, released in 2005 on Gut Records, were also performed by vocalist and session artist Jinian Wilde.

The band had chart success with two initial UK hits, "Out of Touch" and "You and Me". The band's third hit, "Ai No Corrida", a remake of the 1980 song by British musician Chaz Jankel (which was covered by American producer Quincy Jones on his 1981 album The Dude), featured the vocals of British singer and dancer Laura More. Craig Powell left in March 2006, after the release of the One World album, with the band releasing various recordings until 2008.

In April 2019, the act was revived with Daz Sampson and British singer Nona and recorded a new single called "This Love", a cover of the 1986 song "Is This Love" by American band Survivor. It was released on 14 February 2020 on label JF Productions. The act were also working on a new album.

== Career ==
The biggest hit for Uniting Nations was their debut hit "Out of Touch", a cover of Hall & Oates. The video for the song featured the actor Paul Spicer. The single stayed on the UK Singles Chart for 21 weeks, peaking at number 7. It also peaked at number 5 in Ireland, number 8 in Norway, number 9 in Finland and the Netherlands. It also charted in Australia, Austria, Germany, Sweden and Switzerland.

Uniting Nations' follow-up single was "You and Me". The song was written by the band members. The video for the song featured frontman Craig Powell. Powell also performed the songs live in Uniting Nations performances including on Top of the Pops. The single peaked at #15 in the UK charts. It also reached #3 in Finland, #16 in Denmark, also charting in Ireland and Sweden.

Their third single from the album was "Ai No Corrida", which featured the vocals of Laura More and backing vocals of Steve M. Smith and Yolanda Quartey. The single had its UK release on 7 November 2005 which was made to coincide with the band's release of the album. The cover reached the UK Top 20, peaking at #18.

Following the success of the singles on the British charts, the album One World was released on 14 November 2005, and included twelve tracks. The album track "She's Special" carried the vocals of Donovan Blackwood. The album also included an additional extended version of "Out of Touch" titled "Out of Touch (I Love You So Much)", five a cappellas of the album songs and two short samples. Uniting Nations also released various a cappellas as DJ tools and samples for use by remixers. Smash Hits readers and T4 viewers voted Uniting Nations as "Best Dance Act" at their last ever Pollwinners Party in 2005.

Craig Powell left the band in March 2006 for a solo career, with several TV performances as a single released in 2010; he then became a professional mixed martial arts competitor and opened his own gym.

Uniting Nations then released songs that included "Music in Me" and the promotional "High Energy" in 2006 and a fourth official single called "Do It Yourself" in 2007, a cover of American singer Gloria Gaynor's 1975 song of the same name. The band took a break in 2010 to concentrate on writing and producing for other established acts.

== Revival ==
In April 2019, the act was revived with Daz Sampson and British singer Nona and recorded a new single called "This Love", a cover of the 1986 song "Is This Love" by American band Survivor. It was released on 14 February 2020 on label JF Productions. The act were also working on a new album.

== Discography ==
=== Albums ===
- One World (2005)

=== Singles ===
List of singles, with selected chart positions, showing year released and album name
Title	Year	Peak chart positions										Album
Title	Year	UK	AUS	DEN	FIN	GER	IRE	NLD	NOR	SWE	SWI	Album
"Out of Touch"	2004	7	41	—	9	27	5	32	8	26	74	One World
"You and Me"	2005	15	59	—	14	—	26	62	—	—	—	One World
"Ai No Corrida" (featuring Laura More)	2005	18	—	16	3	—	37	—	—	43	—	One World
"Music in Me"	2006	—	—	—	—	—	—	—	—	—	—	One World
"High Energy" (promo)	2006	—	—	—	—	—	—	—	—	—	—	Non-album singles
"Do It Yourself (Go Out and Get It)"	2007	64	—	—	—	—	—	—	—	—	—	Non-album singles
"Pressure Us" (featuring Lucia Horn)	2008	—	—	—	—	—	—	—	—	—	—	Non-album singles
"This Love"	2020	—	—	—	—	—	—	—	—	—	—	Non-album singles
"—" denotes a recording that did not chart or was not released in that territory.

== In popular culture ==
- British-Japanese media artist Danny Choo used the Jon Dixon remix of Uniting Nations' song "Ai no Corrida" in his 2007 Tokyo Dance Trooper in Shibuya viral video in Shibuya, Tokyo.

== See also ==
- Rikki & Daz
- Bus Stop
