= One World (Uniting Nations album) =

Studio album by Uniting Nations
- Released: November 14, 2005
- Genre: Eurodance; electronic; house
- Length: 49:07
- Label: Gusto
- Producer: Daz Sampson; Paul Keenan

Singles from One World
- 1. "Out of Touch" Released: November 15, 2004; 2. "You and Me" Released: 25 July 2005; 3. "Ai No Corrida" Released: 7 November 2005

One World is the debut studio album by UK-based dance group Uniting Nations. It was released on November 14, 2005 under Gusto Records.

Prior to the release of the album on November 14, 2005, Uniting Nations had seen chart success with two consecutive singles, the debut "Out of Touch" (a Hall & Oates cover song) and the follow-up "You and Me" that both reached respectively #7 and #15 on the UK charts.

The third single taken off the album, "Ai No Corrida", that came with the release of the album itself, featured the vocal talents of Laura More (of Eric Prydz' "Call on Me" fame) and peaked at #18 in the charts.

== Track listing ==
- 1. "Out of Touch" - 2:48
- 2. "You and Me" - 3:06
- 3. "She's Special" - 3:21
- 4. "Music in Me" - 2:40
- 5. "Tonight (In the City)" - 3:12
- 6. "Ai No Corrida" - 2:47
- 7. "Loving You" - 3:08
- 8. "Feels Like Heaven" - 3:13
- 9. "Make Love" - 2:52
- 10. "We're Gonna Make It" - 2:36
- 11. "Destiny" - 3:18
- 12. "Blues and Twos" - 3:40
- 13. "Out of Touch (I Love You So Much)" (Extended Version) - 7:40

Uniting Nations DJ Tools

- 14. "Music in Me (Acapella)" - 0:24
- 15. "Tonight (In the City) (Acapella)" - 0:52
- 16. "Loving You (Acapella)" - 0:51
- 17. "Feels Like Heaven (Acapella)" - 1:19
- 18. "Make Love (Acapella)" 0:39
- 19. Drum Sample - 0:13
- 20. Funky Guitar Sample - 0:17

Enhanced CD version section

- 21. "Out of Touch" music video
- 22. "You and Me" music video
- 23. "Ai No Corrida" music video

== Credits ==
- Artwork by – Jo Lane
- Mastered by – Chris Potter
- Performers
  - All tracks (all instruments (except "Ai No Corrida")) – Daz Sampson, Paul Keenan
  - For "Ai No Corroda" -
    - Miles Martin (bass)
    - Rob Harris (guitar)
    - Ben Somers (saxophone)
    - Neil Waters (trumpets)
    - Hal Ritson (keyboards and recorded by [Sample])
- Photography – Kirsty Barton and John Dawson
- Producers – Daz Sampson, Paul Keenan
  - Producer [Original] – Essex Buddha (for "Ai No Corrida")
  - Engineer [Vocals]) - Andy Parker (for "Ai No Corrida)
  - Producer [Sample Replay] – Hal Ritson
- Recorded vocals –
  - Jinian Wilde (9 main tracks and all acappellas)
  - Craig Powell
  - Donovan Blackwood (for "She's Special")
  - Laura More [featuring] (for "Ai No Corrida")
  - Steve M. Smith, Yolanda Quartey [backing vocals] (for "Ai No Corrida")
- Written by –
  - Daz Sampson (tracks: 2 to 13)
  - Paul Keenan (tracks 2 to 13)
  - Chaz Jankel ("Ai No Corrida")
  - Kenny Young ("Ai No Corrida")
  - Daryl Hall ("Out of Touch" and "Out of Touch (I Love You So Much)"
  - John Oates ("Out of Touch" and "Out of Touch (I Love You So Much)"
