= Teenage Life =

2006 Daz Sampson song

Single by Daz Sampson
- Released: 2006
- Songwriters: John Matthews; Daz Sampson

Eurovision Song Contest 2006 entry
- Country: United Kingdom
- Artist: Daz Sampson
- Language: English
- Composers: John Matthews; Daz Sampson
- Lyricists: John Matthews; Daz Sampson

Finals performance
- Final result: 19th
- Final points: 25

Entry chronology
- ◄ "Touch My Fire" (2005)
- "Flying the Flag (For You)" (2007) ►

"Teenage Life" is a song written by John Matthews and Daz Sampson, and performed by Daz Sampson himself. It represented the United Kingdom in the Eurovision Song Contest 2006.

On 4 March 2006, Sampson had won the BBC show Making Your Mind Up with the song "Teenage Life", which was written and produced with John Matthews (a.k.a. Ricardo Autobahn) of the Cuban Boys, who were responsible for the Hampster Dance hit "Cognoscenti vs. Intelligentsia" in 1999. Released on 8 May 2006, the song entered the UK Singles Chart on 14 May 2006, reaching the top 10 the following week and peaking at number 8.

== At Eurovision ==
As a result of winning Making Your Mind Up, Sampson represented the UK in the Eurovision Song Contest on 20 May 2006 in Athens, but only 10 of the 39 eligible countries voted for him and his total score was 25 points, placing him 19th out of the 24 acts (winning act Lordi from Finland, amassed 292 points).

The backing vocalists on "Teenage Life" were five young women, Emily Reed, Holly, Leeanne, Ashlee and Gabriella singing as well as dancing, depicted as school girls in a school-themed song and lyrics. Although four of the five girls were just amateurs applying for the song, the fifth member, Emily Reed had taken part in A Song for Europe, the selection process for representing UK in the Eurovision Song Contest in 2003. She had been one of four finalists, singing "Help Me", finishing second to Jemini with the song "Cry Baby". Reed landed the fifth position as a replacement vocalist when it was decided one of the original qualifying amateur girls, Jessica, could not take part for various reasons, including her age.

In the BBC's 2013 documentary How to Win Eurovision, Sampson admitted: "Rap may not be the best of ideas and maybe Europe was not ready for Daz Sampson."

== Track listing ==
1. "Teenage Life" (radio edit) (3:02)
2. "Teenage Life" (Uniting Nations remix) (6:48)
3. "Teenage Life" (JJ Mason remix) (5:40)
4. "Teenage Life" (Paul Keenan remix) (6:37)
5. "Teenage Life" (Rap-A-Long mix) (3:02)

== Charts ==
=== Weekly charts ===
Chart (2006)	Peak position
UK Singles (Official Charts)	8

=== Year-end charts ===
Chart (2006)	Position
UK Singles (OCC)	147

Preceded by "Touch My Fire" by Javine	United Kingdom in the Eurovision Song Contest; 2006	Succeeded by "Flying the Flag (For You)" by Scooch
