= Ai No Corrida (song) =

1980 single by Chaz Jankel

Single by Chaz Jankel

from the album Chas Jankel
- B-side: "Lenta Latina"
- Released: 10 August 1980
- Recorded: 1980
- Genre: Funk; soul; disco
- Length: 4:07 (single version); 9:10 (album version)
- Label: A&M
- Songwriters: Chaz Jankel; Kenny Young
- Producer: Chaz Jankel

Chaz Jankel singles chronology
"One Morning One Evening" (1974)	"Ai No Corrida" (1980)	"Am I Honest With Myself Really?" (1981)

"Ai No Corrida" (lit. Bullfight of Love) is a song by the English singer and multi-instrumentalist Chaz Jankel, written by Jankel and Kenny Young. The title is based on the Japanese title of the erotic art film In the Realm of the Senses (1976). It was first recorded in 1980 and featured on Chaz Jankel's debut studio album Chas Jankel for A&M Records.

Quincy Jones's 1981 recording of the song was a top 30 hit in the United States, and won the Grammy Award for Best Arrangement, Instrumental and Vocals in 1982.

== Original version and name origin ==
"Ai No Corrida" is a song written by Chaz Jankel and Kenny Young, first recorded in 1980 and featured on Jankel's self-titled debut album for A&M Records. Ai (愛) is the Japanese word for "love", while Corrida is the Spanish word for "bullfight", but in Spanish youth slang, can also be a term for male ejaculation.

=== Charts ===
Chart (1981)	Peak position
Belgium (Ultratop 50 Flanders)	18

== Quincy Jones version ==
"Ai No Corrida"

Single by Quincy Jones

from the album The Dude
- B-side: "There's a Train Leavin'"
- Released: April 1981
- Recorded: 1981
- Genre: Disco; R&B; soul
- Length: 6:26
- Label: A&M
- Songwriters: Chaz Jankel; Kenny Young
- Producer: Quincy Jones

Quincy Jones singles chronology
"Stuff Like That" (1978)	"Ai No Corrida" (1981)	"Just Once" (1981)

Music video
- "Ai No Corrida" on YouTube

The song was covered by Quincy Jones in 1981 on his album The Dude, with vocals by Dune (a.k.a. Charles May) and Patti Austin. Jones's version peaked at number 28 on the U.S. Billboard Hot 100 and number 10 on the R&B chart. In the UK, it peaked at number 14 in May 1981.

=== Awards ===
Jerry Hey and Jones received the 1982 Grammy Award for Best Instrumental Arrangement Accompanying Vocalist(s) for their recording of this song.

=== Personnel ===
- Charles May – lead vocal
- Steve Lukather – guitar, guitar solo
- Louis Johnson – bass guitar, hand claps
- John Robinson – drums, hand claps
- Paulinho da Costa – percussion, mouth percussion
- Herbie Hancock – electric piano
- David "Hawk" Wolinski – clavinet
- Ian Underwood – synthesizer, synthesizer programming
- Greg Phillinganes – synthesizer, hand claps
- Patti Austin – background vocals, vocal arrangement
- Tom Bahler – background vocals
- Jim Gilstrap – background vocals
- Jerry Hey – horn arrangement, trumpet, synthesizer arrangement
- Chuck Findley – trumpet
- Bill Reichenbach Jr. – trombone
- Kim Hutchcroft – saxophone
- Ernie Watts – saxophone, tenor saxophone solo
- Quincy Jones – vocal arrangement, rhythm arrangement, synthesizer arrangement
- Craig Huxley – beam-microtonal tubules

=== Chart performance ===
Chart (1981)	Peak position
Australia (Kent Music Report)	74
Austria (Ö3 Austria Top 40)	20
Germany (GfK)	28
Ireland (IRMA)	23
Japanese foreign singles chart (Oricon)	1
Sweden (Sverigetopplistan)	16
UK Singles (OCC)	14
US Billboard Hot 100	28
US Hot R&B/Hip-Hop Songs (Billboard)	10
US Billboard Disco/Dance	5

== Uniting Nations version ==
"Ai No Corrida"

Single by Uniting Nations featuring Laura More

from the album One World
- Released: 7 November 2005
- Length: 3:10 (radio edit)
- Label: Gusto
- Songwriters: Chaz Jankel; Kenny Young
- Producers: Paul Keenan; Daz Sampson

Uniting Nations singles chronology
"You and Me" (2005)	"Ai No Corrida" (2005)	"Music in Me" (2006)

Laura More singles chronology
"Ai No Corrida" (2005)

Music video
- "Ai No Corrida" on YouTube

British dance music act Uniting Nations released the song as their third single from the band album One World after the success of "Out of Touch" and "You and Me".

The song featured the vocals of Laura More of Eric Prydz and "Call On Me" fame. The backing vocals are from Steve M. Smith and Yolanda Quartey. The song was produced by Essex Buddha, with Hal Ritson as sample replay producer, and came in 12-inch vinyl, in enhanced CD (which included the video).

=== Track listings ===
12-inch single

A. Ai No Corrida (Sharp Boys dub) (7:44)
B. Ai No Corrida (Uniting Nations extended mix) (6:02)

CD single

1. "Ai No Corrida" (Uniting Nations radio edit) (2:49)
2. "Ai No Corrida" (original radio edit) (3:10)
3. "Ai No Corrida" (Uniting Nations extended mix) (6:01)
4. "Ai No Corrida" (Sharp Boys club mix) (7:43)
5. "Ai No Corrida" (video)

=== Charts ===
Chart (2005–2006)	Peak position
Denmark (Tracklisten)	16
Finland (Suomen virallinen lista)	3
Hungary (Dance Top 40)	9
Hungary (Rádiós Top 40)	14
Ireland (IRMA)	37
Scotland Singles (OCC)	14
Sweden (Sverigetopplistan)	43
UK Singles (OCC)	18

== Other versions ==
Jones also recorded a Spanish-language version for the 2006 charity album Rhythms del mundo, with vocals by Vania Borges.

In Japan, 1981, a Japanese-language version was released by RVC, performed by Japanese unit BIG BANG (Yoshifumi Oba, Yoshihiko Shiraishi, Katsumi Takeichi, Shunji Inoue), produced by Koichi Fujita.
