= Festive Fifty =

British alternative annual music chart

The Festive Fifty was originally an annual list of the year's 50 best songs compiled at the end of the year and voted for by listeners to John Peel's BBC Radio 1 show. After Peel's death, the tradition of the Festive Fifty was continued, first by other Radio 1 DJs, and then, by the Dandelion Radio.

== History ==
The first Festive Fifty was broadcast in 1976 and differed in format to later charts with listeners voting on their all-time favourite songs. It was topped by Led Zeppelin's "Stairway to Heaven" from 1971. The following year, the list was selected by Peel himself from his favourite songs of 1977.

In 1982, the shift to a strictly annual chart was made. In the early 1980s post-punk records by bands such as Joy Division and The Cocteau Twins featured heavily in the chart. In the mid and later 1980s indie bands began to gain recognition with The Smiths making many appearances.

Throughout the 90s and early 2000s, artists like The Fall, PJ Harvey, Hefner, The Wedding Present, Cuban Boys and Pulp would appear prominently.

After John Peel died in 2004, the chart for that year was played by Rob Da Bank and was topped by The Fall. Huw Stephens from Radio 1's One Music strand, the original replacement for Peel's show, joined fellow One Music presenter Rob Da Bank for the chart for 2005.

In 2006, after One Music was removed from the Radio 1 schedule, the Festive Fifty was discontinued. Peel's former production team, however, invited the internet radio station Dandelion Radio to take up the compilation and broadcast of the Festive Fifty, which they have done since 2006. The first chart of the Dandelion Radio era was topped by Tall Boy's "I'm Your Boyfriend Now," and included artists like Los Campesinos!, Camera Obscura, Mogwai, and others.

Subsequent years have seen the charts include a mix of groups who had appeared during Peel's original charts, like The Cure, Half Biscuit, Darren Hayman (Hefner / The French), Cuban Boys, and Prolapse, and contemporary artists including Wet Leg, Geese, Frog, Tiberius, Allo Darlin', Benjamin Shaw, Burial, Cloud, Battles, Girl Band, and Courtney Barnett.

== Festive 50 number ones ==
Year	Artist	Song	Nation
1976^{[N1]}	Led Zeppelin	"Stairway to Heaven"	England
1977	The Motors	"Dancing the Night Away"	England
1978^{[N1]}	Sex Pistols	"Anarchy in the U.K."	England
1979 ^{[N1}	Sex Pistols	"Anarchy in the U.K."	England
1980^{[N1]}	Sex Pistols	"Anarchy in the U.K."	England
1981^{[N1]}	Joy Division	"Atmosphere"	England
1982^{[N1]}	Sex Pistols	"Anarchy in the U.K."	England
1982	New Order	"Temptation"	England
1983	New Order	"Blue Monday"	England
1984	The Smiths	"How Soon is Now?"	England
1985	The Jesus and Mary Chain	"Never Understand"	Scotland
1986	The Smiths	"There Is a Light That Never Goes Out"	England
1987	The Sugarcubes	"Birthday"	Iceland
1988	The House of Love	"Destroy the Heart"	England
1989	The Sundays	"Can't Be Sure"	England
1990	The Fall	"Bill is Dead"	England
1991	Nirvana	"Smells Like Teen Spirit"	United States
1992	Bang Bang Machine	"Geek Love"	England
1993	Chumbawamba and Credit to the Nation	"Enough is Enough"	England
1994	Inspiral Carpets and Mark E. Smith	"I Want You"	England
1995	Pulp	"Common People"	England
1996	Kenickie	"Come Out 2 Nite"	England
1997	Cornershop	"Brimful of Asha"	England
1998	The Delgados	"Pull the Wires from the Wall"	Scotland
1999	Cuban Boys	"Cognoscenti vs. Intelligentsia"	England
2000^{[N1]}	Joy Division	"Atmosphere"	England
2000	Neko Case & Her Boyfriends	"Twist the Knife"	United States
2001	Melys	"Chinese Whispers"	Wales
2002	Saloon	"Girls Are the New Boys"	England
2003	Cinerama	"Don't Touch That Dial"	England
2004	The Fall	"Theme from Sparta F.C. #2"	England
2005	Jegsy Dodd	"Grumpy Old Men"	England
2006	Tall Pony	"I'm Your Boyfriend Now"	England
2007	Battles	"Atlas"	United States
2008	The Fall	"50-Year Old Man"	England
2009	Los Campesinos!	"There Are Listed Buildings"	Wales
2010	Standard Fare	"Philadelphia"	England
2011	PJ Harvey	"Let England Shake"	England
2012	Savages	"Husbands"	England
2013	The Wedding Present	"Two Bridges"	England
2014	Cuban Boys	"The Nation Needs You (2014 Version)"	England
2015	Girl Band	"Paul"	Ireland
2016	David Bowie	"Blackstar"	England
2017	Paul Rooney	"Lost High Street"	England
2018	Idles	"Danny Nedelko"	England
2019	"Astro-B"	"Hellow I Love U"	England
2020	Idles	"Mr. Motivator"	England
2021	Wet Leg	"Chaise Longue"	England
2022	Fontaines D.C.	"Jackie Down the Line"	Ireland
2023	Yard Act	"The Trench Coat Museum"	England
2024	Fontaines D.C.	"Starburster"	Ireland
2025	Prolapse (band)	"On The Quarter Days"	England

Note 1: All-time list
