= Towey =

Towey is a surname. Notable people with the surname include:

- Cal Towey (born 1990), American baseball player
- Frank William Towey, Jr. (1895–1979), American lawyer and politician
- Gearoid Towey (born 1977), Irish Olympic athlete
- Jim Towey, American government executive
- John Towey (born 1940), American actor and director
- Paul Towey, member of the band Tall Pony
