= Ricardo Autobahn =

Ricardo Autobahn (John Matthews)
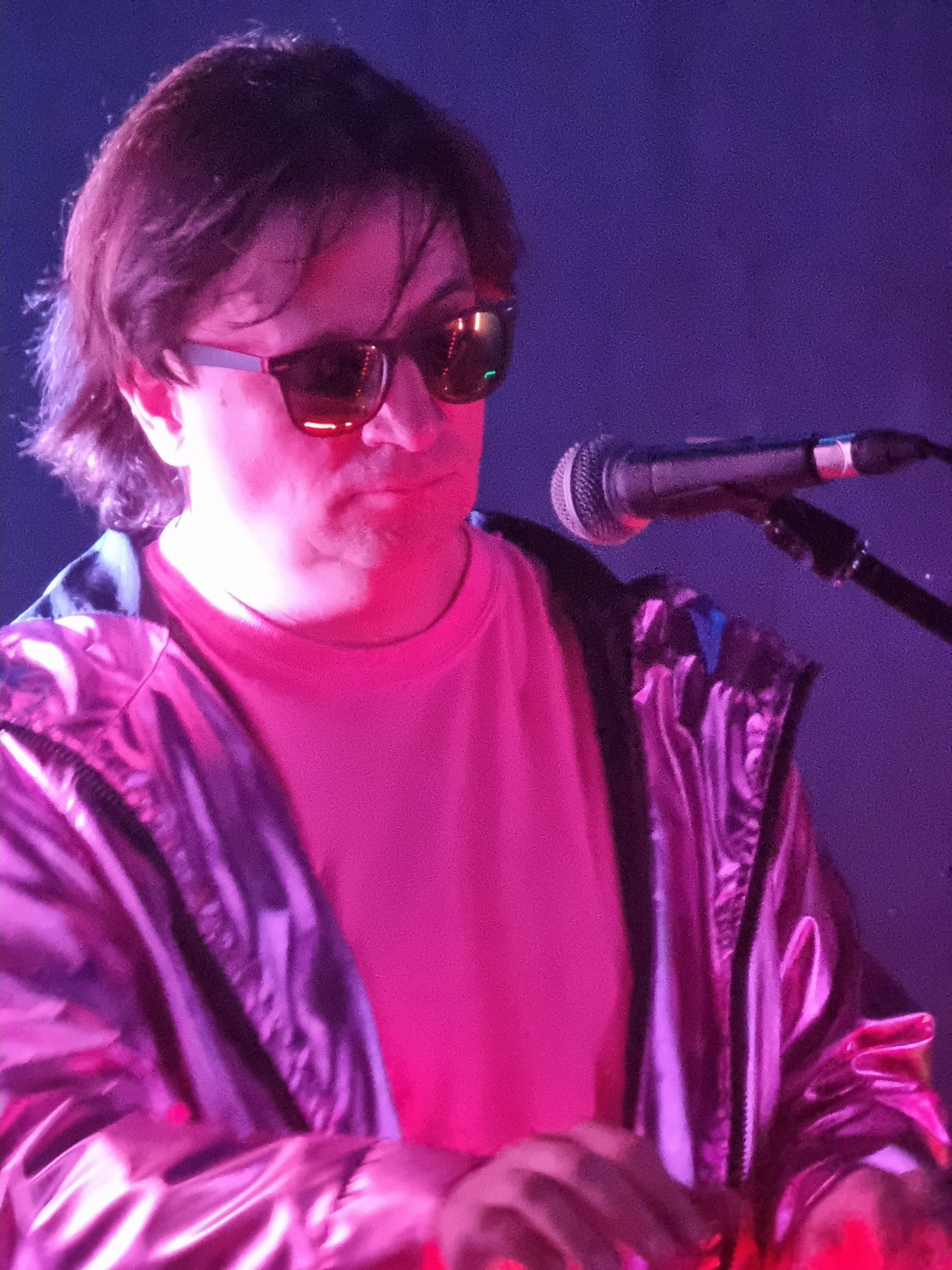

Background information
- Also known as: Rikki (in Rikki & Daz)
- Born: John Woodrow Matthews; 8 March 1978 (age 48)
- Genres: Pop, hip hop, dance, Europop
- Website: www.ricardoautobahn.co.uk

John Woodrow Matthews (born 8 March 1978), better known by his stage name Ricardo Autobahn, is an English producer, songwriter and musician. He is also known in collaborations with Daz Sampson as in Rikki & Daz and the projects like Barndance Boys, Cuban Boys, and his current project Spray.

== Career ==
Matthews is a member of the band Spray and earlier in the Cuban Boys. The latter was most famous for their UK Christmas hit “Cognoscenti vs. Intelligentsia”. The band allowed their label to market "Cognoscenti vs. Intelligentsia" as "The Hampster Dance Song".

In addition, Matthews was Rikki in the duo Rikki & Daz (with Daz Sampson), who also recorded under the name of the Barndance Boys. Rikki & Daz scored a UK top 20 hit with their version of the song "Rhinestone Cowboy", involving Glen Campbell who re-recorded his vocal and appeared in the video. The Barndance Boys, infamous for their papier mache heads, had a top 40 hit in 2003 with "Yippie-I-Oh". With Daz Sampson, Matthews co-wrote and produced the UK's 2006 Eurovision entry "Teenage Life" with Daz Sampson and the European hit "The Woah Song" by DJ Daz.

In 2006, Matthews co-wrote and co-produced the eponymous debut album for US electro artist Lolly Pop. He was also involved in Pop Inc, known for their single "Looking 4 The KLF". In 2008 he formed the musical project called Attery Squash, who had their single "Devo Was Right About Everything" remixed by Devo members Robert & Gerald Casale

In 2009, Matthews released a video on YouTube called "The Golden Age of Video". This was a mash-up of video clips from various TV Shows and movies. In 2012, he collaborated on a Christmas single release titled "And The Salvation Army Band Plays" with Helen Love, and playing keyboards with the band. Matthews also co-founded Pound Shop Boys with Phil Fletcher, performing covers of theme tunes to children's television programmes in the style of the Pet Shop Boys.

As a remixer and producer, Ricardo Autobahn has remixed Becky's dance single, "Less Than Three", The Crimea's "Loop a Loop", along with singles by Nathalie Archangel, Jane Badler and Christopher Anton. He co-produced vocalist/performer Brooke R. Calder's on-stage personae Lolly Pop in collaboration with Minneapolis producers Monte Moir and Doctor Fink.

In 2014, Matthews joined the band Helen Love to play keyboards for a number of dates, including at Primavera Sound in Spain. He also remixed Helen Love's "Pogo Pogo".

== Discography (solo) ==
=== Albums ===
- 2007: Interrobang (Ninthwave Records)
- 2013: Rasterscan (Ninthwave Records)
- 2016: Panophobia (Banoffeesound)
- 2019: Check The Gyroscopes (Banoffeesound)
- 2025: Music For Bus Stations (Banoffeesound)
- 2026: World Car Explosion (Banoffeesound)

== Discography (bands and collaborations) ==
=== Albums ===
in Cuban Boys

- Eastwood, EMI (2000)
- The Satellite Junkyard, House of Beauty / self-published (2008)
- Art vs Commerce - The Singles Collection, House of Beauty / self-published (2010)

in Spray

- Living in Neon (2002)
- Children of a Laser God (2006)
- The Difficult Third Album (2013)
- Enforced Fun (2016)
- Failure Is Inevitable (2019)
- Ambiguous Poems About Death (2021)
- Songs Already Sung (2023)

=== Singles ===
in Cuban Boys

(for a comprehensive listing, see discography section in Cuban Boys

- "Cognoscenti Vs. Intelligentsia", EMI (1999)

in Rikki & Daz

- "Rhinestone Cowboy" featuring Glen Campbell (2002)
- "Chihuahua" (Rikki & Daz Vs. JJ Mason Remix) (remix, 2003)

in Barndance Boys

- "Yippie-i-oh" (2003)

in Spray

- "I Am Gothic" (Remix Project) (2003)
- "Run With Us" (2006)
- "He Came With The Sleigh" (Christmas 2007)
- "Singing For England 2010" (Summer 2010)
- "Everything's Better With Muppets" (Autumn 2010)
- "We're Nihilists, Not Stylists (EP)" (Summer 2011)

in Pop Inc

- "Looking for the KLF" (Ricardo Otobahn Edit) (2009)

in The Kunts

- "Prince Andrew Is a Sweaty Nonce" (Ricardo Autobahn Remix) (remix, 2022)
- "Fuck The Tories" (Ricardo Autobahn Remix) (remix 2022)

== Compositions ==
- 2006: "Teenage Life" (co-writer of Daz Sampson's Eurovision song)
- 2019: "Kinky Boots" (co-writer of Daz Sampson's Eurovision song)
- 2019: "ALFSplaining theme"

== See also ==
- Rikki & Daz
- Spray
- Cuban Boys
- Daz Sampson
- Lolly Pop
