= The Tip Sheet =

British music magazine

The Tip Sheet (1993–2002) was a weekly music magazine, exclusively sold to UK music industry insiders. The magazine was founded by Jonathan King, who also served as its managing editor until his imprisonment in 2001 for child sex offences. After his imprisonment, his brother Andy King took over the position, initially helped by Joe Taylor. Taylor and fellow employee Paul Scaife left the magazine to launch Record of the Day in 2003.

From 1998 to 2001, the magazine was bundled with a CD, compiled and mastered by Phil Kerby at Audio Edit Productions.

During its run, The Tip Sheet allegedly promoted artists including The Corrs, The Darkness and Eva Cassidy while they were unsigned or unknown, and also allegedly drew attention to future hits, including Chumbawamba's Tubthumping, the Cuban Boys's Cognoscenti Vs. Intelligentsia and the Baha Men's Who Let the Dogs Out?. Currently, the only evidence to support this are several unsubstantiated claims by King himself.

In 2006, after Orson's debut single and debut album topped the UK charts, King claimed that a 2005 entry on The Tip Sheet's messageboard secured the band a major-label contract and promoted the band to stardom. This claim was publicly disputed by Creation Records founder Alan McGee, who expressed "pity" towards Orson and criticised King for "still [being] as deluded as he was in 2001".

The Tip Sheet has not been printed since 2002. The magazine's online forum continued for several years after, before being quietly shuttered sometime before 2011.
