= Jinian Wilde =

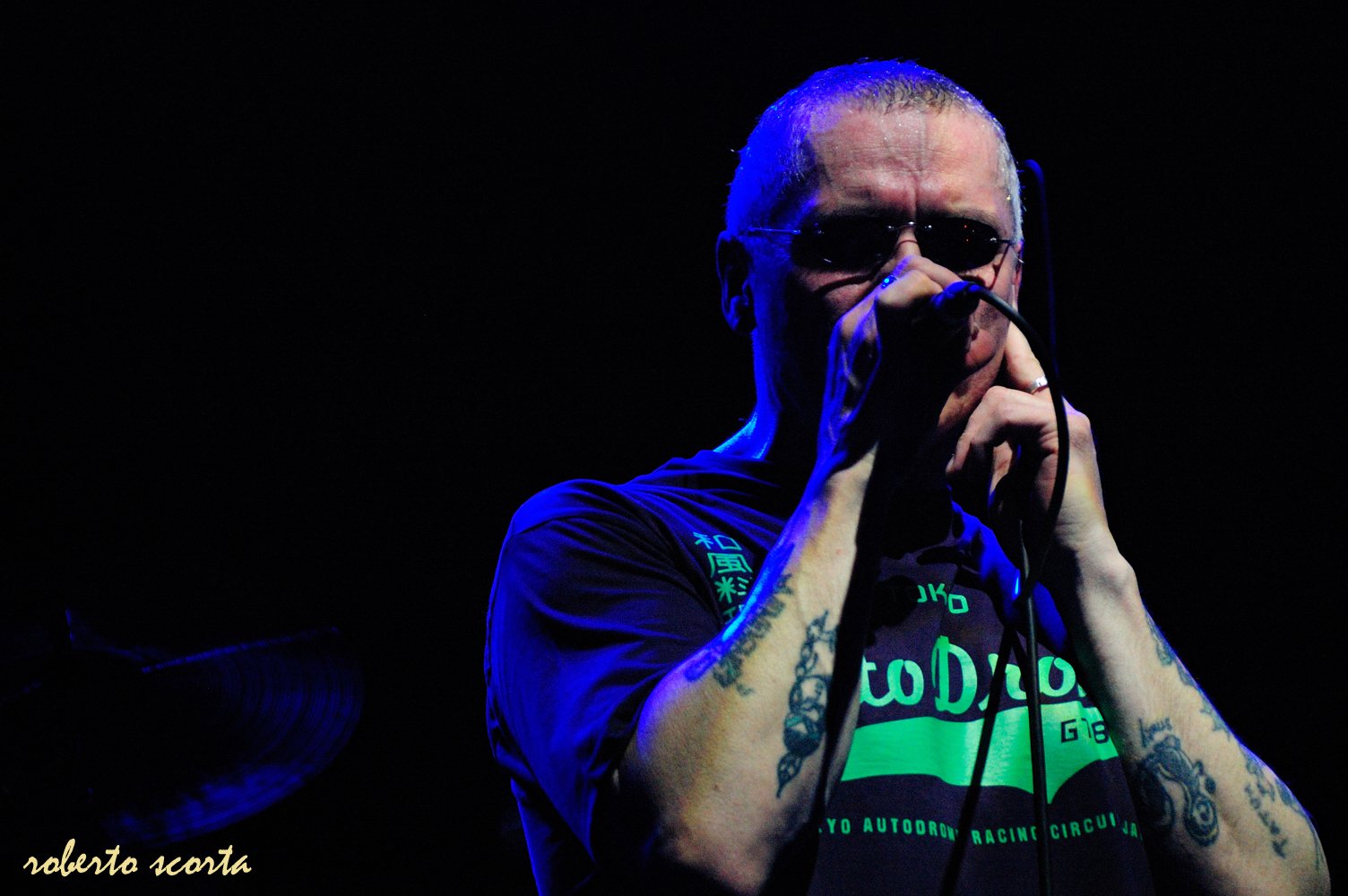

Background information
- Also known as: Jin Wilde, Wilde!
- Born: London, England
- Occupations: Singer, songwriter
- Instrument: Vocals
- Years active: 2002–present

Jinian Wilde, sometimes Jin Wilde and Wilde!, is an English singer, songwriter, studio vocalist, vocal instructor and musician who has worked with a number of musical projects and with UK's Paris Music. He is also founder of Wilde Rose Studio using the name Dr. VoX. He has collaborated most notably with Uniting Nations, Daz Sampson and since 2007 is lead singer in the David Cross Band, a band formed by David Cross who was the electric violinist of King Crimson.

== Career ==
In 1998 Wilde performed lead vocals and rhythm guitar with Mercy Brown (aka The Mighty Mercy Brown).

In 2002 Wilde performed lead and backing vocals on Space Cowboy's "I Would Die 4 U (Extended Club Mix)", a remake of the Prince song. He performed lead vocals for the song alongside Nick Dresti (Space Cowboy) and his band on Top of the Pops. Wilde also released a cover of PhD's "I Won't Let You Down" under the alias Wilde! on Hi-Bias Records in 2004, and was credited for vocals and keyboards/programming. He has also performed on many remake tracks with David Gainsford of Paris Music, including Axwell's hit "I Love U", a dance version of the David Bowie's "Life on Mars?" (Paris Music Remix) and on "You".

Wilde is best known for his vocal work with English dance act Uniting Nations. During 2004 and 2005, he performed lead and backing vocals on a number of the group's international hits including "Out of Touch" (UK No. 7), "You & Me" (No. 15) and also on "Music in Me", "Tonight (in the City)", "Loving You", "Feels Like Heaven", "Make Love", "Destiny" and a cappella versions of five Uniting Nations tracks that featured on the group's album One World.

In 2006 Wilde continued collaborating with Uniting Nations' member Daz Sampson in his DJ Daz project, performing vocals and backing vocals on "The Whoa Song" and receiving credit as Jin Wilde. The track was released on Ebul/Sony BMG. 14th Precinct also sampled the Uniting Nations track "All Out of Love (Dance Remix)" and used the Jinian Wilde vocals. The song was used as the theme song for the American television series Cagney & Lacey.

Wilde was also featured on One Track Mind's song "Voices", a remake of The Police track and on Emma J's "When I'm Gone". Other credits include guitar and programming on Bass Monkeys track "Beautiful (Thrill Bill)" and lead vocals on Castle Avenue's debut single "When I am Gone", produced by Soulshaker and licensed in the UK and through Yummie Records in the Benelux territory. He also sings on four tracks on Small World Incident's album End.
