= Moving Windows =

Studio album by Our Daughter's Wedding (ODW)
- Released: 1982
- Studio: Intergalactic Studio and Electric Lady Studios, both New York
- Genre: New wave; synth-pop
- Label: EMI America
- Producer: David Spradley; Frank Simon; ODW

Our Daughter's Wedding (ODW) chronology
Digital Cowboy (1981)	Moving Windows (1982)

Singles from Moving Windows
- 1. "Auto Music" Released: 1982; 2. "Elevate Her" Released: 1982

Moving Windows is the second and final studio album by American synth-pop trio Our Daughter's Wedding (ODW), released in 1982 by EMI Records. The album was recorded at Intergalactic Studio, except for "Moving Windows" which was recorded at Electric Lady Studios, both studios were located in New York.

== Critical reception ==
Professional ratings
Review scores
Source	Rating
AllMusic	3/5 stars

In a retrospective review for AllMusic, critic Stephen Schnee wrote of the album, "Relying exclusively on synths, Silva and bandmates Layne Rico and Scott Simon create an intriguing aural landscape. There is not a synthetic beat out of place here, and it is a most enjoyable release. Too bad we didn't get to hear more of them."

== Track listing ==
All songs written by ODW, except ‡ ODW and David Spradley

Side one

1. "Auto Music"‡ – 3:01
2. "She Was Someone" – 3:03
3. "Elevate Her"‡ – 3:29
4. "Track Me Down" – 3:15
5. "Daddy's Slave" – 3:59
6. "Longitude 60°" – 3:19

Side two

7. "Love Machine"‡ – 3:44* (*time printed on album, actual time 4:33)
8. "Always Be True" – 2:44
9. "Moving Windows" – 3:55
10. "Paris" – 3:14
11. "Buildings"‡ – 4:20

== Personnel ==
Credits are adapted from the Moving Windows liner notes.

- Layne Rico — synthesizer
- Keith Silva — vocals; keyboards
- Scott Simon — bass synthesizer; saxophone
- David Spradley and ODW — production
  - Frank Simon and ODW — production on "She Was Someone"
- Claire Taylor — album design
- Anders Nordström — photography

== Special thanks ==
Bob Currie, Aurthur Ring, Nona Hendryx, J.K., Fred Zarr, Ted Currier, M.O.T.C., Lo Chin
