= Paul Keenan (songwriter) =

- Born: Paul John Keenan; 5 November 1980 (age 45)
- Origin: Dumbarton, Scotland
- Genres: Electronic (Funky-House, Nu-Disco, Synthwave)
- Occupations: record producer; songwriter; remixer; record label owner
- Instrument: Synthesizer
- Years active: 2004 – present
- Label: Synth Pimpz

Paul Keenan is a songwriter and producer based in Dumbarton, near Glasgow in Scotland. He is best known for co-founding the successful UK dance act Uniting Nations along with its other co-founding member Daz Sampson, Together they had four hit singles, "Out of Touch", "You and Me", "Ai No Corrida" and "Do It Yourself".

In addition co-founder, producer and songwriter of 2020 established synthwave project FHE. As FHE he has released popular singles such as the Haddaway collaboration 'Part Of You', 'Crucifix Of Light', which contains a chorus sample from the 1987 released 'Cry Little Sister (Theme from The Lost Boys)'. Furthermore original singles such as 'Mirror' and 'Beg For More'.

== Discography ==
=== Albums ===
as part of Uniting Nations

- 2005 One World

=== Singles ===
as part of Uniting Nations

Year	Title	Chart Positions	Album
Year	Title	UK	Album
2004	"Out of Touch"	7	One World
2005	"You and Me"	15	One World
2005	"Ai No Corrida" (feat. Laura More)	18	One World
2006	"Music in Me" — (Radio Single)	—	One World
2007	"Do It Yourself (Go Out and Get It)"	64	
2008	"Pressure Us" (feat. Lucia Horn)	—	
