= Our Daughter's Wedding =

American synthpop trio

Our Daughters Wedding
- Origin: New York
- Genres: Synthpop, new wave
- Years active: 1979–1984
- Labels: EMI America Records
- Past members: Layne Rico; Keith Silva; Scott Simon

Our Daughters Wedding was an American synthpop trio, consisting of Layne Rico on Synare synthesizer, Keith Silva on vocals and keyboards, and Scott Simon on bass-synth and saxophone. Though the group was based in New York, Silva and Rico were from California. The group took their name from a type of DIY photo album.

== Career ==
Silva and Rico played in a group, Human Bends, in their hometown of Fairfield in the Bay Area of California. They moved to New York, where Our Daughters Wedding debuted in 1979 with Silva, Rico and 'a woman named Vanessa'. Simon replaced Vanessa soon afterwards. Of the group's name, Silva later said "It's so simple it's disgusting... You buy a little photo album at Woolworth’s and you get a stencil with it to write something on the cover like 'Baby’s first Year.' Or 'Our Daughter’s Wedding.'"

In 1981, the group's "Lawnchairs", an independently funded and released single, reached #31 on the Billboard Disco Chart and #49 on the UK Singles Chart in August 1981. They toured with other bands of the day including U2, Duran Duran, Orchestral Manoeuvres in the Dark, Iggy Pop, The Psychedelic Furs and frequently appeared on MTV as guest hosts. Their television resume also included various shows on both BBC & ITV. They appeared in Episode One of the ITV drama 'Jangles' (Opportunity) which starred Hazel O'Connor and Jesse Birdsall.

They released the Digital Cowboy EP on EMI America in 1981, produced by Colin Thurston. The EP was recorded at Chipping Norton Recording Studios in England (with notes "no sequencers used"), and it featured "Target for Life" which had a similar sound to early Talk Talk hits that came a year later. In addition to "Lawnchairs" the other tracks are "Red Alert", "Dance Floor" and "No One's Watching." Although the band did have a song titled "Digital Cowboy", it was not recorded for the EP. Simon later teamed with the band Hyperbubble to finally record the song for Hyperbubble's 2017 album Western Ware.

After Digital Cowboy, the band released an album in 1982 - Moving Windows. The record was co-produced by David Spradly (writer of "Atomic Dog" and a member of P-Funk) who gave the music a prescient hip hop sound. Locked in a recording contract and with no record or tour support, the band remained on the road for one year touring the USA with The Psychedelic Furs. The band broke up in 1984, but regrouped in 2012 with a new record label (Dreamfield Records) and a new release, "Life's A Party."

Following Our Daughters Wedding, Rico was a member of Gogoplex, which released one single in 1986.

Equipment used in live shows as a trio included Roland Corporation RS-09, MicroMoog, Prophet-5, Sequential Circuits Pro-1, Synare 2 percussion synthesizer, Electro-Harmonix DRM-32 drum machine.

== Discography ==
=== Albums ===
- Digital Cowboy (EP) (1981), EMI
- Moving Windows (1982), EMI
- Nightlife: The Collection (2007, compilation album), Almacantar Records
- Life's A Party (EP) (2012) Dreamfield Records

=== Singles ===
- "Lawnchairs" (1980), Design Records
- "Nightlife" b/w "Raincoats & Silverware" (1980), Design Records
- "Digital Cowboy" (1981), EMI
- "Auto Music" (1982), EMI
- "Elevate Her" b/w "Buildings" (1982), EMI
- "Take Me" (1984), EMI
