= You and Me (Uniting Nations song) =

2005 single by Uniting Nations

Single by Uniting Nations

from the album One World
- Released: 25 July 2005
- Length: 3:05 (radio edit)
- Label: Gusto
- Songwriters: Daz Sampson; Paul Keenan
- Producers: Daz Sampson; Paul Keenan

Uniting Nations singles chronology
"Out of Touch" (2004)	"You and Me" (2005)	"Ai No Corrida" (2005)

Audio
- "You and Me" on YouTube

"You and Me" is a song by British dance music act Uniting Nations from their 2005 debut album, One World. The song was fronted by new band member Craig Powell and includes vocals from studio session artist Jinian Wilde. Released on 25 July 2005, the single reached number 15 on the UK Singles Chart. The live performance, including appearance on the Top of the Pops, was by Craig Powell.

== Music video ==
The music video was shot in a 9-to-5 office bureau setting, during a heatwave, while the sexy secretaries are drooling over a new "office boy" recruit (Powell) trying to seduce him.

== Track listings ==
UK CD single

1. "You and Me" (radio edit)
2. "You and Me" (extended original mix)
3. "You and Me" (Bimbo Jones club mix)
4. "You and Me" (Aston Martinez & Mario Held remix)
5. "You and Me" (Paul Roberts remix)
6. "You and Me" (Dizzy Deejays vrs The Little Rascals remix)
7. "You and Me" (video)

UK 12-inch single

A1. "You and Me" (Bimbo Jones dub)
B1. "You and Me" (Aston Martinez & Mario Held remix)
B2. "You and Me" (radio edit)

Australian CD single

1. "You and Me" (radio edit)
2. "You and Me" (extended original mix)
3. "You and Me" (Cloud 99 remix)
4. "You and Me" (Aston Martinez & Mario Held remix)
5. "You and Me" (Bimbo Jones club mix)
6. "You and Me" (Overklash remix)

== Charts ==
=== Weekly charts ===
Chart (2005)	Peak position
Australia (ARIA)	59
Finland (Suomen virallinen lista)	14
Ireland (IRMA)	26
Scotland Singles (OCC)	9
UK Singles (OCC)	15
UK Indie (OCC)	1

=== Year-end charts ===
Chart (2005)	Position
UK Singles (OCC)	198

== Release history ==
Region	Date	Format(s)	Label(s)	Ref.
United Kingdom	25 July 2005	CD	Gusto	
Australia	5 September 2005	CD	Festival Mushroom	
