= Eastwood (album) =

Studio album by Cuban Boys
- Released: 2000
- Genre: Synthpop
- Label: EMI / Liberty

Cuban Boys chronology
Eastwood (2000)	The Satellite Junkyard (2008)

Singles from Eastwood
- 1. "Cognoscenti vs. Intelligentsia" Released: 1999; 2. "Inertia Kicks" Released: 2000

Eastwood is the Cuban Boys' first and only major label album. It was released in 2000, after some delay, following the band's only UK hit single, "Cognoscenti vs. Intelligentsia".

The album is named after Stephen Eastwood, music review editor at Teletext who had given the band early coverage and features sleeve-notes by John Peel.

== Critical reception ==
Professional ratings
Review scores
Source	Rating
NME	(very unfavourable)

Eastwood received a very poor review in the NME—who labelled the album "a 19-track procession of pretend disco and A-level Aqua novelty wank"—and sold poorly.

== Track listing ==
1. "<boot>"
2. "Kenny"
3. "I Like Everybody"
4. "Inertia Kicks"
5. "Patsy Prozac"
6. "Automation and On"
7. "Cognoscenti vs. Intelligentsia"
8. "Skinhead Cowgirls"
9. "Czar Zoo"
10. "The Heel"
11. "My Clone"
12. "Self Esteem" (cover of the Offspring song)
13. "Hooked On Cuban Boys"
14. "Stardust Part 3 (Ariana in Space)"
15. "Finale"

The Secret Discotheque for the Subterraneans bonus tracks

1. "Inertia Kicks (Fuchisarama Mix)"
2. "How to Survive in the Atomic Age"
3. "My Clone (Pink)"
4. "Inertia Kicks (Donkeyslap Mix)"

== Singles and chart positions ==
Cognoscenti vs. Intelligentsia reached number 4 on the UK Singles chart on 25 December 1999. It was also number 1 in John Peel's Festive Fifty in 1999. "Kenny" had previously been released in a different version called "Oh My God They Killed Kenny" and failed to chart, although it reached number 6 in the 1998 Festive Fifty. Following the band's split from EMI, "Inertia Kicks" was released as a self-published limited edition single in a five track format ineligible for inclusion in the UK Singles Chart.

== Release history ==
Region	Date	Label	Format	Catalog
United Kingdom	2000	EMI	CD	528 4702
