= One Hundred Ways =

Single by Quincy Jones featuring James Ingram

from the album The Dude
- B-side: "Velas"
- Released: December 1981
- Recorded: 1981
- Genre: R&B; soul jazz; quiet storm
- Length: 4:19
- Label: A&M
- Songwriters: Kathy Wakefield; Benjamin Wright; Tony Coleman
- Producer: Quincy Jones

Quincy Jones singles chronology
"Razzamatazz" (1981)	"One Hundred Ways" (1981)	"Betcha Wouldn't Hurt Me" (1981)

James Ingram singles chronology
"Just Once" (1981)	"One Hundred Ways" (1981)	"Baby, Come to Me" (1982)

"One Hundred Ways" is a 1981 single released from Quincy Jones's album The Dude on A&M Records. The song features James Ingram on vocals. The song reached number 14 on the U.S. Billboard Hot 100 in 1982. It was a bigger Adult Contemporary hit, reaching number five in the U.S. and number six in Canada. Ingram received the 1982 Grammy Award for Best Male R&B Vocal Performance for the song.

== Personnel ==
- James Ingram – lead vocal
- Steve Lukather – guitar
- Greg Phillinganes – electric piano, synthesizer solo
- Ian Underwood – synthesizer, synthesizer programming
- Louis Johnson – bass guitar
- John Robinson – drums
- Jerry Hey – horn arrangement, trumpet
- Chuck Findley – trumpet
- Bill Reichenbach Jr. – trombone
- Kim Hutchcroft – saxophone, flute
- Ernie Watts – saxophone, flute, tenor saxophone solo fills
- Johnny Mandel – string arrangement, synthesizer arrangement
- Gerald Vinci – concertmaster
- Quincy Jones – vocal arrangement, rhythm arrangement

== Chart performance ==
=== Weekly charts ===
Chart (1981–82)	Peak position
Canada RPM 100 Top Singles	43
Canada RPM Adult Contemporary	6
US Billboard Hot 100	14
US Billboard Hot Soul Singles	10
US Billboard Adult Contemporary	5

=== Year-end charts ===
Chart (1982)	Rank
U.S. Billboard Hot 100	61

== Samples ==
- The song was sampled in rapper MF Doom's popular song "Rhymes Like Dimes" (and its instrumental re-release, "Monosodium Glutamate") on 1999's Operation: Doomsday and 2001's Special Herbs, Vol. 1 respectively.
