= Bang Bang Machine =

- Origin: Evesham, Worcestershire, England
- Genres: Alternative rock, Indie rock
- Years active: 1989–1996
- Label: Ultimate Recording Company
- Past members: Steve Eagles; Elizabeth Freeth; Stan Lee; Lamp

Bang Bang Machine were an indie band from Evesham, Worcestershire in England. They formed in 1989 and split up in 1996 after record company troubles. After 17 years they re-released their back catalogue on iTunes in 2013.

In January 1992 the band recorded a Peel Session for broadcast on BBC Radio 1. Their track "Geek Love" topped John Peel's Festive 50 in 1992, with Peel stating "even if they never made another record, they’ll have achieved more than most of us do in our entire lives".

Following the success of their "Geek Love" debut, the band were "steamrollered" by major labels, until in 1994 they released their debut album, Eternal Happiness, on Ultimate. A review within the CMJ New Music Report described the album as "lush, defiant, giddy, sometimes ethereal, sometimes bubblegum-gooey, sometimes pop-snappy". Album track "16 Years", called a "turbulent 1992 indie classic" by The Guardian critic Dave Simpson, was about the Stefan Kiszko case where an innocent man was jailed for a crime he did not commit.

== Band personnel ==
- Steve Eagles: Guitar
- Elizabeth Freeth: Vocals
- Stan Lee: Bass
- Lamp: Drums

== Discography ==
=== Albums ===
- (1994) Eternal Happiness
- (1995) Amphibian

=== Singles ===
- "The Geek" EP (500 promo copies)
- "Geek Love" EP
- "Evil Circus" EP
- "Technologica" EP
- "Geek Love Remixes" EP
- "Give You Anything"
- "Godstar" (Given away free at gigs)
- "Breathless" (#96 UK singles chart, #10 UK Ind)
- "Love It Bleeds"
- "Show Me Your Pain"

=== Music Videos ===
- "Aim for the heart Ramon".
- "Geek Love" Directed by Andy Lee.
- "Lovely Lily" Directed by Rob Crabtree.
- "Technologica" Directed by Rob Crabtree.
- "Give you anything" Directed by Kinofist Productions.
- "Breathless" Directed by Mark Nunnely.
- "Show Me Your Pain".
