= Just Once =

- Side A of the US single

Single by Quincy Jones featuring James Ingram

from the album The Dude
- B-side: "The Dude"
- Released: September 1981
- Genre: R&B
- Length: 4:32
- Label: A&M
- Songwriters: Barry Mann, Cynthia Weil
- Producer: Quincy Jones

Quincy Jones singles chronology
"Ai No Corrida" (1981)	"Just Once" (1981)	"Razzamatazz" (1981)

James Ingram singles chronology
"Just Once" (1981)	"One Hundred Ways" (1981)

"Just Once" is a 1981 single released from Quincy Jones' album The Dude on A&M Records. The song features James Ingram on vocals, and reached number 17 on the Billboard chart in the summer of 1981. Ingram was nominated for Best Male Pop Vocal Performance at the 1982 Grammy Awards.

== History and composition ==
On a television program interview, Ingram stated that this song was a $50 demo done by ATV Music, composed by Barry Mann and Cynthia Weil. Quincy Jones called back and wanted Ingram to sing on his album.

The song is composed originally in the key of C major. The bridge modulates to the key of A flat major, moves to B major, then to D major for the last chorus and the coda. The song ends with a single unexpected B major 7th chord, which can be seen as musically signallng a fresh sign of hope for the uncertain relationship portrayed in the song's lyrics.

== Personnel ==
- James Ingram – lead vocal
- Steve Lukather – guitar
- Robbie Buchanan – acoustic piano, string synthesizer
- David Foster – acoustic and electric piano
- Greg Phillinganes – synthesizer
- Ian Underwood – synthesizer, synthesizer programming
- Abraham Laboriel – bass guitar
- John Robinson – drums
- Paulinho da Costa – percussion
- Patti Austin – background vocals
- Jerry Hey – horn arrangement, trumpet
- Chuck Findley – trumpet
- Bill Reichenbach Jr. – trombone
- Kim Hutchcroft – saxophone, flute
- Ernie Watts – saxophone, flute
- Johnny Mandel – string arrangement, synthesizer arrangement
- Gerald Vinci – concertmaster
- Quincy Jones – vocal arrangement, rhythm arrangement

== Charts ==
Chart (1982)	Peak position
US Billboard Hot 100	17
US Billboard R&B Singles	11
US Billboard Adult Contemporary	7

== Popular culture ==
- The song was featured prominently over the final scene of the 1982 film The Last American Virgin.
- The song was referenced in Quest for Ratings, the 11th Episode of the 8th Season of South Park when Stan says "We gave it our best" to which teacher Mr. Meryl responds "And I guess your best wasn't good enough".
