= Ben Shaw =

Ben or Benjamin Shaw may refer to:

- Ben Shaw (DJ), British house music producer, remixer and DJ
- Ben Shaw (American football) (1893–?), American football guard
- Ben Shaw (baseball) (1893–1959), Major League Baseball player
- Ben Shaw (Labour activist) (1865–1942), British labour movement activist
- Benjamin Shaw (musician), English musician
- Benjamin Shaw (MP) (c. 1770–1843), English politician, MP for Westbury 1812–18

== See also ==
- Ben Shore, a character in the TV series Free Willy
