= Lolly Pop =

American singer

- Born: Brooke R. Calder; 1975 (age 50–51)
- Genres: Electronic
- Occupations: Vocalist, songwriter, producer
- Instruments: Vocals, synthesizer
- Years active: 2002–present
- Website: Official website

Lolly Pop is a persona of Brooke R. Calder, as produced by Ricardo Autobahn, Monte Moir and Doctor Fink.

== Biography ==
Raised between the United States and Zimbabwe, Africa, Calder relocated to Minneapolis, Minnesota, to work as a dancer for Prince in 1994. Cast in the New Power Generation (NPG)'s "Get Wild" video, she was later awarded a studio apprenticeship with NPG keyboardist Morris Hayes. Upon completion, she served as a label intern with Twin/Tone Records, marketing side projects of Information Society and Semisonic.

Post Twin/Tone, Calder helmed spoken word project Burning Shakespeare and electro-kitsch trio TELEPHONE!. Circa 2004, Calder was re-positioned as a solo artist (Lolly Pop) and produced by Fink, Moir and Autobahn. In 2007, the video for "Elevator Operator" was featured on RockAmerica while the single was used in the Dash Mihok film, Loveless in Los Angeles. That same year, Pop appeared at Winter Music Conference, guested in the Paul Moering short film, Climbing Trees, and worked closely with First Avenue.

Next recruited as the female vocalist for British outfit POP INC, Calder continued to contribute vocals to and/or produce U.S. acts Afraid Of Americans (A*O*A), glean (guesting Rick McCollum of The Afghan Whigs), The Red Hour as well as the U.K.'s Cuban Boys. With The Rembrandts' Phil Solem, Calder co-wrote the theme song for the Launch TV comedy Graham Crackers.

In 2019, she appeared with Jerome Benton in the video for Jellybean Johnson's "Put Some Jelly On It". Calder next co-wrote lyrics for the Johnson-helmed Regal The Rare collaboration "Blue Goo", bookending decades of creating with members of The Minneapolis Sound.

Calder most recently collaborated with BBC award-winning director Martin Gooch on Everybody Loves Dancing, co-founded Manual Control Records and runs Calder Creative (a music consulting firm) in Philadelphia.

== Charitable efforts ==
During 2019, Calder helmed a suitcase and donations initiative for survivors of the Drake fire. Throughout 2017, A*O*A donated their sales profits to the NODAPL Legal Fund and continue to provide a $1 royalty to RAICES for each maxi-single sold. In 2004, Calder partnered with First Avenue to raise money for the Tubman Alliance, and organized a female-fronted festival dubbed Girlfest.

== Discography ==
- 2000: BURNING SHAKESPEARE - No Juliet EP - Self Released Cassette
- 2001: THOUSAND VOID CRUSH f. BURNING SHAKESPEARE - "Radio Free" - Sursumcorda Records
- 2001: BROWN RAINBOW - Underground Soundtracks (Various tracks) - Self Released Cassette
- 2002: TELEPHONE! - Love... EP - Self Released CD
- 2003: TELEPHONE! - *69 EP - Self Released CD
- 2003: CHUCK LOVE - Continuous (Song: "Perfect") - Om Records
- 2004: TC ELECTROPUNK VOLUME 1 (Song: "Life on Hold")
- 2004: DORY/1DJ - 8Bits (song: "Encore") - Self Released CD
- 2005: TC ELECTROPUNK VOLUME 2 (Song: "Elevator Operator")
- 2005: SUNNY SMACK - Mezzanine Girls (Song: "Mezzanine") - Self Released CD
- 2006: THE CUBAN BOYS - Satellite Junkyard (Song: "Claudine Is Blue") - Banoffeesound
- 2006: THE CUBAN BOYS - BBC Radio [live] (Song: "Walking In The Air") - Banoffeesound
- 2007: LOLLY POP - Elevator Operator (Danny Morris remix video) - Rockamerica
- 2007: LOLLY POP - Elevator Operator (Digital maxi single) - Modo Disco (UK)
- 2007: LOLLY POP (Self-titled debut and remixes) - Modo Disco (UK)
- 2008: THE PLASTIC CONSTELLATIONS - We Appreciate You (Songs: "Stay That Way", "So Many Friends") - Longtime Listener
- 2009: POP INC. - "Looking 4 The KLF" (Video - original edit and download card/maxi single) - Modo Disco (UK) / Rockamerica
- 2009: TC ELECTROPUNK VOLUME 5 (Song: POP INC. - "Disenchanted")
- 2010: ANDRA - "Love Is 4 Suckaz" Mixtape (Song: Models & Bottles) - Krucial Noize/Kerry Brothers Jr
- 2010: POP INC. vs. SYMPHONO - "Looking 4 The KLF" (Single) - Ninthwave Records
- 2011: POP INC. - "BLVD (Boulevard of Broken Dreams)" (Video/DVD, digital maxi single)
- 2012: TC ELECTROPUNK VOLUME 6 (Song: POP INC. - "Hollywood Kills")
- 2013: J-MI & MIDI-D - "Timeline" - Dance Dance Revolution
- 2014: glean - Echoes & Waves (EP)
- 2014: GRAHAM CRACKERS THEME SONG - "Steady On (True Blue)" featuring Phil Solem
- 2015: TOUCH GUITARS COMPILATION (Song: glean - "Mother") - Iapetus Berlin
- 2015: glean - Shadows & Sand (EP)
- 2016: A*O*A - "I'm Afraid of Americans" (Digital single)
- 2017: AIDAN CASSERLY - Spoken (Song: "April 21st")
- 2017: THE RUDE AWAKENING - "Pride" - Electro London
- 2017: LOLLY POP - LINGERIE: Lost Remixes & Bonus Tracks - Banoffeesound Records
- 2018: A*O*A - "I'm Afraid of Americans" (Remixes)
- 2019: FRODE HOLM - Third (Engineer, Vocal Producer, Backing Vocals)
- 2021: THE RED HOUR - "Cracks" - Manual Control Records
- 2022: BROOKE R. CALDER - "Everybody Loves Dancing" (Video and Digital Single) - Manual Control Records
- 2023: REGAL THE RARE f. Jellybean Johnson - "Blue Goo"(Songwriter)
- 2025: BURNING SHAKESPEARE - RADIO-FREE EP (Digital Reissue) - Manual Control Records
- 2025 - 2026: BROOKE R. CALDER - CINEMA - Currently in production.
