= Rikki & Daz =

British pop music duo

- Origin: London, England
- Genres: Eurodance
- Years active: 2002–2003
- Members: Daz Sampson; Ricardo Autobahn (John Matthews)

Rikki & Daz was a pop music duo, formed in 2002 by John Matthews and Daz Sampson. John Matthews of the Cuban Boys fame and also known as Ricardo Autobahn, became Rikki in the duo. He teamed up with Sampson, named just Daz in the duo, and went on to release the duo's only single, "Rhinestone Cowboy (Giddy Up Giddy Up)", a take on Glen Campbell's hit "Rhinestone Cowboy". It featured the country singer in a new vocal for the release, and Campbell appeared in the video. The single went on to reach No. 12 in the UK Singles Chart and No. 16 in the Irish Singles Chart. The pair also contributed separately to a cover of their version of the song with the band Hyperbubble on their 2017 album Western Ware.

Another popular release as Rikki & Daz was the 2003 remix remake of DJ Bobo's hit "Chihuahua" credited to "Rikki & Daz Vs. JJ Mason Remix)". JJ Mason had partnered earlier in 2000 with Daz Sampson to form the duo Fraud Squad and had made recordings together including "The Crown" and "The Feeling". JJ Mason also mixed many other hits by Sampson.

Sampson and John Matthews later had a hit as the Barndance Boys – a musical formation made as a country and folk novelty act in 2003.

== Discography ==
=== Singles ===
List of singles, with selected chart positions
Title	Year	Peak chart positions	
Title	Year	UK	AUS
"Rhinestone Cowboy (Giddy Up Giddy Up)" (featuring Glen Campbell)	2002	12	81

Remixes

- 2003: "Chihuahua" (Rikki & Daz vs. JJ Mason Remix)

== See also ==
- Ricardo Autobahn
- Daz Sampson
- Barndance Boys
- Uniting Nations
