= Rhinestone Cowboy =

Single by Glen Campbell

from the album Rhinestone Cowboy
- B-side: "Lovelight"
- Released: May 26, 1975
- Recorded: February 24 – March 19, 1975
- Studio: Sound Labs, Hollywood, California
- Genre: Country; symphonic pop
- Length: 3:15
- Label: Capitol
- Songwriter: Larry Weiss
- Producers: Dennis Lambert, Brian Potter

Glen Campbell singles chronology
"It's a Sin When You Love Somebody" (1975)	"Rhinestone Cowboy" (1975)	"Country Boy (You Got Your Feet in L.A.)" (1975)

Music video
- "Rhinestone Cowboy" on YouTube

"Rhinestone Cowboy" is a song written and recorded by Larry Weiss in 1974, then popularized the next year by American country music singer Glen Campbell, and considered to be Campbell's signature song. When released on May 26, 1975, as the lead single and title track from his album Rhinestone Cowboy, it enjoyed huge popularity with both country and pop audiences.

== Background and writing ==
Weiss wrote and recorded "Rhinestone Cowboy" in 1974, and it appeared on his 20th Century Records album Black and Blue Suite. It did not, however, have much of a commercial impact as a single, although it peaked at number 71 in Australia in August 1974.

In late 1974, Campbell heard the song on the radio and, during a tour of Australia, decided to learn it. Soon after his return to the United States, Campbell went to Al Coury's office at Capitol Records, where he was approached about "a great new song" – "Rhinestone Cowboy".

Several music writers noted that Campbell identified very strongly with the subject matter of "Rhinestone Cowboy" – survival and making it, particularly when the chips are down. As Stephen Thomas Erlewine of AllMusic put it, the song is about a veteran artist "who's aware that he's more than paid his dues during his career ... but is still surviving, and someday, he'll shine just like a rhinestone cowboy."

=== Personnel ===
Credits sourced from Mix:

- Glen Campbell – lead and harmony vocals; 12–string acoustic guitar
- Dean Parks – electric guitar
- Ben Benay – electric guitar
- Fred Tackett – acoustic guitar
- David Paich – piano
- Dennis Lambert – clavinet; piano (low notes at end of chorus)
- Scott Edwards – bass guitar
- Ed Greene – drums
- Gary L. Coleman – tambourine; snare drum; cymbals
- Tom Scott – flute
- Don Menza – flute

== Chart performance ==
Released in May 1975, "Rhinestone Cowboy" immediately caught on with both country and pop audiences. The song spent that summer climbing both the Billboard Hot Country Singles and Billboard Hot 100 charts before peaking at No. 1 by season's end – three nonconsecutive weeks on the country chart, two weeks on the Hot 100. Billboard ranked it as the No. 2 for 1975. It also topped the charts in Canada and several other countries.

During the week of September 13 – the week the song returned to No. 1 on the Billboard country chart, after having been nudged out for a week by "Feelins'" by Conway Twitty and Loretta Lynn – "Rhinestone Cowboy" topped both the country and Hot 100 charts simultaneously. This was the first time a song had accomplished the feat since November 1961, when "Big Bad John" by Jimmy Dean did so.

"Rhinestone Cowboy" was one of six songs released in 1975 that topped both the Billboard Hot 100 and Hot Country Singles charts. The other songs were "Before the Next Teardrop Falls" by Freddy Fender, "(Hey Won't You Play) Another Somebody Done Somebody Wrong Song" by B. J. Thomas, "Thank God I'm a Country Boy" and "I'm Sorry"/"Calypso," both by John Denver, and "Convoy" by C. W. McCall.

The song was also the sole Glen Campbell track in a promotional-only compilation album issued by Capitol records titled The Greatest Music Ever Sold (Capitol SPRO-8511/8512), that was distributed to record stores during the 1976 holiday season as part of Capitol's "Greatest Music Ever Sold" campaign, which promoted 15 "Best Of" albums released by the record label.

After Campbell's death in August 2017, "Rhinestone Cowboy" charted on the Country Digital Song chart at No. 12. As of August 2017, the song had been downloaded more than 368,000 times in the digital era in the United States.

== Charts ==
=== Weekly charts ===
Chart (1975)	Peak position
Australia (Kent Music Report)	5
Belgium (Ultratop 50 Flanders)	4
Belgium (Ultratop 50 Wallonia)	22
Canada Country Singles (RPM)	1
Canada Top Singles (RPM)	1
Canada Adult Contemporary (RPM)	7
Ireland (IRMA)	1
Netherlands (Dutch Top 40)	3
Netherlands (Single Top 100)	3
New Zealand (Recorded Music NZ)	2
South African Singles Chart	2
Sweden (Sverigetopplistan)	17
UK Singles (Official Charts)	4
US Billboard Hot Country Singles	1
US Billboard Hot 100	1
US Billboard Hot Adult Contemporary Tracks	1
West Germany (GfK)	31
Yugoslavian Singles Chart	1

=== Year-end charts ===
Chart (1975)	Rank
Australia (Kent Music Report)	50
Belgian VRT Top 30	43
Canadian RPM Top Singles	4
Netherlands (Dutch Top 40)	81
Netherlands (Single Top 100)	56
UK Singles Chart	21
US Billboard Hot 100	2
US Cashbox Top 100	2

=== All-time charts ===
Chart (1958-2018)	Position
US Billboard Hot 100	157

== Certifications ==
Certifications for "Rhinestone Cowboy"
Region	Certification	Certified units/sales
New Zealand (RMNZ)	Platinum	30,000^{‡}
United Kingdom (BPI)	Gold	400,000^{‡}
United States (RIAA)	Gold	1,000,000^{^}
^{^} Shipments figures based on certification alone.^{‡} Sales+streaming figures based on certification alone.

== Re-recorded version ==
Campbell recorded a new version of the song on his 2013 studio album See You There.

== Awards ==
"Rhinestone Cowboy" was certified gold for sales of 1 million units by the Recording Industry Association of America.

The song became one of Glen Campbell's signature songs and won numerous awards from the Country Music Association, Academy of Country Music, and American Music Awards. It also obtained nominations for a Grammy Award for Best Pop Vocal Performance, Male, as well as for Record of the Year, but did not win.

== Notable cover versions ==
"Rhinestone Cowboy" has been covered by artists including Thom Yorke and Radiohead, Troy Cassar-Daley and Adam Harvey, Soul Asylum, Belle and Sebastian, Lloyd Green, David Hasselhoff, Charley Pride, Chris LeDoux, Loretta Lynn and White Town.

In 1975, Cher performed it live during her The Cher Show.

The American country singer Slim Whitman covered the song in 1976 on his Red River Valley album. Also in 1976, Canadian comedian Nestor Pistor recorded a parody version, "Winestoned Plowboy", which was itself a modest hit on Canada's country music charts in 1977.

Johnny Carson performed a comedic cover version to open the March 4, 1976, broadcast of The Tonight Show Starring Johnny Carson. The episode was released on DVD in 2016 along with other episodes from that particular week, with Carson referencing his preparations for the performance and Doc Severinsen and the NBC Orchestra performing instrumental versions of the song each night. After his performance, Carson announced that songwriter Larry Weiss was in the audience, a fact he claimed to be unaware of when he sang it a few minutes earlier.

South African singer Ray Dylan covered it on his album Goeie Ou Country - Vol. 3.

Canadian country singer George Canyon covered it in 2016 for the #ForeverCountry series.

In 2019, Bruce Springsteen covered the song in his documentary film and live album promoting his studio album Western Stars.

=== Non-English versions ===
Belgian singer Claire recorded the song in 1975 as "Vreemde Vogels" ("Strange Birds") and had a hit with her version in Flanders. It made it to No. 14 on the Ultratop Flanders chart, staying in the chart for 5 weeks. It also made it to No. 2 on the Vlaamse Top 10 chart.

In 1975, with lyrics more in line with the English original lyrics, it was recorded as "Cowgirl dorée" by the French Canadian singer Renée Martel. The French lyrics of Martel's version were written by Robert Charlebois. The song was covered in 1976 in French as "Je m'appelle Michèle", interpreted as an autobiographical piece by French singer Michèle Torr.

Filipino singer comedian Fred Panopio covered it as a parody song version, "Ang Kawawang Cowboy", which was released in 1976.

In 1977 it was released by Peter Belli and Ulvene in Danish under the title "Verdens bedste kone", and in 1977 in Finnish as "Muukalainen oon kai" interpreted by Kari Tapio.

== Rikki & Daz version ==
In 2002, the British duo Rikki & Daz (made up of Daz Sampson and Ricardo Autobahn (real name John Matthews) released a revamped version of the song in a different arrangement, with additional lyrics and music. Titled "Rhinestone Cowboy (Giddy Up Giddy Up)", the single actually features Glen Campbell singing in the refrain. A music video was also released including Campbell.

=== Track listing ===
1. "Rhinestone Cowboy (Giddy Up Giddy Up)" (Radio Edit) – 3:22
2. "Rhinestone Cowboy (Giddy Up Giddy Up)" (Extended Version) – 5:01
3. "Rhinestone Cowboy (Giddy Up Giddy Up)" (Shake Before Use Remix) – 6:00
4. "Rhinestone Cowboy (Giddy Up Giddy Up)" (Spray Remix) – 5:27

Plus

Music video of "Rhinestone Cowboy (Giddy Up Giddy Up)"

=== Charts ===
Chart performance for "Rhinestone Cowboy (Giddy Up, Giddy Up)"
Chart (2002–2003)	Peak position
Australia (ARIA)	81
UK Singles (Official Charts)	12
