= Touch My Fire =

2005 single by Javine

Single by Javine
- Released: 16 May 2005
- Length: 3:09
- Label: Island
- Songwriters: Javine Hylton; John Themis; Jonathan Shalit
- Producer: Johnny Douglas

Javine singles chronology
| "Don't Walk Away" / "You've Got a Friend" (2004) | "Touch My Fire" (2005) |

Music video
- "Touch My Fire" on YouTube

Eurovision Song Contest 2005 entry
- Country: United Kingdom
- Artist: Javine Hylton
- As: Javine
- Language: English
- Composer: John Themis
- Lyricist: Javine Hylton

Finals performance
- Final result: 22nd
- Final points: 18

Entry chronology
- ◄ "Hold Onto Our Love" (2004)
- "Teenage Life" (2006) ►

"Touch My Fire" is the fifth single by English singer Javine (her first for Island Records), serving as the United Kingdom entry for the Eurovision Song Contest 2005. It was the first new material from Javine since her debut album, Surrender, was released in 2004.

The single reached the number 18 on the UK Singles Chart, giving Javine her fifth consecutive top-20 hit. The version on the single is slightly different from the one that appeared on the Eurovision Song Contest 2005 album, with an extra verse and shorter dance break.

== Track listings ==
CD: 1

1. "Touch My Fire" (single version)
2. "Touch My Fire" (K-Gee mix)

CD: 2

1. "Touch My Fire" (single version)
2. "Touch My Fire" (K-Gee mix)
3. "Touch My Fire" (Soulavengerz Get Your Groove On mix)
4. "Touch My Fire" (video)

== Charts ==
| Chart (2005) | Peak position |
|---|---|
| Ireland (IRMA) | 32 |
| Scotland Singles (OCC) | 18 |
| UK Singles (OCC) | 18 |
