= The Dude (Quincy Jones album) =

Studio album by Quincy Jones
- Released: March 26, 1981
- Recorded: 1980
- Studios: Westlake, Los Angeles, California
- Genres: Pop; R&B; jazz
- Length: 41:02
- Label: A&M
- Producer: Quincy Jones

Quincy Jones chronology
Sounds...and Stuff Like That!! (1978)	The Dude (1981)	Back on the Block (1989)

Singles from The Dude
- 1. "Ai No Corrida" Released: March 1981; 2. "Razzamatazz/Betcha' Wouldn't Hurt Me (12" versions)" Released: June 1981; 3. "Just Once" Released: September 1981; 4. "One Hundred Ways" Released: December 1981

Professional ratings
Review scores
Source	Rating
AllMusic	4/5 stars
The New York Times	(favourable)
Pitchfork	8.1/10
The Rolling Stone Album Guide	3.5/5 stars

The Dude is a studio album by the American musician and producer Quincy Jones. It was released on March 26, 1981, by A&M Records. Jones used many studio musicians.

Three singles were released from the album in the US, all of which charted on the US Top 40. "Just Once" and "One Hundred Ways" both feature vocalist James Ingram and reached No. 17 and 14, respectively, on the Billboard Hot 100. The album gained moreover heavy dance airplay for lead single "Ai No Corrida", which reached No. 28 on the Top 40 and 14 in the UK Singles Chart. The album also contains "Razzamatazz" (with vocals by Patti Austin) which reached No. 11 in the United Kingdom, Jones's biggest solo hit in that country.

The Dude was nominated for twelve Grammy Awards (including Album of the Year) and won three at the 24th Grammy Awards: for Best Instrumental Arrangement; Best R&B Performance by a Duo or Group with Vocal; and Best Instrumental Arrangement (Accompanying Vocalists). It also earned Ingram three Grammy nominations for Best New Artist, Best Male Pop Vocal Performance (for "Just Once") and Best Male R&B Vocal Performance (for "One Hundred Ways"), which he won.

== Track listing ==
No.	Title	Writer(s)	Lead vocalist	Length
1.	"Ai No Corrida"	Chaz Jankel, Kenny Young	Dune (aka Charles May)	6:18
2.	"The Dude"	Quincy Jones, Rod Temperton, Patti Austin	James Ingram	5:35
3.	"Just Once"	Barry Mann, Cynthia Weil	James Ingram	4:32
4.	"Betcha' Wouldn't Hurt Me"	Stevie Wonder, Stephanie Andrews	Patti Austin	3:33
5.	"Somethin' Special"	Rod Temperton	Patti Austin	4:03
6.	"Razzamatazz"	Rod Temperton	Patti Austin	4:20
7.	"One Hundred Ways"	Kathy Wakefield, Ben Wright, Tony Coleman	James Ingram	4:19
8.	"Velas"	Ivan Lins, Vítor Martins	n/a	4:05
9.	"Turn On the Action"	Rod Temperton	Patti Austin	4:17
Total length:				41:02

== Personnel ==
Personnel adapted from album's liner notes.

- Quincy Jones – producer, backing vocals (2), vocal arrangements (1–4, 7), rhythm arrangements (1, 3, 4, 7, 8), synthesizer arrangements (1, 4, 6)
- Patti Austin – lead vocals (4–6, 9), backing vocals (1–6, 9), vocal arrangements (1)
- Tom Bahler – backing vocals (1, 5)
- Michael Boddicker – synthesizer and vocoder (2)
- Robbie Buchanan – acoustic piano and string synthesizer (3)
- Mike Butcher – engineer for Toots Thielemans (8)
- Lenny Castro – handclaps (2, 9)
- Ed "Big Julie" Cherney – assistant engineer
- Kasey Cisyk – backing vocals (6, 9)
- Paulinho da Costa – percussion (1–6, 8, 9), mouth percussion (1)
- Chuck Findley – trumpet (1, 3, 5–7, 9)
- David Foster – acoustic and electric piano (3)
- Jim Gilstrap – backing vocals (1, 2, 5)
- Bernie Grundman – mastering
- Herbie Hancock – electric piano (1, 5, 6, 9)
- Jerry Hey – trumpet (1–3, 5–7, 9), horn arrangements (1–3, 5–7, 9), string arrangements (6, 9), synthesizer arrangements (1, 4, 6, 9)
- Craig Huxley – beam-microtonal tubulons (1)
- Kim Hutchcroft – saxophone (1–3, 5–7), flute (2, 3, 5–7)
- James Ingram – lead vocals (2, 3, 7), backing vocals (2)
- Michael Jackson – backing vocals (2)
- Louis Johnson – bass (1, 2, 4, 5, 7, 8), handclaps (1, 2, 4, 9)
- Abraham Laboriel – bass (3, 9)
- Yvonne Lewis – backing vocals (6, 9)
- Steve Lukather – guitar (1–7, 9), guitar solo (1, 6)
- Johnny Mandel – string and synthesizer arrangements (3, 7, 8)
- Charles May (Dune) – lead vocals (1)
- Greg Phillinganes – synthesizer (1, 3–6, 8, 9), electric piano (2–4, 7–9), handclaps (1, 4), synthesizer solo (7)
- Bill Reichenbach Jr. – trombone (1, 3, 5–7, 9)
- John Robinson – drums, handclaps (1, 2, 4, 9)
- Bruce Swedien – engineering and mixing
- Rod Temperton – vocal and rhythm arrangements (2, 5, 6, 9), synthesizer arrangements (5, 6, 9)
- Jean "Toots" Thielemans – guitar, harmonica and whistle (8)
- Ian Underwood – synthesizer (1, 3, 5–9), synthesizer programming (1, 3–9)
- Gerald Vinci – concertmaster (3, 6–9)
- LaLomie Washburn – backing vocals (2)
- Ernie Watts – saxophone (1–3, 5–7), flute (2, 3, 5–7), tenor saxophone solo (1, 2, 9), alto saxophone solo (5), tenor saxophone solo fills (7)
- Larry Williams – saxophone and flute (2)
- David J. "Hawk" Wolinski – Clavinet (1, 9), mini-Moog synthesizer (5), Yamaha CS-80 synthesizer bass (6), synthesizer programming (5, 9)
- Stevie Wonder – Yamaha CS-80 synthesizer (4), rhythm arrangements (4), Yamaha CS-80 synthesizer solo (2, 4), Yamaha CS-80 synthesizer solo fills (4)
- Syreeta Wright – backing vocals (2)

== Charting history ==
=== Album ===
Weekly chart performance for The Dude
Chart (1982)	Peak position
Australian Albums (Kent Music Report)	63
Canada Top Albums/CDs (RPM)	40
German Albums (Offizielle Top 100)	54
Norwegian Albums (VG-lista)	8
Swedish Albums (Sverigetopplistan)	12
UK Albums (Official Charts)	19
US Billboard 200	9
US Top R&B/Hip-Hop Albums (Billboard)	1
US Top Jazz Albums (Billboard)	1

Year-end chart performance for The Dude
Chart (1982)	Position
US Billboard 200	25
US R&B Albums	9
US Jazz Albums	6

=== Charting singles ===
Chart performance for singles from The Dude
Title	Chart positions						
Title	US	US R&B	US Dance	US AC	AUS	GER	UK
"Ai No Corrida"	28	10	5	—	74	28	14
"Just Once" (with James Ingram)	17	11	—	7	—	—	—
"Razzamatazz" (with Patti Austin)	—	17	—	—	—	—	11
"One Hundred Ways" (with James Ingram)	14	10	—	5	—	—	—
"Betcha Wouldn't Hurt Me"	—	—	—	—	—	—	52

== Certifications and sales ==
Certifications and sales for The Dude
Region	Certification	Certified units/sales
Japan	—	329,010
United States (RIAA)	Platinum	1,000,000^{^}
^{^} Shipments figures based on certification alone.

== Notes ==
- The figure of "The Dude" featured in the album cover was created by Zambian sculptor Fanizani Akuda.
- "Just Once" was featured in the 1982 film The Last American Virgin.
- "One Hundred Ways" was sampled by MF Doom for the track "Rhymes Like Dimes", from his debut solo album, Operation: Doomsday.
- "Velas" was sampled by Jodeci on their 1996 single "Get On Up", as well as by producers Shut Up and Dance for the track "Waking Up", which appeared on Nicolette's first album, Now Is Early. The track was also featured as background music on The Weather Channel.
