= Out of Touch =

1984 single by Daryl Hall & John Oates

Single by Daryl Hall & John Oates

from the album Big Bam Boom
- B-side: "Cold Dark and Yesterday"
- Released: October 4, 1984
- Studio: Electric Lady (New York City)
- Genre: Dance-rock; synth-pop; new wave
- Length: 4:21 (album version); 3:55 (single version); 4:33 (video version)
- Label: RCA Victor
- Songwriters: Daryl Hall; John Oates
- Producers: Daryl Hall & John Oates; Bob Clearmountain

Daryl Hall & John Oates singles chronology
"Adult Education" (1984)	"Out of Touch" (1984)	"Method of Modern Love" (1984)

Audio sample
- "Out of Touch": file; help

Music video
- "Out of Touch" on YouTube

"Out of Touch" is a song by American duo Daryl Hall & John Oates from their twelfth studio album Big Bam Boom (1984). The song was released as the lead single from Big Bam Boom on October 4, 1984, by RCA Records. This song was their sixth and final Billboard Hot 100 number-one single, topping the chart for two weeks in December 1984. It also became the duo's fourteenth consecutive top 40 hit since 1980.

The song often segued from "Dance on Your Knees", the opening song of Big Bam Boom. The accompanying music video for "Out of Touch", featuring a gigantic drum kit, also contains the "Dance on Your Knees" intro, which segues into an edit of the 12-inch remix version.

According to John Oates, he came up with the chorus while randomly playing around with a synthesizer that he did not know how to use. He thought it could be a song for the Stylistics, having a Philly sound. But in the studio the next day a co-producer told him it should be a hit for Hall & Oates themselves. Oates and Hall then co-wrote the verse.

== Music video ==
A video was made for the song, including scenes with Hall and Oates inside a gigantic drum set, which Oates bangs an equally gigantic bass drum pedal into, and from which both escape at the end of the video. The video also features the words "Big Bam Boom" in gigantic letters, with Hall and Oates dancing inside the two O's.

The video was directed by Jeff Stein.

== Track listing and formats ==
US 7-inch vinyl single

1. "Out of Touch" – 3:55
2. "Cold, Dark and Yesterday" – 4:35

US 12-inch vinyl single

1. "Out of Touch" (Club Version) – 7:36
2. "Out of Touch" (Dub Version) – 7:24
3. "Cold, Dark and Yesterday" – 4:35

UK 12-inch vinyl single

1. "Out of Touch" (Video Mix)
2. "Dance on Your Knees" (Extended Mix)
3. "Everytime You Go Away" (Remix Version)

== Personnel ==
- Daryl Hall – lead vocals and backing vocals, rhythm guitar
- John Oates – synthesizers and backing vocals
- G. E. Smith – lead guitar and backing vocals
- Tom Wolk – bass and backing vocals
- Wells Christy – synthesizer
- Clive Smith – sampler
- Jimmy Bralower – drum machine

== Charts ==
=== Weekly charts ===
Chart (1984–1985)	Peak position
Australia (Kent Music Report)	11
Belgium (Ultratop 50 Flanders)	18
Canada (The Record's Retail Singles)	4
Canada Top Singles (RPM)	5
Europe (European Hot 100 Singles)	45
Guatemala (UPI)	6
Netherlands (Dutch Top 40)	33
Netherlands (Single Top 100)	33
New Zealand (Recorded Music NZ)	27
Sweden (Sverigetopplistan)	20
UK Singles (Official Charts)	48
US Billboard Hot 100	1
US Adult Contemporary (Billboard)	8
US Dance Club Songs (Billboard)	1
US Hot R&B/Hip-Hop Songs (Billboard)	24
US Mainstream Rock (Billboard)	18
US Cash Box Top 100	3
West Germany (GfK)	15

=== Year-end charts ===
Chart (1984)	Position
Canada Top Singles (RPM)	47
US Cash Box Top 100	43

Chart (1985)	Position
US Billboard Hot 100	6

== Certifications ==
Region	Certification	Certified units/sales
Canada (Music Canada)	Gold	50,000^{^}
New Zealand (RMNZ)	Platinum	30,000^{‡}
United Kingdom (BPI)	Gold	400,000^{‡}
^{^} Shipments figures based on certification alone.^{‡} Sales+streaming figures based on certification alone.

== Uniting Nations version ==
"Out of Touch"

Single by Uniting Nations

from the album One World
- Released: November 15, 2004
- Length: 2:47
- Label: Gusto
- Songwriters: Daryl Hall; John Oates
- Producers: Paul Keenan; Darren "Daz" Sampson

Uniting Nations singles chronology
"Out of Touch" (2004)	"You and Me" (2005)

Music video
- "Out of Touch" on YouTube

English dance music act Uniting Nations covered "Out of Touch" and released it as their debut single on November 15, 2004. This version peaked at number seven on the UK Singles Chart in January 2005 and remained in the top 75 for 21 weeks. Elsewhere, the cover reached number one in Romania—where it was the most successful single of 2005—and became a top-10 hit in Finland, Ireland, the Netherlands, and Norway. The vocals on the recording were performed by vocalist and session artist Jinian Wilde.

=== Music video ===
The music video for the song features actors Paul Spicer, Charleene Rena, Hayley-Marie Coppin, Sophie Lovell Anderson, Daniela Martins, a participant of French Big Brother Secret Story, and one unidentified woman playing strip poker. The women realise Spicer is cheating by wearing an in-ear monitor which leads to a CCTV room with cameras watching the girls and their cards. The video continues with the women getting their own back, and Spicer losing his trousers during the poker game. The video ends with Spicer running out the room with his hair ruffled in his briefs, looking embarrassed, while the girls pop champagne corks and continue partying.

=== Track listings ===
UK CD single

1. "Out of Touch" (radio mix) – 2:46
2. "Out of Touch" (extended mix) – 6:16
3. "Out of Touch" (Skylab remix) – 7:03
4. "Out of Touch" (Tyrrell remix) – 6:50
5. "Out of Touch" (The Vanden Plas remix) – 7:20
6. "Out of Touch" (Paul Roberts remix) – 6:55
7. "Out of Touch" (video)

UK 12-inch single

A1. "Out of Touch" (extended mix) – 6:16
A2. "Out of Touch" (Hardfaze remix) – 7:55
B1. "Out of Touch" (Skylab remix) – 7:03
B2. "Out of Touch" (Tyrell remix) – 6:50

Australian and New Zealand CD single

1. "Out of Touch" (Love You So Much radio mix) – 3:31
2. "Out of Touch" (extended mix) – 6:16
3. "Out of Touch" (radio edit with Vox filter intro) – 2:46
4. "Out of Touch" (Skylab remix) – 7:03
5. "Out of Touch" (Outsiderz remix) – 7:05
6. "Out of Touch" (Paul Roberts remix) – 6:55

=== Charts ===
==== Weekly charts ====
Chart (2004–2005)	Peak position
Australia (ARIA)	41
Austria (Ö3 Austria Top 40)	68
Belgium (Ultratop 50 Flanders)	23
Czech Republic (IFPI)	20
Finland (Suomen virallinen lista)	9
Germany (GfK)	27
Hungary (Dance Top 40)	16
Hungary (Rádiós Top 40)	38
Ireland (IRMA)	5
Ireland Dance (IRMA)	1
Netherlands (Dutch Top 40)	9
Netherlands (Single Top 100)	32
Norway (VG-lista)	8
Romania (Romanian Top 100)	1
Scottish Singles Sales (Official Charts)	8
Sweden (Sverigetopplistan)	26
Switzerland (Schweizer Hitparade)	74
UK Singles (Official Charts)	7
UK Dance (Official Charts)	13
UK Indie (Official Charts)	1

Chart (2024)	Peak position
Poland (Polish Airplay Top 100)	75

==== Year-end charts ====
Chart (2004)	Position
UK Singles (OCC)	126

Chart (2005)	Position
CIS Airplay (TopHit)	146
Europe (Eurochart Hot 100)	87
Netherlands (Dutch Top 40)	26
Romania (Romanian Top 100)	1
Russia Airplay (TopHit)	134
UK Singles (OCC)	74

=== Certifications ===
Region	Certification	Certified units/sales
United Kingdom (BPI)	Silver	200,000^{‡}
^{‡} Sales+streaming figures based on certification alone.

=== Release history ===
Region	Date	Format(s)	Label(s)	Ref.
Australia	November 15, 2004	CD	Festival Mushroom	
United Kingdom	November 22, 2004	CD	Gusto	

== See also ==
- Hall & Oates discography
- List of Romanian Top 100 number ones of the 2000s
- List of Billboard Hot 100 singles of 1984
- List of number-one dance singles of 1984 (U.S.)
