= Ben Shaw (DJ) =

British house music producer, remixer and DJ

Ben Shaw is a British house music producer, remixer and DJ, who has released records under his own name, as well as the monikers Sunscape and Gradient.

== Biography ==
His biggest hit single as an artist came in 2001 when "So Strong," a track featuring Adele Holness on vocals, topped the US Billboard Hot Dance Music/Club Play chart. It peaked at #72 in the UK Singles Chart in July 2001.
