= Tall Pony =

British pop band

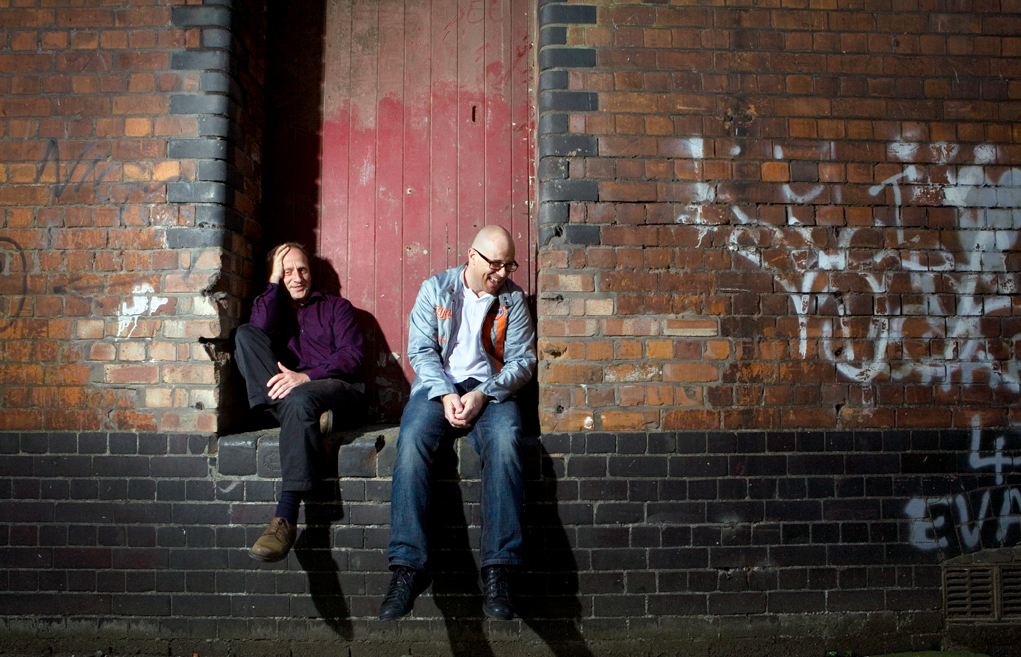

Background information
- Origin: Cheltenham and Gloucester
- Genre: Pop music
- Years active: 2006–2007
- Past members: Paul Towey, Tony Gage
- Website: Tall Pony's MySpace page

Tall Pony was a band consisting of Paul Towey and Tony Gage from Cheltenham and Gloucester.

Their song "I'm Your Boyfriend Now" was played first by BBC Radio 1's Huw Stephens at the end of October 2006. The track became the year's most requested song on his show —and subsequently was voted number 1 in the inaugural Dandelion Radio Festive Fifty for 2006. In August 2007 the band split up.
