= Cognoscenti vs. Intelligentsia =

1999 single by Cuban Boys

Single by the Cuban Boys

from the album Eastwood
- B-side: "Fluorescent Dream Beams"; "Datacrime"
- Released: 13 December 1999
- Genre: Dance-pop
- Length: 3:17
- Label: EMI
- Songwriters: Roger Miller; The Cuban Boys
- Producer: The Cuban Boys

The Cuban Boys singles chronology
"Oh My God! They Killed Kenny!" (1998)	"Cognoscenti vs. Intelligentsia" (1999)	"Inertia Kicks" (2000)

Music video
- "Cognoscenti vs Intelligentsia" on YouTube

"Cognoscenti vs. Intelligentsia" (meaning "the experts versus the intellectual elite"), also known as "C vs. I", is a song by English electronic music group the Cuban Boys. The song consists almost in its entirety of an unofficial soundalike sampled loop from "Whistle Stop" by Roger Miller which was featured in the Disney movie Robin Hood, played at high speed in a manner similar to the classic "Chipmunks" records. The original sample, also sped up, was first featured on the Internet as part of "The Hampster Dance" song on the website of the same name.

== Background ==
The song was first aired on John Peel's BBC Radio 1 show on 7 April 1999, and quickly became one of the most requested songs on his show. After being included on a free sampler CD on the industry magazine The Tip Sheet, the song caught the attention of numerous large record labels including EMI, Parlophone and RCA, thanks mostly to the efforts of Jonathan King. The band eventually signed for EMI. They were given £25,000 to record a video for the song which ended up featuring a giant fibreglass melon covered in trifle and a live-action hamster singing along.

The song's closing lines are of an announcer of a children's radio show:

And this is your Uncle Dan saying good night.
Good night, little kids, good night.
We're off? Good, well that oughta hold the little bastards.

This last line, usually omitted on radio play, is itself a sample from Kermit Schafer's 1950s "recreation" of a supposed on-air blooper by 1920s children's radio presenter, "Uncle Don". In fact, this faux pas is an urban legend. The sample caused many complaints to the band's label EMI, enough for a Parental Advisory sticker to be included on the single by the end of the single's first week of release, presumably by those assuming the song to be aimed at children. Additionally, the sample was left unedited when the song was played by Jo Whiley on BBC Radio 1 in November, the broadcast of the song which eventually greenlit the single's release by EMI, the sample was again unedited, causing much controversy.

The song itself is, like many recordings by the band, dotted with other humorous quotes from old movies, TV and radio programmes, including the 1965 Michael Winner movie You Must Be Joking!, and at least one from the 1950s dramatization of Jules Verne's Journey to the Center of the Earth: "Don't be too happy. After some of months of this you'll be smacking your lips at the thought of salt beef". The "B-side" tracks on the single exhibit similar traits, with e.g. Fluorescent Dream Beams featuring several samples from 1974's Phantom of the Paradise, alongside an original vocal. Somewhat ironically, whilst the movie quotes are original, the core sample had to be re-recorded as a close but imperfect soundalike owing to copyright clearance issues - a problem that also plagued several other Cuban Boys singles and many tracks on the Eastwood album (e.g. Kenny, I Like Everybody), though it is unclear whether the holders refused permission (heavily suggested in the case of Inertia Kicks) or EMI simply declined to pay the licensing fees. It is known that in the case of later single "The Hampsterdance Song", which was recorded by the group The Boomtang Boys under the name Hampton the Hampster, Disney did not want the sample to be used. That single also ultimately used a soundalike.

== Release ==
Unlike the later single "The Hampsterdance Song", "Cognoscenti vs. Intelligentsia" was released without the involvement of the owner of the original website, Deidre LaCarte. LaCarte accused the Cuban Boys of stealing in an article in the Mail on Sunday Originally scheduled for release as a single in November 1999, the release date was threatened to be pushed back to some time in January 2000 until the song was played on Jo Whiley's afternoon radio show. It received the same amount of attention as when it had been played on Peel's show. The decision was made to move the release to 13 December to put it in line for the Christmas number-one slot. It managed to get to number four on the Christmas chart week, being beaten by Westlife's "I Have a Dream". The song did, however, top John Peel's Festive Fifty for that year. In Ireland, the song peaked at number 19 on the week of Christmas. In March 2000, it made a brief appeared on the New Zealand Singles Chart, peaking at number 27.

== Reception ==
The song garnered extreme reactions. Music journalist Charles Shaar Murray said the song was "eloquent in its sheer vacuity" during a highbrow debate on Channel 4 News, and Cliff Richard, whose song "The Millennium Prayer", which had been number 1 in the three weeks before the chart debut of "Cognoscenti vs. Intelligentsia" and was released to very negative reviews, said the song was "awful" during an appearance on Newsround.

The band's performance on Top of the Pops of the song, reportedly unaired, saw the band dressed in lab coats and covered in cobwebs. Because of the relative obscurity of the Cuban Boys both before and after the single, they are generally considered to be a one-hit wonder. The people behind the Cuban Boys went on to score further one-hit wonder successes with a remake of "Rhinestone Cowboy" with Glen Campbell, a novelty kids band called the Barndance Boys, and the US club hit "I Am Gothic" under the name Spray.

== Track listings ==
UK CD and cassette single

1. "Cognoscenti vs Intelligentsia"
2. "Fluorescent Dream Beams"
3. "Datacrime"

European 12-inch single

A1. "Cognoscenti vs Intelligentsia"
A2. "Cognoscenti vs Intelligentsia" (shuffle mix)
B1. "Fluorescent Dream Beams"
B2. "Datacrime"

European maxi-CD single

1. "Cognoscenti vs Intelligentsia"
2. "Cognoscenti vs Intelligentsia" (radio mix)
3. "Fluorescent Dream Beams"
4. "Datacrime"
5. "Cognoscenti vs Intelligentsia" (shuffle mix)
6. "Cognoscenti vs Intelligentsia" (enhanced video)

== Charts ==
=== Weekly charts ===
Chart (1999–2000)	Peak position
Europe (Eurochart Hot 100)	21
New Zealand (Recorded Music NZ)	27
Ireland (IRMA)	19
Scottish Singles Sales (Official Charts)	3
UK Singles (Official Charts)	4

=== Year-end charts ===
Chart (1999)	Position
UK Singles (OCC)	90
