= Cuban Boys =

English electronic music group

- Origin: Torquay, England
- Genres: Dance, synthpop
- Years active: 1998–present
- Labels: Org Records, EMI, House of Beauty
- Members: Ricardo Autobahn; Skreen B
- Past members: Jenny McLaren; BL Underwood

Cuban Boys are an English electronic group and production team, currently composed of Skreen B and Ricardo Autobahn; the band formerly also included B.L. Underwood ("Blu") and Jenny McLaren (Autobahn's sister). Their music is characterised by fast electronic beats, heavy reliance upon samples and the repetition of the name drop "The Cuban Boys" in the background of many of their tracks. They achieved success after being aired on John Peel's BBC Radio 1 show with sample-heavy dance tracks and cut-ups and were responsible for the UK No. 4 hit single "Cognoscenti vs. Intelligentsia" which was released through EMI.

== Band formation ==
The Cuban Boys formed in 1998 using the Internet as a publicity and collaboration tool from the outset. After a web-only release of an anonymous dance track, "Diophantus Arithmetica", with hints that it was by Noel Gallagher, they recorded "Oh My God! They Killed Kenny" (later retitled "Kenny"), which featured sampled dialogue from South Park combined with "The Bump" by Kenny. This was played extensively by John Peel and took the 6th position in the 1998 Festive Fifty. Following this it was released as the band's first single. A six-track EP, Blueprint for Modernisation, followed. A track from this EP, "Cuban Boy (Cuban Boys Go Boom! Mix)", went on to be used as the theme music for the BBC sitcom Still Game.

== "Cognoscenti vs. Intelligentsia" ==
The Cuban Boys' next single, "Cognoscenti vs. Intelligentsia" was built on a sample used from "Whistle Stop" by Roger Miller which was featured in the Disney movie Robin Hood. It was first featured online as part of the Hampster Dance song on the website of the same name. It was picked up by producer Jonathan King who championed it and found a label to release it. The same sample was later used as the basis for the song "Irritating Hamster" by DJ Mavica, then as part of the Cuban Boys' hit (a close but noticeably different imitation of the original sample was used in the final release, as the licensing fees could not be met).

"Cognoscenti vs. Intelligentsia" became a No. 4 hit in the UK in December 1999, outsold only by Westlife, Cliff Richard (with "The Millennium Prayer"), and a re-release of John Lennon's "Imagine". It also took the number one position in the 1999 Festive Fifty.

The Cuban Boys co-wrote Atomic Beat Boy with Helen Love, released as a CD single, followed by a 12-inch remix EP 'Helen Love Vs Cuban Boys: Does Your Heart Go Boom'.

== Eastwood ==
In 2000, the Cuban boys released their first album, Eastwood, through EMI but, despite the popularity of "Cognoscenti vs. Intelligentsia", Eastwood suffered poor sales. It was not released in time to capitalise on the success of "Cognoscenti vs. Intelligentsia" and was given limited marketing. Some of the older tunes featuring unauthorised samples had them replaced by obvious imitations.

Following the commercial failure of Eastwood, the band were dropped by the label and left with some bitterness, later expressed through their releasing of a 7-inch cover version of the Sex Pistols' "EMI".

== Later work ==
Commercially, little was heard of the band itself after Eastwood, although they released several limited release singles and EPs. The band focused mainly on Internet downloads, and made much of their early discography available free of charge from their various websites and on Myspace. All the members became involved in other projects and although the Cuban Boys never formally split up, the band ceased to be active around 2001. Its members continued to work together under various names, most notably Spray.

Following the death of John Peel in 2004, the Cuban Boys (now consisting only of Skreen B and Ricardo Autobahn) reformed to release a tribute song, "The Nation Needs You", as a free download. Following this, they returned to producing individual tracks, releasing some of them as download-only or limited release CD singles. In 2008, they released their first full album since Eastwood, The Satellite Junkyard on their own record label, House of Beauty.

In 2010, the Cuban Boys released a greatest hits compilation of their singles. Art vs Commerce amounted to twenty one tracks, and was released once again on House of Beauty Records. The cover for the CD consists of a booklet with new artwork and a detailed history of the band.

Their third album, Machines was released in 2017.

== Related acts ==
Members of the Cuban Boys have also worked on music under various names:

- The Beatbox Saboteurs (Skreen B and BL Underwood)
- Wave Runner
- Space Kats
- Spray (McLaren and Autobahn)
- Dynamo Beat (Skreen B and BL Underwood)
- PigynClust (Skreen B and BL Underwood)
- Blu Thunder (BL Underwood)
- Ricardo Autobahn (solo)
- Rikki & Daz (Ricardo Autobahn and Daz Sampson)
- The Barndance Boys (Ricardo Autobahn and Daz Sampson)
- Lolly Pop (Autobahn and McLaren)

== Discography ==
=== Albums ===
- Eastwood, EMI (2000)
- The Satellite Junkyard, House of Beauty / self-published (2008)
- Art vs Commerce - The Singles Collection, House of Beauty / self-published (2010)
- Machines, self-published (2017)

Additionally, the Cuban Boys have featured on alternative compilation albums such as Damaged Goods' Totally Damaged sampler (unique track) and have done remix work featuring on other bands' singles and EPs, e.g. Helen Love.

=== Singles and EPs ===
- "Oh My God! They Killed Kenny!", Rough Trade Shop (1998) (7-inch single, limited edition of 1000)
- Blueprint for Modernisation EP, Org Records (1998) (6 track CD, limited edition of 1000)
- "Cognoscenti vs. Intelligentsia", EMI (1999) - UK No. 4
- "Inertia Kicks", Stone the Kubist Records / self-published (2000)
- Old Skool for Scoundrels EP, Prim & Proper / self-published (2000) (7-inch EP on yellow vinyl, limited edition of 1000)
- "EMI", Damaged Goods (2000) (7-inch single)
- "Drink" (originally "Drink Drink Drink"), Sanctuary Records (2001) (unreleased promotional CD)
- "The Nation Needs You", self-published (2005) (promotional CD and free download)
- "Spooky!", self-published (2007)
- "The Penthouse Messiahs", self-published (2008)
- "Summer Song", self-published (2009)
- "All Girls Have a Volvo", self-published (2009)
- "I'm Backing Britain", self-published (2009) (promotional CD)
- "Datacrime 2011", self-published (2011) (downloadable single)

== See also ==
- Ricardo Autobahn
- Rikki & Daz
- Barndance Boys
