= Barndance Boys =

English trio

- Origin: London, England
- Genres: Folktronica, pop, dance
- Years active: 2003
- Members: Daz Sampson (Darren Sampson); Ricardo Autobahn (John Matthews); Brian LH

The Barndance Boys was an English trio musical formation made as a country and folk dance act in 2003. Barndance Boys was the brainchild of John Matthews (stage name Ricardo Autobahn) from the Cuban Boys fame. He launched the novelty band with Darren Sampson known as Daz Sampson, with whom he had cooperated in many other musical projects including in the duo Rikki & Daz. Brian LH was also included to complete the trio.

Barndance Boys were infamous for their papier mache grossly exaggerated heads. The single "Yippie-i-oh" by the band spent two weeks on the UK Singles Chart. It topped at position 32 on the 37th and 38th weeks of the chart in 2003 featuring vocals from Jenny McLaren also from Cuban Boys fame . The tune of "Yippie-i-oh" is largely based on the traditional folk song "I'll Tell Me Ma" also known colloquially as "The Belle of Belfast City".

Year	Song	UK Singles Chart	Irish Top 20	Album
2003	"Yippie-i-oh"	No. 32		

== See also ==
- Ricardo Autobahn
- Daz Sampson
- Rikki & Daz
