= Daz Sampson =

British musician and football manager (born 1974)

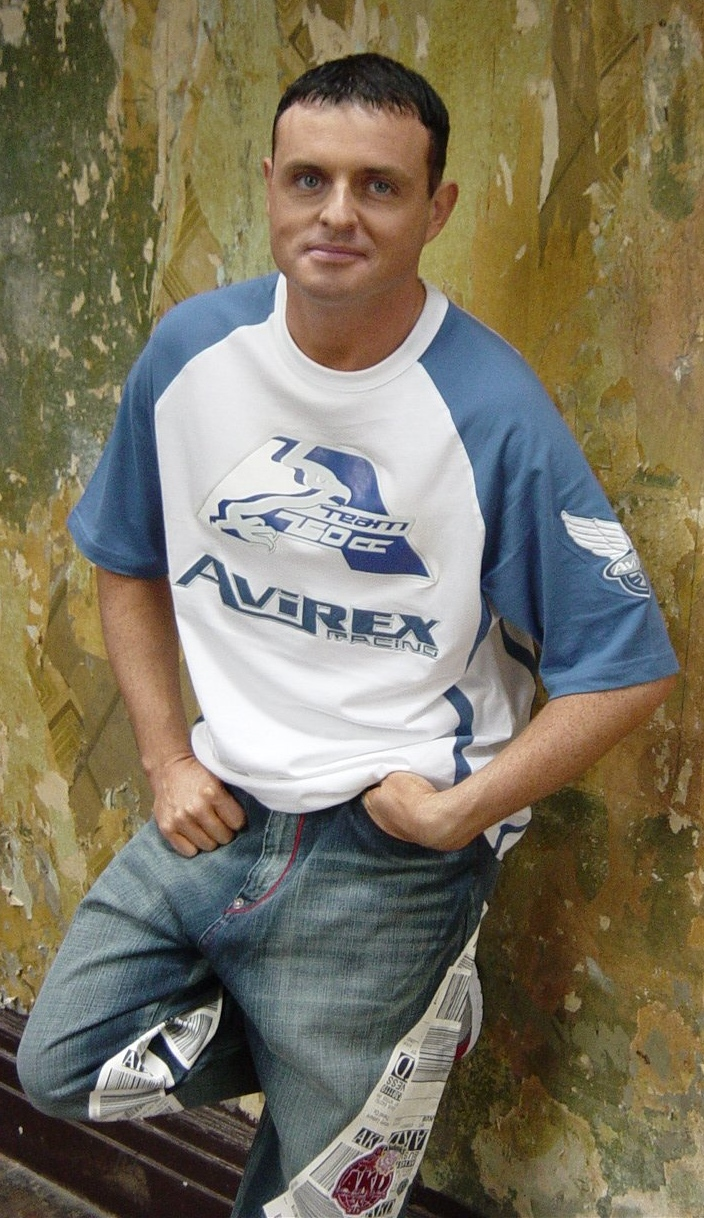
- Sampson in 2005
- Born: Darren Sampson; 28 November 1974 (age 51); Stockport, Greater Manchester, England
- Occupations: Rapper; singer-songwriter; record producer; football manager; radio presenter
- Years active: 1998–present

Darren "Daz" Sampson (born 28 November 1974) is a British singer-songwriter, rapper, record producer, and football manager. Sampson is known for his commercial dance music, as part of several groups, and his television appearances. He has had nine Top 30 UK singles.

In 2006, he represented the UK in the Eurovision Song Contest with "Teenage Life", a top 10 hit. He also established Sporting Riff Raff Records and has continued to perform and release recordings.

He has been involved as a professional football manager in the United Kingdom, continental Europe, Asia, and the United States. In May 2016, he became the North West of England scout for Scottish Championship team Ayr United F.C. He also has close links to English team Stockport County F.C.

In February 2020, he accepted the role as first team manager of Phuentsholing United FC, a team in the Bhutan Premier League. Sampson was due to undertake his duties at the start of April 2020; however, with the outbreak of the COVID-19 pandemic, he remained in the UK.

== Early career ==
Sampson was born in Stockport, England, and went into radio broadcasting at 17 after an injury halted a potential career as a pro footballer. He spent several years working within commercial radio as well as Radio Luxembourg; from there he made the transition from playing music to making music.

=== Bus Stop ===
Sampson had his first chart success with the group Bus Stop (with Graham Turner, Mark Hall, and Nikki Reid (Lane)). Bus Stop had four UK hits, the most successful being "Kung Fu Fighting" featuring Carl Douglas, which sold 250,000 copies in the UK and over one million worldwide.

BBC Radio 1 DJ Chris Moyles responded to a letter from Sampson by championing his records on the station and inviting him to contribute comedy moments on his radio show. During this period, Sampson was almost a daily guest on the Radio 1 show, and from this came a deal with BMG for his act Blown Out.

Other Bus Stop hits included remakes of "You Ain't Seen Nothin' Yet" featuring Randy Bachman, "Jump" by Van Halen, and "Get It On" by T. Rex.

Many of the Bus Stop songs and remakes have been featured on the Dancemania series. Because of the deal that Konami had with Toshiba EMI back then, some of Bus Stop songs made it to the popular game series Dance Dance Revolution, including "Kung Fu Fighting", "Kick the Can", "Swing It", "One Two (Little Bitch)", "Na-Na", "Swing It", and "Long Train Runnin'"

=== Fraud Squad ===
As the Bus Stop project was folding, in 2000, Daz Sampson formed a duo with JJ Mason. As Fraud Squad, the duo released "Together (We Can Make It)" which was popular in European night clubs, and was a hit single in France, spending seven weeks in the official French singles chart. JJ Mason made many remixes of Daz Sampson and Rikki and Daz songs, including "The Woah Song" and "Teenage Life".

=== Sampson & Mason ===
Daz Sampson and JJ Mason would return in 2006 with two releases under the name Sampson & Mason, "The Crown" and "The Feeling".

=== Rikki & Daz ===
In this period, Sampson formed Rikki & Daz with John Matthews (aka Ricardo Autobahn, hence "Rikki") of the Cuban Boys. Their 2002 single "Rhinestone Cowboy (Giddy Up Giddy Up)", featuring a new vocal from country music legend Glen Campbell, reached No. 12 in the UK. Another release as Rikki and Daz was the remake of DJ Bobo's hit "Chihuahua". credited to "Rikki & Daz Vs. JJ Mason Remix".

=== Barndance Boys / DJ Daz ===
The pair continued to work together under various names, including The Barndance Boys (for the minor hit single "Yippie I Oh") and DJ Daz ("The Woah Song", a remake of Baltimora's "Tarzan Boy"). Matthews later co-wrote Sampson's Eurovision song, "Teenage Life".

=== Uniting Nations ===
In 2004, Sampson returned to the Liverpool dance music scene, and he formed a partnership with producer Paul Keenan and under the name Uniting Nations. They released "Out of Touch", a remake of a Hall & Oates hit, which sold 150,000 copies of the single in the United Kingdom and became a European hit. Other big hits included "You And Me" (which reached No. 15 in the UK), proving yet another hit in Europe, and "Ai No Corrida", which reached No. 18, also in the UK. Smash Hits readers and T4 viewers voted Uniting Nations "Best Dance Act" at the last ever Poll Winners Party in 2005. Sampson also had three number one singles in Poland with Uniting Nations.

== Eurovision Song Contest ==
=== Eurovision 2006 ===
On 4 March 2006, Sampson won the BBC show Making Your Mind Up with the song "Teenage Life", written and produced with his long-time collaborator John Matthews. The accompanying dance routine involved four young women dressed as schoolgirls, dubbed The Sampsonites.

The song was a commercial success prior to Eurovision becoming a Top 10 hit for him on the UK Singles Chart with the single released on 14 May 2006 just prior to the contest. Sampson represented the UK in the Eurovision Song Contest on 20 May 2006 in Athens, but only 10 of the 39 eligible countries voted for Sampson and his total score was 25 points, placing him 19th out of the 24 acts.

Although he finished low down the rankings in the Eurovision Song Contest, he enjoyed success in the British charts. "Teenage Life" entered at number 13 in the UK Top 40. In the week following the contest, the publicity he had gained from this exposure helped his single to climb to number eight in the UK chart. Sampson claims that his performance may have raised the popularity of Eurovision in the UK, with the 2006 contest attracting half the UK TV audience.

=== Eurovision 2007 ===
After Eurovision, he said he would like to return to try for Eurovision Song Contest 2007. However, he later he announced that the BBC decided it was too soon for him to enter again, but he would be welcome in a few years time. Still he produced the song entitled "Do A Little Dance" but it did not make British Eurovision: Your Decision shortlist of songs for consideration.

=== Eurovision 2019 ===
Sampson, along with British singer Nona, attempted to represent Belarus in the Eurovision Song Contest 2019 with a song entitled "Kinky Boots". It was not selected for the live final, which was won by ZENA.

=== Eurovision 2021 ===
Sampson joined forces with the Belarusian singer Katya Ocean for an attempt to represent Belarus in the Eurovision Song Contest 2021 with a song Give you love. The song was not selected by the Belarusian broadcaster BTRC, and Belarus were later disqualified from the contest.

== Other musical projects ==
=== Sporting Riff Raff Records ===
In 2006, Sampson established his own record company, Sporting Riff Raff Records with Ben O'Brien and Joe Taylor of Nuxx. The acts that recorded with the company, mainly hit pop/dance/disco bands were The Star Alliance, Spray, Mr. Fix It, Love Djs, Project 4.

=== Sampson & Mason ===
He collaborated with several artists and released in 2006 "The Crown" and "The Feeling" under the name Sampson & Mason in partnership with JJ Mason (of Fraud Squad).

=== Bandito ===
Daz Sampson and his long term writing partner John Matthews created in 2009 a dance act under the name Bandito after landing a record deal with Ministry of Sound's Hard2Beat Records. Bandito's debit solo "Rockin' At the Disco" featured vocals from Russell Graham of the boy band Pacific Avenue.

=== TV and radio ===
Sampson and John Matthews were to write the music score for a new Children's BBC CBBC animation show which was set to air summer 2013.

Since 2011, Sampson returned to a career in radio broadcasting in signing a deal with NBC/Universal where he stars in his own reality documentary show.

== Football career ==
Sampson started his career as a footballer, spending his youth years at Manchester City's Junior Blues side, before being spotted by ex-Brighton manager Jimmy Melia whilst managing at Stockport. Following injury Sampson then quit the game as a player going on to manage and coach at semi-pro level.

In 2012, Sampson came out of retirement and played games for Guam Shipyard, based in Guam, an island in the Pacific Ocean. He then went on to coach and lead the Shipyard to a cup final win, and regular top 3 finishes. After two seasons Sampson moved to Tampa in Florida to take charge of a new semi-professional team about to franchise into fourth tier of the MLS.

In 2015, Sampson returned to the UK and briefly took over a Step 6 Billinge FC in Cheshire, and then to Ashton Town.

Following Sampson's stint in England, he moved back briefly to Guam to take over a second tier side Big Blue, where they finished top of the league with 100 points.

== Discography ==
=== Albums ===
With Bus Stop

- 1998: Ticket to Ride
- 2000: Get It On
- 2002: Bustin' Rhymes & Melodies

=== Singles ===
Year	Artist/Group	Song	Peak chart positions				Notes
Year	Artist/Group	Song	UK	UK (DL)	IRE	FRA	Notes
1998	Bus Stop	"Kung Fu Fighting" (feat. Carl Douglas)	8	-	-	25	Originally by Carl Douglas
1998	Bus Stop	"You Ain't Seen Nothin' Yet" (feat. Randy Bachman)	22	-	-	-	Originally by Randy Bachman
1999	Bus Stop	"Jump"	23	-	-	-	Originally by Van Halen
2000	Bus Stop	"Get It On" (feat. T. Rex)	59	-	-	-	Originally by T. Rex
2000	Bus Stop	"One Two (Little Bitch)"	-	-	-	-	Originally by the Specials
2000	Bus Stop	"Footloose"	-	-	-	-	Originally by Kenny Loggins
2001	Bus Stop	"Kick the Can"	-	-	-	-	Re-working of Infernal Gallop from Orpheus in the Underworld by Jacques Offenbach
2001	Bus Stop	"Na-Na"	-	-	-	-	Remake of "Goodbye" by Steam
2001	Bus Stop	"Swing It"	-	-	-	-	Originally by the Champs and titled "Tequila"
2001	Bus Stop	"Long Train Runnin'"	-	-	-	-	Originally by The Doobie Brothers
2001	Fraud Squad	"Together (We Can Make It)"	-	-	-	65	
2002	Rikki & Daz	"Rhinestone Cowboy" (feat. Glen Campbell)	12	-	16	-	Originally by Glen Campbell
2003	Barndance Boys	"Yippie I Oh"	32	-	-	-	Re-working of traditional song "I'll Tell Me Ma"
2003	DJ Daz	"Woah Song"	-	-	-	-	Originally by Baltimora and titled "Tarzan Boy"
2004	Uniting Nations	"Out of Touch"	7	-	5	-	Originally by Hall & Oates
2005	Uniting Nations	"You and Me"	15	-	26	-	
2005	Uniting Nations	"Ai No Corrida"	18	-	37	-	
2006	Uniting Nations	"Music In Me"	-	-	-	-	
2006	Daz Sampson	"Teenage Life"	8	11	-	-	UK Eurovision entry
2007	Daz Sampson	"Do a Little Dance"	-	-	-	-	Download only
2007	Daz Sampson	"The County Song (Jim Gannon's Army Goes Marching On)"	182	17	-	-	Download only
2007	Uniting Nations	"Do It Yourself"	-	-	-	-	
2008	Uniting Nations	"Pressure Us"	-	-	-	-	Featuring Lucia Horn
2009	Bandito	"Rockin' At the Disco"	-	-	-	-	Featuring Russell Graham
2019	Daz Samspon & Nona	"Kinky Boots"	-	-	-	-	Belarus Eurovision 2019 Entry Submission
2021	Daz Samspon & Katya Ocean	"Give You Love"	-	-	-	-	Belarus Eurovision 2021 Entry Submission
"—" denotes a single that did not chart or was not released in that territory.

=== Others songs ===
Year	Song title	Credited to	Charts FR	Notes
1999	"Roots (Feel Too High)"	Sunshine State featuring Daz	—	
2000	"Together (We Can Make It)"	Fraud Squad	65	align=center | Made up of Daz Sampson and JJ Mason
2006	"The Crown"	Sampson & Mason	—	align=center | Made up of Daz Sampson and JJ Mason
2006	"The Feeling"	Sampson & Mason	—	align=center | Made up of Daz Sampson and JJ Mason

== See also ==
- Ricardo Autobahn
- Rikki & Daz
- Barndance Boys
- Uniting Nations

Preceded by Javine with "Touch My Fire"	UK in the Eurovision Song Contest; 2006	Succeeded by Scooch with "Flying the Flag (for You)"
