= Chihuahua (song) =

Single by DJ BoBo

from the album Visions
- B-side: "Celebration"; Remix
- Released: 26 March 2003
- Recorded: 2002
- Genre: Eurodance; electro swing
- Length: 3:01
- Label: BMG
- Songwriters: Peter René Baumann; Axel Breitung; Ray Gilbert; Louis Oliveira
- Producers: Peter René Baumann; Axel Breitung

DJ BoBo singles chronology
"Colors of Life" (2001)	"Chihuahua" (2003)	"Celebration" (2003)

"Chihuahua" is a song recorded by Swiss artist DJ BoBo. It was the first single from his tenth album, Visions, and was released in early 2003 in many countries. It was his most successful single, topping the charts in France, Spain and Switzerland and becoming the summer hit of the year. It can also be considered as DJ BoBo's signature song.

== History ==
=== Background ===
The song "Chihuahua" is based on Latin pop hit single of the same name by Louis Oliveira and His Bandodalua Boys.

=== Hit success and releases ===
The song became the sixth best-selling single of the 21st century in France, with 1.020.000 units sold.

"Chihuahua" also features on DJ BoBo's compilations Chihuahua (2002) and Greatest Hits (2006), and on the live albums Live in Concert (2003) and Vampires Are Alive – The Show (2008).

=== Videoclip and usage in the media ===
There were two music videos, the first (and most well-known) one having been produced as an animated feature. The song, which was accompanied with a choreographed dance, was used for a French TV advert for Coca-Cola. In Beverly Hills Chihuahua, “Chihuahua” is used as the main theme for the movie that is also used in its sequels Beverly Hills Chihuahua 2 and Beverly Hills Chihuahua 3: Viva La Fiesta!.

== Cover versions ==
In the same year, the song was covered by The Booming People, and achieved a moderate success (number 60 in France, number in Flanders and number two in Wallonia. Also in 2003, Brazilian singer Eliana covered this song as "Meu Cachorrinho (Chihuahua)" and released as a single, with new lyrics written in Portuguese.

In December 2004, "Chihuahua" was covered by Cantopop singer Joey Yung. In 2005, Greek band Candy Girls recorded a Greek version of the song. In 2008, the Belgian child group Dalton Sisters covered the song in Dutch for the Dutch version of Beverly Hills Chihuahua.

== Track listings ==
CD single

1. "Chihuahua" – 3:01
2. "Celebration" – 3:15
3. "Celebration" (video)

CD single

1. "Chihuahua" – 3:01
2. "Chihuahua" (2002 XNT remix) – 3:17

CD maxi

1. "Chihuahua" (radio version) – 2:57
2. "Chihuahua" (XTN remix) – 3:17
3. "Chihuahua" (Original Karaoke) – 2:57
4. "Chihuahua" (Mel Merret remix) – 6:03
5. "Chihuahua" (Rikki + Daz vs JJ Mason remix) – 5:56

CD maxi

1. "Chihuahua" (radio version) – 2:57
2. "Chihuahua" (XTN remix) – 3:17
3. "Chihuahua" (Original Karaoke) – 2:57
4. "No More Pain" – 4:22
5. "Angel" DJ BoBo with Patricia Manterola – 3:22

CD maxi

1. "Chihuahua" (radio edit) – 2:57
2. "Chihuahua" (XTN remix) – 3:17
3. "Chihuahua" (Mel Merrett remix) – 6:03
4. "Chihuahua" (Rikki & Dazz remix) – 5:55

CD maxi

1. "Chihuahua"
2. "Chihuahua" (XTN remix)
3. "Chihuahua" (Kon-Chihuahua remix) DJ BoBo featuring DJ Poppo

12" maxi

1. "Chihuahua" (radio version) – 2:57
2. "Chihuahua" (XTN remix) – 3:17

CD single – Remixes

1. "Chihuahua" (Rikki & Daz radio version) – 3:03
2. "Chihuahua" (Rikki & Daz remix) – 5:55

== Personnel ==
- Composed by Ray Gilbert, Louis Oliveira, René Baumann and Axel Breitung
- Lyrics by René Baumann
- Co-produced by Axel Breitung

Radio edit version + instrumental)

- Arranged, produced and mixed by René Baumann & Axel Breitung at Bishop Studios, Hamburg
- Vocal editing by Kay M. Nickold
- Lyrics controlling by Nancy Baumann

XTN remix

- Produced by René Baumann and Axel Breitung
- Remixed by Xasqui Ten

"No More Pain"

- Music and lyrics by René Baumann and Axel Breitung
- Arranged, produced, recorded and mixed by René Baumann and Axel Breitung at Bishop Studios, Hamburg
- Vocals, choir and adlibs by Christiane Eiben, Lesley Bogaert, Anthony Moriah
- Vocal editing by Kay M. Nickold
- Lyrics controlling by Nancy Baumann

"Angel"

- Music and lyrics by René Baumann, Axel Breitung
- Arranged, produced, recorded and mixed by René Baumann and Axel Breitung at Bishop Studios, Hamburg
- Guitars by Axel Breitung
- Vocals by Patricia Manterola and DJ BoBo
- Vocal editing by Kay M. Nickold
- Lyrics controlling by Nancy Baumann

== Charts and sales ==
=== Weekly charts ===
Chart (2003)	Peak position
Australia (ARIA)	73
Austria (Ö3 Austria Top 40)	48
Belgium (Ultratop 50 Flanders)	8
Belgium (Ultratop 50 Wallonia)	23
Czech Republic (IFPI)	3
Finland (Suomen virallinen lista)	12
France (SNEP)	1
Germany (Media Control Charts)	19
Hungary (Single Top 40)	1
Ireland (IRMA)	10
Italy (FIMI)	2
Netherlands (Mega Top 100)	41
Norway (VG-lista)	15
Poland (Polish Airplay Charts)	29
Romania (Romanian Top 100)	10
Spain (AFYVE)	1
Sweden (Sverigetopplistan)	10
Switzerland (Schweizer Hitparade)	1
United Kingdom (The Official Charts Company)	36

=== Year-end charts ===
Chart (2003)	Position
Belgium (Ultratop 50 Flanders)	70
Belgium (Ultratop 50 Wallonia)	63
Europe (Eurochart Hot 100)	8
France (SNEP)	1
Germany (Media Control GfK)	85
Ireland (IRMA)	74
Italy (FIMI)	12
Romania (Romanian Top 100)	74
Switzerland (Schweizer Hitparade)	1

== Certifications ==
Certifications and sales for "Chihuahua"
Region	Certification	Certified units/sales
Belgium (BRMA)	Gold	25,000^{*}
France (SNEP)	Diamond	1,020,000
Italy (FIMI)	Gold	25,000^{*}
Switzerland (IFPI Switzerland)	Platinum	40,000^{^}
Summaries
Worldwide	—	1,600,000
^{*} Sales figures based on certification alone.^{^} Shipments figures based on certification alone.
