= Eurovision Song Contest =

Annual international song competition

- Logo since 2026
- Genre: Music competition
- Created by: European Broadcasting Union
- Based on: Sanremo Music Festival
- Presented by: Various presenters
- Countries of origin: Various participating countries
- Original languages: Various; primarily English and French
- No. of episodes: 70 contests; 110 live shows

Production
- Production locations: Various host cities
- Running time: ~2 hours (semi-finals); ~4 hours (finals)
- Production companies: European Broadcasting Union; Various national broadcasters

Original release
- Release: 24 May 1956 – present

Related
- Junior Eurovision Song Contest; Eurovision Song Contest Asia; OTI Festival; American Song Contest

The Eurovision Song Contest (ESC for short; French: Concours Eurovision de la chanson), often known simply as Eurovision, is an international song competition organised annually by the European Broadcasting Union (EBU) since 1956. Each participating broadcaster submits an original song representing its country to be performed live via the Eurovision and Euroradio networks, and then casts votes for the other countries' songs to determine a winner.

Inspired by the Italian Sanremo Music Festival held since 1951, the Eurovision Song Contest has been held annually since 1956 (except for 2020 due to the COVID-19 pandemic), making it the longest-running international music competition on television and one of the world's longest-running television programmes. EBU members and invited associates are eligible to compete; broadcasters from 52 countries have participated at least once. Each participating broadcaster sends an original song of three minutes duration or less to be performed live by a singer, or group of up to six people, aged 16 or older, of its choice; the minimum age will be raised to 18 starting in 2027. Each country awards 1–8, 10, and 12 points to their ten favourite songs, based on the views of an assembled group of music professionals and their viewing public, with the song receiving the most points declared the winner.

The event also features opening and interval acts and guest performances every year; such as Cirque du Soleil, Madonna, Justin Timberlake, Mika, Madcon, Rita Ora, and the first performance of Riverdance. Originally consisting of a single event, the contest has expanded as broadcasters from new countries joined (including non-European Israel, Morocco, and Australia), leading to the introduction of relegation procedures in the 1990s, before the creation of semi-finals in the 2000s. Germany has competed more than any other country, having participated in all but one edition, while Ireland and Sweden hold the record for the most victories, with seven wins each.

Traditionally held in the country that won the preceding year's event, the contest provides an opportunity to promote it as a tourist destination, with thousands of attendees each year. Alongside the generic logo of the contest, a unique theme is typically developed for each event. The contest has aired in countries across all continents ranking among the world's most watched non-sporting events every year, with hundreds of millions of viewers globally. It has been also available online via the official website since 2001. Performing at the contest has often provided artists with a local career boost and in some cases long-lasting international success. Several of the best-selling music artists in the world have competed, including ABBA, Céline Dion, Cliff Richard, Flo Rida, Julio Iglesias, and Olivia Newton-John. Some of the world's best-selling singles were first performed to an international audience at Eurovision.

The contest has gained popularity for its camp appeal, its span of ethnic and international styles, and its importance to LGBTQ culture, resulting in a large active fanbase and an influence on popular culture. Similar events have been organised by the EBU or created by external organisations. Concerns have been raised regarding political allegiances and rivalries between countries potentially influencing results. Controversies have included participating broadcasters withdrawing at a late stage, censorship of broadcast segments by broadcasters, disqualification of contestants, as well as political events impacting participation. It has also been criticised for an abundance of elaborate stage shows at the cost of artistic merit.

== History ==
=== Origins ===
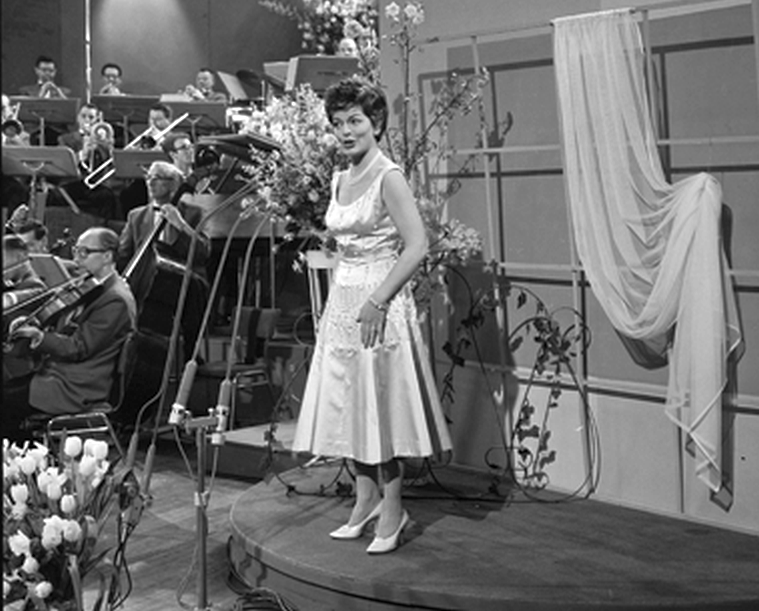
Lys Assia, the winner of the first Eurovision Song Contest in 1956, performing at the 1958 contest

The European Broadcasting Union (EBU) was formed in 1950 among 23 broadcasting organisations. The word "Eurovision" was first used by British journalist George Campey in the Evening Standard in 1951, when he referred to a British Broadcasting Corporation (BBC) programme being relayed by Dutch television. Following several events broadcast internationally via their Eurovision transmission network in the early 1950s, including the coronation of Elizabeth II in 1953, an EBU committee, headed by Marcel Bezençon, was formed in January 1955 to investigate new initiatives for cooperation between broadcasters, which approved for further study a European song competition from an idea initially proposed by Radiotelevisione italiana (RAI) manager Sergio Pugliese. The EBU's general assembly agreed to the organising of the song contest in October 1955, under the initial title of the European Grand Prix, and accepted a proposal by the Swiss Broadcasting Corporation (SRG SSR) to host the event in Lugano in the spring of 1956. The Italian Sanremo Music Festival, held since 1951, was used as a basis for the initial planning of the contest, with several amendments and additions given its international nature. The Eurovision Song Contest was developed as a way of putting transnational live television to the test, promoting television, as well as encouraging the production of original songs.

=== Developments ===
Broadcasters from seven countries participated in the first contest, with each country represented by two songs; the only time in which multiple entries per country were permitted. The winning song was "Refrain", representing the host country Switzerland and performed by Lys Assia. Voting during the first contest was held behind closed doors, with only the winner being announced on stage; the use of a scoreboard and public announcement of the voting, inspired by the BBC's Festival of British Popular Songs, began in 1957. The tradition of the winning broadcaster hosting the following year's contest, which has since become a standard feature of the event, began in 1958. Technological developments have transformed the contest: colour broadcasts began in 1968; and streaming in 2000. Broadcasts in widescreen began in 2005 and in high definition in 2007.

By the 1960s, between 16 and 18 countries were regularly competing each year. Countries from outside the traditional boundaries of Europe began entering the contest, and countries in Western Asia and North Africa started competing in the 1970s and 1980s. Apart from Yugoslavia (a member of the non-aligned movement and not seen as part of the Eastern Bloc at the time) no socialist or communist country ever participated. (Note: However, its Eastern European counterpart, the Intervision Song Contest, organised by the International Radio and Television Organisation (OIRT), which held four editions in 1977–1980 saw the participation of Western countries – including some from outside Europe like Canada – in addition to the Eastern Bloc countries.) Only after the end of the Cold War did other countries from Central and Eastern Europe participate for the first time – some of those countries having gained or regained their independence in the course of the breakup of Yugoslavia, Czechoslovakia, and the Soviet Union. As a consequence, more broadcasters were now applying than could feasibly participate in a one-night-event of reasonable length. Numerous solutions to this problem were tried out over the years. The 1993 contest included a contest called Kvalifikacija za Millstreet which was a pre-qualifying round for seven of these new countries, and from 1994, relegation systems were introduced to manage the number of competing entries, with the poorest performing countries barred from entering the following year's contest. From 2004, the contest expanded to become a multi-programme event, with a semi-final at the 49th contest allowing all interested countries to compete each year; a second semi-final was added to each edition from 2008.

There have been 70 contests as of 2026, making Eurovision the longest-running annual international televised music competition as determined by Guinness World Records. The contest has been listed as one of the longest-running television programmes in the world and among the world's most watched non-sporting events. Broadcasters from a total of 52 countries have taken part in at least one edition, with a record 43 countries participating in a single contest, first in 2008 and subsequently in 2011 and 2018.

Eurovision had been held every year until 2020, when that year's contest was cancelled in response to the COVID-19 pandemic. No competitive event was able to take place due to uncertainty caused by the spread of the virus in Europe and the various restrictions imposed by the governments of the participating countries. In its place a special broadcast, Eurovision: Europe Shine a Light, was produced by the organisers, which honoured the songs and artists that would have competed in 2020 in a non-competitive format.

=== Naming ===
The contest has been known by different names in various languages. The first contest was officially named the Gran premio Eurovisione della canzone europea in Italian, the Grand Prix Eurovision de la chanson européenne in French, and the Grand Prix of the Eurovision Song Competition in English, Similar variations, such as Eurovision Schlagerfestival in Swedish or Eurovisie Songfestival in Dutch, were unofficially used in some editions. The names Eurovision Song Contest and Concours Eurovision de la Chanson in French became a de facto standard in subsequent decades. The contest was briefly rebranded as Eurosong in English for the 1996 edition, but this was reverted the following year. The names were not standardised until 2004, when the contest was rebranded. The official brand guidelines specify that translations of the name may be used depending on national tradition and brand recognition in the competing countries, but that the official name Eurovision Song Contest is always preferred.

On only four occasions has the name used for the official logo of the contest not been in English or French: the Italian names Gran Premio Eurovisione della Canzone and Concorso Eurovisione della Canzone were used when Italy hosted the 1965 and 1991 contests respectively; and the Dutch name Eurovisiesongfestival was used when the Netherlands hosted in 1976 and 1980.

== Format ==
Original songs representing participating countries are performed in a live television programme broadcast via the Eurovision and Euroradio networks simultaneously to all countries. A "country" as a participant is represented by one television broadcaster from that country, a member of the EBU, and is typically that country's national public broadcasting organisation. The programme is staged by one of the participant broadcasters and is transmitted from an auditorium in the selected host city. Since 2008, each contest is typically formed of three live television shows held over one week: two semi-finals are held on the Tuesday and Thursday, followed by a final on the Saturday. All participating countries compete in one of the two semi-finals, except for the host country of that year's contest and the "Big" countries whose broadcasters are the contest's biggest financial contributors: France, Germany, Italy, Spain, and the United Kingdom. (Note: Namely France Télévisions, ARD, Radiotelevisione italiana (RAI), Radiotelevisión Española (RTVE), and the British Broadcasting Corporation (BBC) respectively.) The remaining countries are split between the two semi-finals, and the 10 highest-scoring entries in each qualify to produce 26 entries competing in the final. Since the introduction of the semi-final round in 2004, Ukraine is the only country outside of the "Big" countries to have qualified for the final of every contest it has competed in.

Each participating broadcaster has sole discretion over the process it may employ to select its entry for the contest. Typical methods in which participants are selected include a televised national final using a jury and/or public vote; an internal selection by a committee appointed by the broadcaster; and a mixed format where some decisions are made internally and the public are engaged in others. Among the most successful televised selection shows is Melodifestivalen in Sweden, first established in 1959 and now one of the most watched television shows in the country each year.

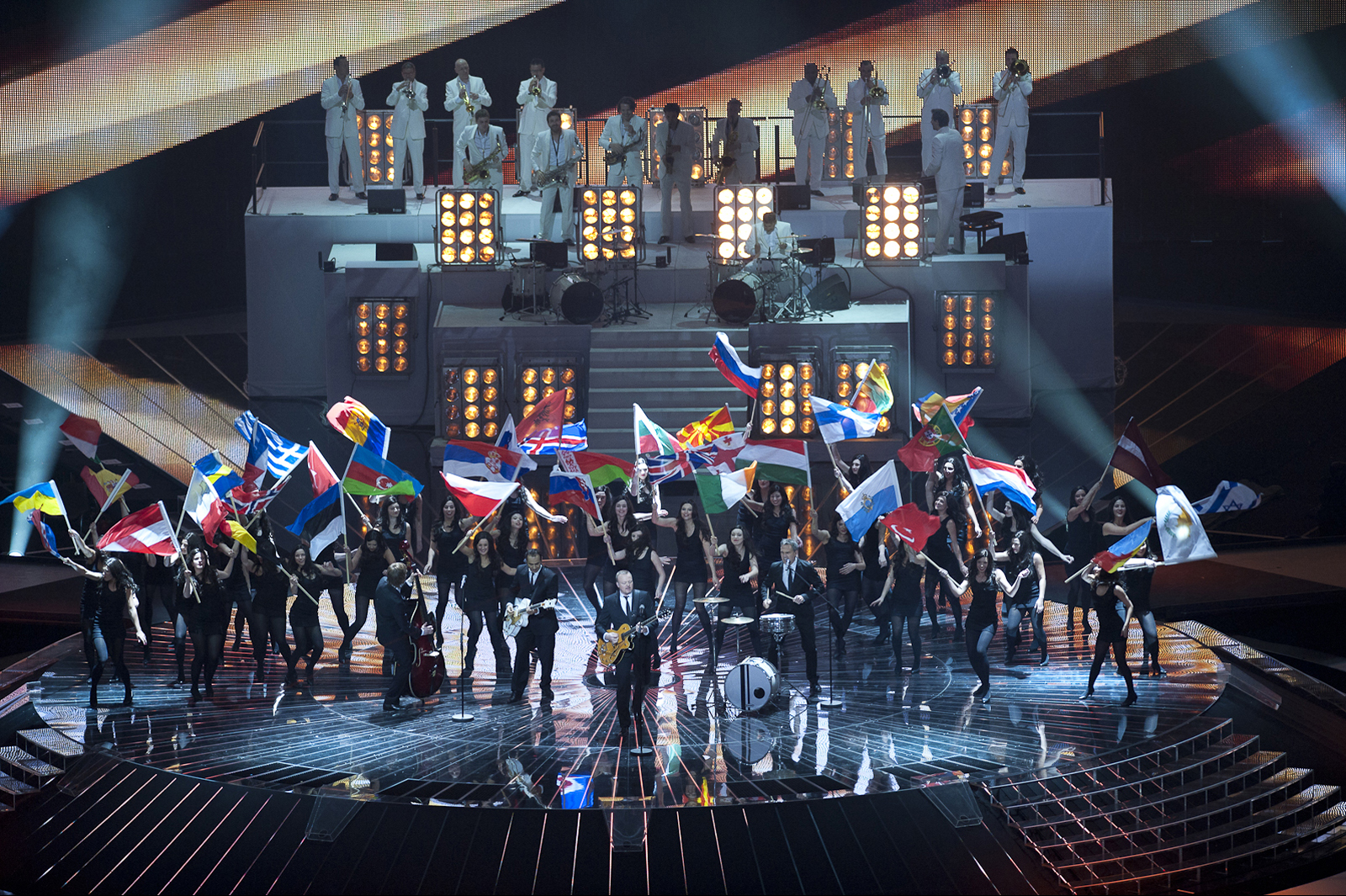
The opening act during the final of the 2011 contest in Düsseldorf, Germany

Each show typically begins with an opening act consisting of music and/or dance performances by invited artists, which contributes to a unique theme and identity created for that year's event; since 2013, the opening of the contest's final has included a "Flag Parade", with competing artists entering the stage behind their country's flag in a similar manner to the procession of competing athletes at the Olympic Games opening ceremony. Viewers are welcomed by one or more presenters who provide key updates during the show, conduct interviews with competing acts from the green room, and guide the voting procedure in English and French. Competing acts perform sequentially, and after all songs have been performed, viewers are invited to vote for their favourite performances—except for the performance of their own country—via telephone, SMS, and the official Eurovision app. The public vote comprises about 50% of the final result alongside the views of a jury of music industry professionals from each country. An interval act is invariably featured during this voting period, which on several occasions has included a well-known personality from the host country or an internationally recognised figure. The results of the voting are subsequently announced; in the semi-finals, the 10 highest-ranked countries are announced in a random order, with the full results undisclosed until after the final. In the final, the presenters call upon a representative spokesperson for each country in turn who announces their jury's points, while the results of the public vote are subsequently announced by the presenters. In recent years, it has been tradition that the first country to announce its jury points is the previous host, whereas the last country is the current host. (Note: With the exception of 2023, when the United Kingdom hosted the contest on behalf of Ukraine, which went first.) The qualifying acts in the semi-finals, and the winning delegation in the final are invited back on stage; in the final, a trophy is awarded to the winning performers and songwriters by the previous year's winner, accompanied by a reprise of the winning song. The full results of the competition, including detailed results of the jury and public vote, are released online shortly after the final, and the participating broadcaster of the winning entry is traditionally given the honour of organising the following year's event.

== Participation ==
Participation since 1956: Entered at least once Never entered, although eligible to do so Entry intended, but later withdrew Competed as a part of another country, but never as a sovereign country

Participants in the Eurovision Song Contest, coloured by decade of debut

Full members (as opposed to associate or ancillary members) of the European Broadcasting Union (EBU) are eligible to participate; full members are those who are located in states that fall within the European Broadcasting Area (EBA) or are member states of the Council of Europe. Full members include media organisations whose broadcasts are often made available to at least 98% of households in their own country which are equipped to receive such transmissions. Since June 2026, broadcasters from states outside the EBA may also apply for full membership, provided that the state is considered by the EBU to have a public service media system aligned with Council of Europe standards, and the state has observer status with the Council of Europe. Associate member broadcasters may be eligible to compete, dependent on approval by the contest's reference group.

The EBA is defined by the International Telecommunication Union as encompassing the geographical area between the boundary of ITU Region 1 in the west, the meridian 40° East of Greenwich in the east, and parallel 30° North in the south. Armenia, Azerbaijan, Georgia, and the parts of Iraq, Jordan, Syria, Turkey, and Ukraine lying outside these limits are also included in the EBA.

Eligibility to participate in the contest is therefore not limited to broadcasters from countries in Europe, as several states geographically outside the boundaries of the continent or which span more than one continent are included in the EBA. Broadcasters from countries in these groups have taken part in past editions, including countries in Western Asia such as Israel and Cyprus, countries which span Europe and Asia like Russia and Turkey, and North African countries such as Morocco.

Australia became the first country without an active EBU member broadcaster to compete, following an invitation by the contest's reference group to associate member Special Broadcasting Service (SBS) ahead of the contest's 60th edition in 2015. Initially announced as a "one-off" for the anniversary edition, SBS was invited back the following year and has subsequently participated every year since. Australia is also the only country from outside the EBA to have taken part. Canada is set to make its debut in 2027, after associate member Canadian Broadcasting Corporation (CBC/Radio-Canada) was accepted as a full member in June 2026. It will be the first country in the Americas and the second from outside the EBA to take part.

EBU members wishing to participate must fulfil conditions as laid down in the rules of the contest, a separate copy of which is drafted annually. A maximum of 44 countries can take part in any one contest. Broadcasters must have paid the EBU a participation fee in advance of the deadline specified in the rules for the year in which they wish to participate; this fee is different for each country based on its size and viewership.

Broadcasters from fifty-two countries have participated at least once. These countries are listed here alongside the year in which they made their debut:

Year	Country making its debut entry
1956	Belgium
1956	France
1956	Germany (Note: Represented West Germany until 1990; East Germany never competed. Presented on all occasions as 'Germany', except in 1967 as 'Federal Republic of Germany', in 1970 and 1976 as 'West Germany', and in 1990 as 'F.R. Germany'.)
1956	Italy
1956	Luxembourg
1956	Netherlands
1956	Switzerland
1957	Austria
1957	Denmark
1957	United Kingdom
1958	Sweden
1959	Monaco
1960	Norway
1961	Finland
1961	Spain
1961	Yugoslavia (Note: Represented the Socialist Federal Republic of Yugoslavia until 1991, and the Federal Republic of Yugoslavia in 1992.)
1964	Portugal
1965	Ireland

Year	Country making its debut entry
1971	Malta
1973	Israel
1974	Greece
1975	Turkey
1980	Morocco
1981	Cyprus
1986	Iceland
1993	Bosnia and Herzegovina
1993	Croatia
1993	Slovenia
1994	Estonia
1994	Hungary
1994	Lithuania
1994	Poland
1994	Romania
1994	Russia
1994	Slovakia
1998	North Macedonia (Note: Presented as the 'Former Yugoslav Republic of Macedonia' before 2019.)

Year	Country making its debut entry
2000	Latvia
2003	Ukraine
2004	Albania
2004	Andorra
2004	Belarus
2004	Serbia and Montenegro
2005	Bulgaria
2005	Moldova
2006	Armenia
2007	Czechia (Note: Presented as 'Czech Republic' before 2023.)
2007	Georgia
2007	Montenegro
2007	Serbia
2008	Azerbaijan
2008	San Marino
2015	Australia (Note: Represented by an EBU associate member broadcaster; initially announced as a one-off participant to commemorate the contest's 60th anniversary, has subsequently participated every year since.)

== Hosting ==
Countries which have hosted the Eurovision Song Contest as of 2026 A single hosting Multiple hostings Never hosted

The winning broadcaster traditionally hosts the following year's event, with some exceptions since 1958. The rules were amended ahead of the 2027 contest to make a winning broadcaster ineligible to host the following edition if an armed conflict or sensitive geopolitical situation affects the security of their state or region, in which case the EBU would commission an independent assessment.

Hosting the contest can be seen as a unique opportunity for promoting the host country as a tourist destination and can provide benefits to the local economy and tourism sectors of the host city. However, there is a perception reflected in popular culture that some broadcasters wish to avoid the costly burden of hosting – sometimes resulting in them sending deliberately subpar entries with no chance of winning. (Note: This belief is mentioned in Eurovision Song Contest: The Story of Fire Saga (2020) and a plot point in the Father Ted episode "A Song for Europe" (1996).) Preparations for each year's contest typically begin at the conclusion of the previous year's contest, with the head of delegation of the winning country receiving a welcome package of information related to hosting the contest at the winner's press conference. Eurovision is a non-profit event, and financing is typically achieved through a fee from each participating broadcaster, contributions from the host broadcaster and the host city, and commercial revenues from sponsorships, ticket sales, televoting, and merchandise.

The host broadcaster will subsequently select a host city, typically a national or regional capital city, which must meet certain criteria set out in the contest's rules. The host venue must be able to accommodate at least 10,000 spectators, a press centre for 1,500 journalists, should be within easy reach of an international airport and with hotel accommodation available for at least 2,000 delegates, journalists, and spectators. A variety of different venues have been used, from small theatres and television studios to large arenas and stadiums. The largest host venue is Parken Stadium in Copenhagen, which was attended by almost 38,000 spectators in 2001. With a population of 1,500 at the time of the 1993 contest, Millstreet, Ireland, remains the smallest hosting settlement, although its Green Glens Arena is capable of hosting up to 8,000 spectators.

Unlike the Olympic Games or FIFA World Cup, whose host venues are announced several years in advance, there is usually no purpose-built infrastructure whose construction is justified with the needs of hosting the Eurovision Song Contest. However, the 2012 edition, hosted in Baku, Azerbaijan, was held at Baku Crystal Hall, a venue that had not existed when Azerbaijan won the previous year. Every other edition has been held in pre-existing venues, but renovations or modifications have sometimes been undertaken in the year prior which are justified with the needs of the contest.

=== Eurovision logo and theme ===
2004–2014 logo
2015–2025 logo

Until 2004, each edition of the contest used its own logo and visual identity as determined by the respective host broadcaster. To create a consistent visual identity, the EBU introduced a generic logo ahead of the 2004 contest. This is typically accompanied by a unique theme artwork designed for each individual contest by the host broadcaster, with the flag of the host country placed prominently in the centre of the Eurovision heart. The original logo was designed by the London-based agency JM International, and received revamps in 2014 by the Amsterdam-based Cityzen Agency for the contest's 60th edition, and in 2025 by the Sheffield-based studio Pals for the 70th edition.

An individual theme is utilised by contest producers when constructing the visual identity of each edition of the contest, including the stage design, the opening and interval acts, and the "postcards". The short video postcards are interspersed between the entries and were first introduced in 1970, initially as an attempt to "bulk up" the contest after a number of countries decided not to compete, but has since become a regular part of the show and usually highlight the host country and introduce the competing acts. A unique slogan for each edition, first introduced in 2002, was also an integral part of each contest's visual identity, which was replaced by a permanent slogan from 2024 onwards. The permanent slogan, "United by Music", had previously served as the slogan for the 2023 contest before being retained for all future editions as part of the contest's brand strategy. From 2026, a design element named the "Chameleon Heart" is intended to serve as an additional generic symbol, reflecting the host nation's identity, a performer's individuality, or a particular theme.

=== Preparations ===
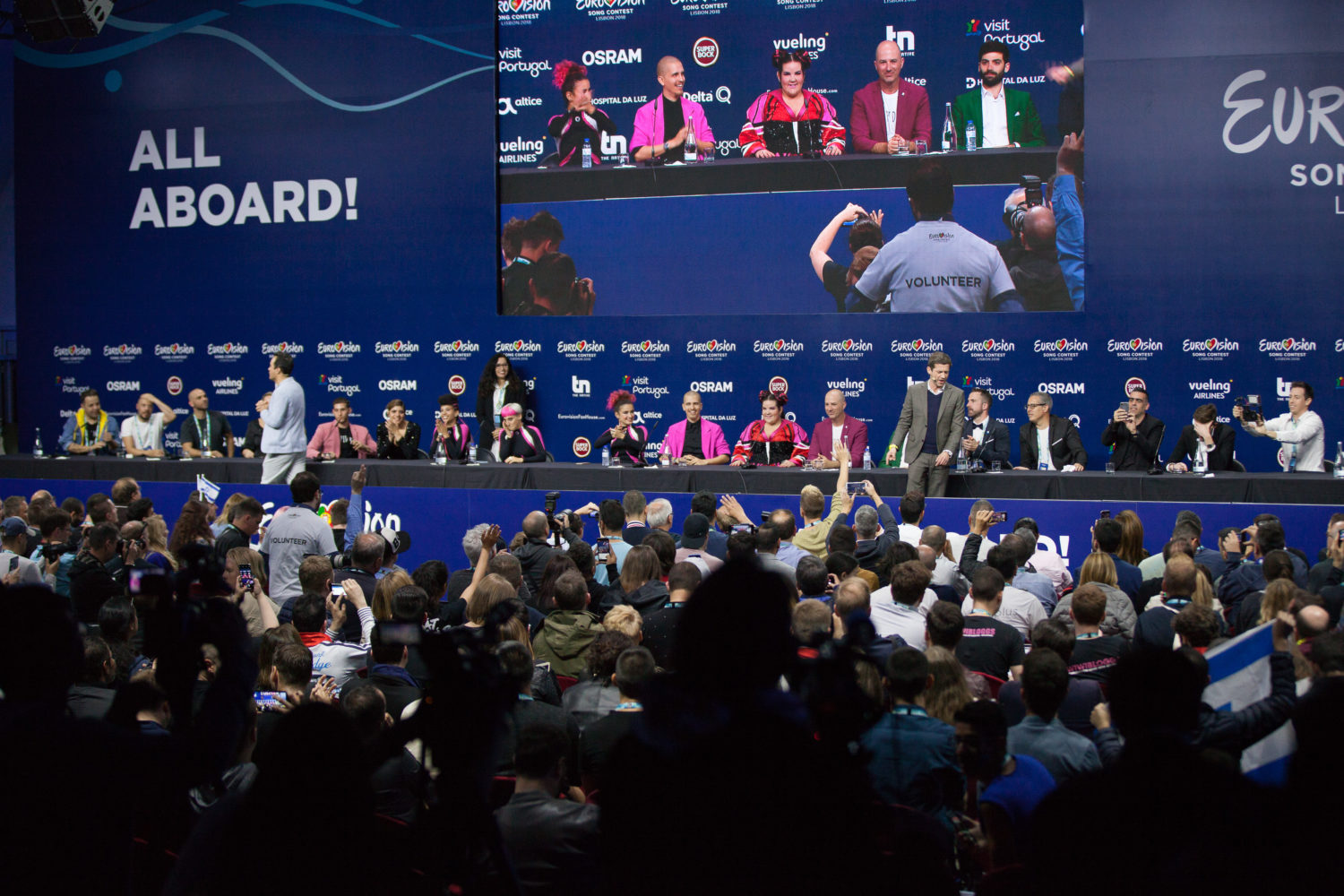
Press conference with the Israeli delegation following its win at the 2018 contest

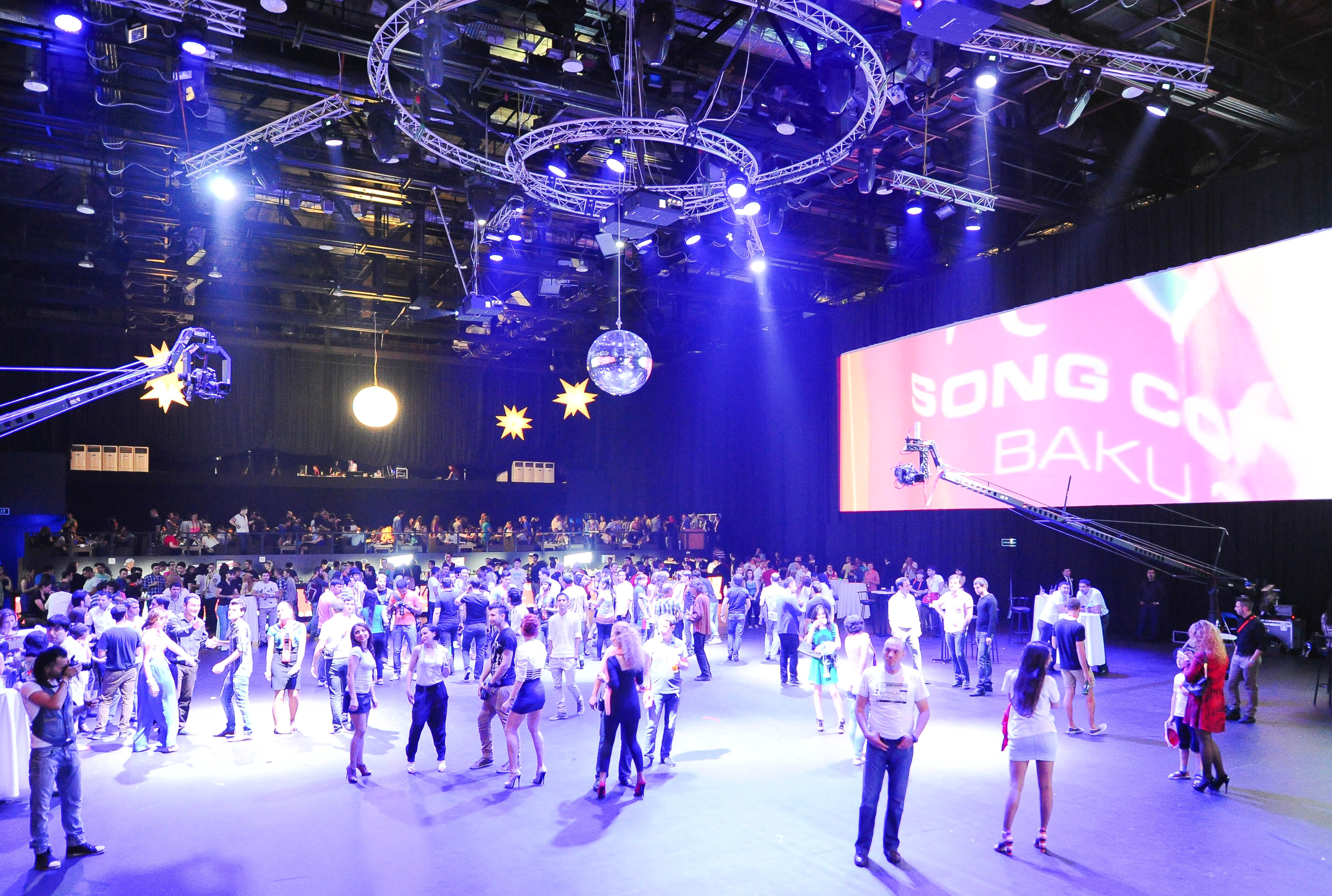
The EuroClub at the 2012 contest in Baku, Azerbaijan

Preparations in the host venue typically begin approximately six weeks before the final, to accommodate building works and technical rehearsals before the arrival of the competing artists. Delegations will typically arrive in the host city two to three weeks before the live show, and each participating broadcaster appoints a head of delegation, responsible for coordinating the movements of their delegation and being their representative to the EBU. Members of each country's delegation include performers, composers, lyricists, a Head of Press, and—in the years where a live orchestra was present—a conductor. Present if desired is a commentator, who provides commentary of the event for their radio and/or television feed in their own language in dedicated booths situated around the back of the arena behind the audience.

Each delegation conducts two individual rehearsals behind closed doors, the first for 30 minutes and the second for 20 minutes. Individual rehearsals for the semi-finalists commence the week before the live shows, with countries typically rehearsing in the order in which they will perform during the contest; rehearsals for the host country and the "Big Five" automatic finalists are held towards the end of the week. Following rehearsals, delegations meet with the show's production team to review footage of the rehearsal and raise any special requirements or changes. "Meet and greet" sessions with accredited fans and press are held during these rehearsal weeks. Each live show is preceded by three dress rehearsals, where the whole show is run in the same way as it will be presented on TV. The second dress rehearsal, alternatively called the "jury show" or "evening preview show" and held the night before the broadcast, is used as a recorded back-up in case of technological failure, and performances during this show are used by the professional jury in each country to determine their votes. Until 2025, the delegations from the qualifying countries in each semi-final attended a qualifiers' press conference after their respective semi-final. The winning delegation attends a winners' press conference following the final.

A welcome reception is typically held at a venue in the host city on the Sunday preceding the live shows, which includes a red carpet ceremony for all the participating countries and is usually broadcast online. Accredited delegates, press and fans have access to an official nightclub, the "EuroClub", and some delegations will hold their own parties. The "Eurovision Village" is an official fan zone open to the public free of charge, with live performances by the contest's artists and screenings of the live shows on big screens.

== Rules ==
The contest is organised annually by the European Broadcasting Union (EBU), together with the host broadcaster in co-production with all the participating broadcasters. The event is overseen by an executive supervisor appointed by the EBU, and monitored by the reference group which represents all participating broadcasters, who are each represented by a head of delegation. The last person to hold the role of the executive supervisor was Martin Österdahl, who took over from Jon Ola Sand in May 2020 and served until June 2025. Since then, this role has been split into two new ones: ESC director, held by Martin Green since October 2024, and ESC executive producer, held by Gert Kark since October 2025. A detailed set of rules is written by the EBU for each contest and approved by the reference group. These rules have changed over time, and typically outline, among other points, the eligibility of the competing songs, the format of the contest, and the voting system to be used to determine the winner and how the results will be presented.

=== Song eligibility and languages ===
All competing songs must have a duration of three minutes or less. This rule applies only to the version performed during the live shows. In order to be considered eligible, competing songs in a given year's contest must not have been released commercially before the first day of September of the previous year. All competing entries must include vocals and lyrics of some kind; a cappella songs and purely instrumental pieces are not allowed. Competing entries may be performed in any language, be that natural or constructed, and participating broadcasters are free to decide the language in which their entry may be performed.

Rules specifying in which language a song may be performed have changed over time. No restrictions were originally enacted when the contest was first founded; however, following criticism over the 1965 Swedish entry being performed in English, a new rule was introduced for the 1966 contest restricting songs to be performed only in an official language of the country it represented. This rule was first abolished in 1973, and subsequently reinstated for most countries in 1977, with only Belgium and Germany permitted freedom of language as their selection processes for that year's contest had already commenced. The language rule was once again abolished ahead of the 1999 contest.

There is no restriction on the national origin, country of residence or age of the songwriter(s). Furthermore, unlike performers who may only represent one country in any given year, songwriters are free to enter multiple songs in a single year sung by different acts. For example, the entries of Germany and Luxembourg in 1980 were either written or co-written by Ralph Siegel, who was involved in some form in the writing of dozens of entries throughout his 40-year-long career, both advancing to the final and failing to make it past the national selection, including "Ein bißchen Frieden", the winning entry for Germany in 1982.

=== Artist eligibility and performances ===
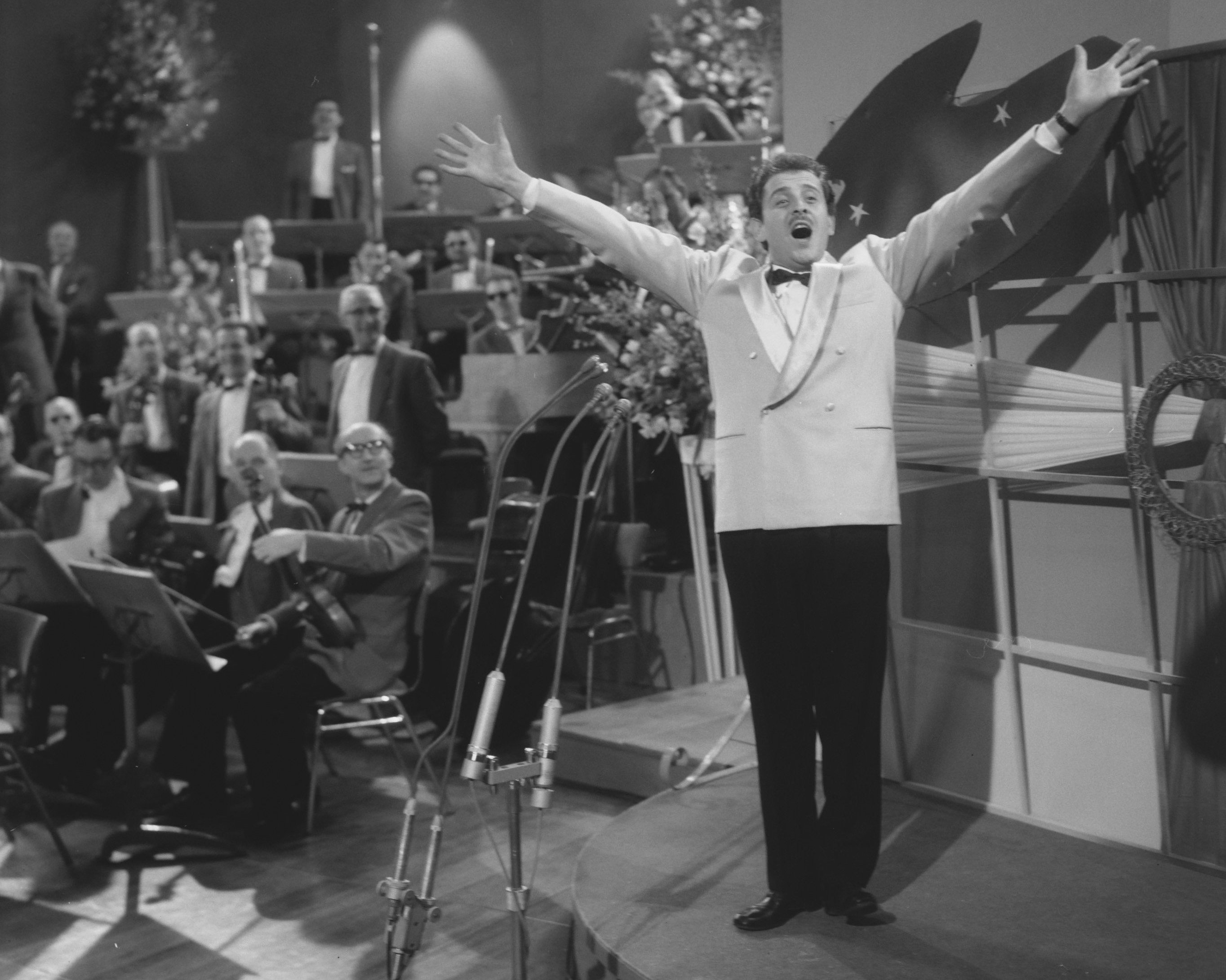
The orchestra was an integral part of the contest until 1998 (Domenico Modugno performing at the 1958 contest).

The rules for the first contest specified that only solo performers were permitted to enter; this criterion was changed the following year to permit duos to compete, and groups were subsequently permitted for the first time in 1971. Currently the number of people permitted on stage during competing performances is limited to a maximum of six, and no live animals are allowed. Since 1990, all contestants are required to be aged 16 or over on the day of the live show in which they perform; this will be changed to 18 starting in 2027. Sandra Kim, the winner for Belgium in 1986 at the age of 13, shall remain the contest's youngest winner while this rule remains in place. There is no limit on the nationality or country of birth of the competing artists, and participating broadcasters are free to select an artist from any country; several winning artists have subsequently held a different nationality or were born in a different country to that which they represented. No performer may compete for more than one country in a given year. There is no restriction regarding performers who have participated in past events competing again – whether for the same country or a different one. It is even possible for a winning performer to try and defend their title in the next edition, as happened when Lys Assia competed for Switzerland in 1957 after winning in 1956, or when Lena competed for Germany in 2011 after winning in 2010. However, in the history of the contest only two individuals have won more than once as a performer – Johnny Logan for Ireland in 1980 and 1987, and Loreen for Sweden in 2012 and 2023.

From 1956 to 1998, a live orchestra formed an integral part of the contest, providing accompaniment to all the acts performing. Pre-recorded backing tracks were first allowed for competing acts in 1973, but any pre-recorded instruments were required to be seen being "performed" on stage. In 1997, all instrumental music was allowed to be pre-recorded, although the host country was still required to provide an orchestra. In 1999, the rules were changed again, making the orchestra an optional requirement; the host broadcaster of that year's contest, the Israel Broadcasting Authority (IBA), subsequently decided not to provide an orchestra, resulting in all acts using backing tracks for the first time.

The main vocals of competing songs must be performed live during the contest. Previously live backing vocals were also required; since 2021 these may optionally be pre-recorded – this change has been implemented in an effort to introduce flexibility following the cancellation of the 2020 edition and to facilitate modernisation.

=== Running order ===
Since 2013, the order in which the competing countries perform has been determined by the contest's producers, and submitted to the executive supervisor and reference group for approval before public announcement. This was changed from a random draw used in previous years in order to provide a better experience for television viewers and ensure all entries stand out by avoiding instances where songs of a similar style or tempo are performed in sequence.

Since the creation of a second semi-final in 2008, a semi-final allocation draw is held each year. Countries are placed into pots based on their geographical location and voting history in recent contests, and are assigned to compete in one of the two semi-finals through a random draw. Countries are then randomly assigned to compete in either the first or second half of their respective semi-final, and once all competing songs have been selected the producers then determine the running order for the semi-finals. The automatic qualifiers are assigned at random to a semi-final for the purposes of voting rights.

Semi-final qualifiers make a draw at random during the qualifiers' press conference to determine whether they will perform during the first, second half, or a producer-determined position in the final, while the automatic finalists randomly draw their competing half or producer-determined position in the run-up to the final, except for the host country, whose exact performance position is determined in a separate draw. The running order for the final is then decided following the second semi-final by the producers. The running orders are decided with the competing songs' musical qualities, stage performance, prop, lighting set-up, and other production considerations taken into account.

=== Voting ===
The electronic scoreboard used at the 2004 contest, with Johnny Logan announcing the votes from Ireland

The results of the contest are determined by a positional voting system, with its most recent version implemented in 2026. Each country awards two sets of 1–8, 10, and 12 points to the ten favourite songs as voted for by its general public and assembled jury, with the most preferred song receiving 12 points. The points from the viewing public are based on the votes cast via telephone, SMS, or the official Eurovision app, while the points from the jury are awarded by a panel comprising seven music professionals. A Rest of the World vote was introduced in 2023, allowing viewers in non-participating countries to vote via an online platform, with these votes aggregated and awarded as one set of points from an "extra country" for the overall public vote. This system is a modification of that used since 1975, when the "12 points" system was first introduced but with one set of points per country. National juries and the public in each country are not allowed to vote for their own country, a rule first introduced in 1957.

Historically, each country's points were determined by a jury, consisting at various times of members of the public, music professionals, or both in combination. With advances in telecommunication technology, televoting was first introduced to the contest in 1997 on a trial basis, with broadcasters in five countries allowing the viewing public to determine their votes for the first time. From 1998, televoting was extended to almost all competing countries, and subsequently became mandatory from 2004. A jury was reintroduced for the final in 2009, with each country's points comprising both the votes of the jury and public in an equal split; this mix of jury and public voting was expanded into the semi-finals from 2010, and was used until 2023, when full public voting was reintroduced to determine the results of the semi-finals. The mix of jury and public voting continues to be used in the final, and returned to the semi-finals in 2026.

Should two or more countries finish with the same number of points, a tie-break procedure is employed to determine the final placings. As of 2016, a combined national televoting and jury result is calculated for each country, and the country which has obtained more points from the public voting following this calculation is deemed to have placed higher.

==== Presentation of the votes ====
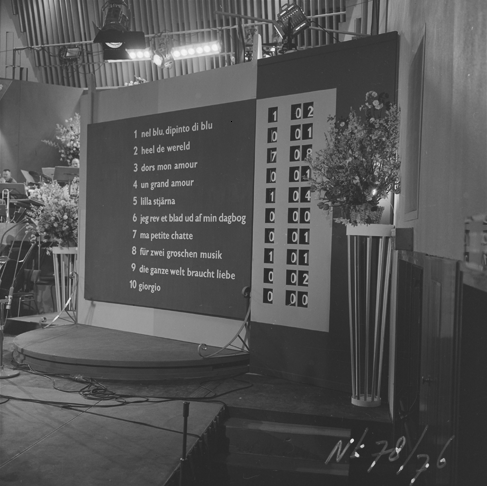
The scoreboard at the 1958 contest

Since 1957, each country's votes have been announced during a special voting segment as part of the contest's broadcast, with a selected spokesperson assigned to announce the results of their country's vote. This spokesperson is typically well known in their country; previous spokespersons have included former Eurovision artists and presenters. Historically, the announcements were made through telephone lines from the countries of origin, with live television feeds employed for the first time in 1994, allowing the venue audience and home viewers to see the spokespersons.

Scoring is done by both a national jury and a national televote. Each country's jury votes are consecutively added to the totals scoreboard as they are called upon by the contest presenter(s). The scoreboard was historically placed at the side of the stage and updated manually as each country gave their votes; in 1988 a computer graphics scoreboard was introduced. The jury points from 1–8 and 10 are displayed on screen and added automatically to the scoreboard, then the country's spokesperson announces which country will receive the 12 points. Once jury points from all countries have been announced, the presenter(s) announce the total public points received for each finalist, with the votes for each country being consolidated and announced as a single value. Since 2019, the public points have been revealed in ascending order based on the jury vote, with the country that received the fewest points from the jury being the first to receive their public points. A full breakdown of the results across all shows is published on the official Eurovision website after the final, including each country's televoting ranking and the votes of its jury and individual jury members. Each country's individual televoting points in the final are typically displayed on-screen by that country's broadcaster following the announcement of the winner.

=== Broadcasting ===
Participating broadcasters are required to air live the semi-final in which they compete, or in the case of the automatic finalists the semi-final in which they are required to vote, and the final, in its entirety; this includes all competing songs, the voting recap containing short clips of the performances, the voting procedure or semi-final qualification reveal, and the reprise of the winning song in the final. Since 1999, broadcasters who wished to do so were given the opportunity to provide advertising during short, non-essential hiatuses in the show's schedule. In exceptional circumstances, such as due to developing emergency situations, participating broadcasters may delay or postpone broadcast of the event. Should a broadcaster fail to air a show as expected in any other scenario they may be subject to sanctions by the EBU. Many broadcasters that are unable to compete have aired the contest in their markets.

As broadcasters join and leave the Eurovision feed transmitted by the EBU, the EBU/Eurovision network logo ident (not to be confused with the logo of the song contest itself) is displayed. The accompanying theme tune is the Prelude (Marche en rondeau) to Marc-Antoine Charpentier's "Te Deum". Originally, the same logo was used for both the Eurovision network and the EBU, but they now have two different logos; the latest Eurovision network logo was introduced in 2026, and when the ident is transmitted at the start and end of programmes it is this Eurovision network logo that appears.

The EBU now holds the recordings of all but two editions of the contest in its archives, following a project initiated in 2011 to collate footage and related materials of all editions ahead of the event's 60th edition in 2015. The only footage available of the 1956 contest is a Kinescope recording of Lys Assia's reprise of her winning song. No full recording of the 1964 contest is known to exist, with conflicting reports of the fate of any copies that may have survived. Audio recordings of both contests do, however, exist, and some short pieces of footage from both events have survived. Until 2004, the host broadcaster owned the copyright of the contest that they produced, with the EBU owning the copyright of all subsequent editions.

== Expansion of the contest ==
Participating countries in 1992; Yugoslavia (in red) participated for the final time

Participating countries in 1994

Changes in Europe in the 1980s and 1990s impacted the contest, as Yugoslavia ceased participating under one name and new countries in Central and Eastern Europe started competing.

From the original seven countries which entered the first contest in 1956, the number of competing countries has steadily grown over time. 18 countries participated in the contest's tenth edition in 1965, and by 1990, 22 countries were regularly competing each year.

Besides slight modifications to the voting system and other contest rules, no fundamental changes to the contest's format were introduced until the events in Europe in the late 1980s and early 1990s led to the breakup of Yugoslavia, with the subsequent admission into the EBU of the broadcasters of the countries that emerged from the breakup, and to the merger in 1993 of the EBU with its Eastern European counterpart, the International Radio and Television Organisation (OIRT), which further expanded the number of broadcasters by including those from countries of the former Eastern Bloc. These events impacted the contest as they expanded the number of broadcasters eligible to participate with those from new countries.

=== Pre-selections and relegation ===
Broadcasters from 29 countries registered to take part in the 1993 contest, a figure the EBU considered unable to fit reasonably into a single television show. A pre-selection method was subsequently introduced for the first time in order to reduce the number of competing entries, with the seven new countries from Central and Eastern Europe participating in Kvalifikacija za Millstreet, held in Ljubljana, Slovenia, one month before the event. Following a vote amongst the seven competing countries, Bosnia and Herzegovina, Croatia and Slovenia were chosen to head to the contest in Millstreet, Ireland, whilst Estonia, Hungary, Romania and Slovakia were forced to wait another year before being allowed to compete for the first time. A new relegation system was introduced for entry into the 1994 contest, with the lowest-placed countries being forced to sit out the following year's event to be replaced by countries which had not competed in the previous contest. The bottom seven countries in 1993 were required to miss the following year's contest, and were replaced by the four unsuccessful countries in Kvalifikacija za Millstreet and new entries from Lithuania, Poland, and Russia.

This system was used again in 1994 for qualification for the 1995 contest, but a new system was introduced for the 1996 contest, when an audio-only qualification round was held in the months before the contest in Oslo, Norway; this system was primarily introduced in an attempt to appease Germany, one of Eurovision's biggest markets and financial contributors, which would have otherwise been relegated under the previous system. 29 countries competed for 22 places in the main contest alongside the automatically qualified Norwegian hosts. However, Germany would ultimately still miss out, and joined Hungary, Romania, Russia, Denmark, Israel, and Macedonia as one of the seven countries to be absent from the Oslo contest. As of 2025 this is the only contest Germany has not participated in. For the 1997 contest, a similar relegation system to that used between 1993 and 1995 was introduced, with each country's average scores in the preceding five contests being used as a measure to determine which countries would be relegated. This was subsequently changed again in 2001, back to the same system used between 1993 and 1995 where only the results from that year's contest would count towards relegation.

=== The "Big" countries ===
In 1999, an exemption from relegation was introduced for France, Germany, Spain, and the United Kingdom, giving them an automatic right to compete in the 2000 contest and in all subsequent editions. This group, as the highest-paying EBU members which significantly fund the contest each year, subsequently became known as the "Big Four" countries. This group was expanded in 2011 when Italy began competing again, becoming the "Big Five". The "Big Four" were originally brought in to ensure that the financial contributions of the contest's biggest financial backers would not be missed, as the production of the 1996 contest was significantly compromised by the absence of Germany. Since the introduction of the semi-finals in 2004, the "Big Five" countries have now automatically qualified for the final alongside the host country, and have not been required to compete in the semi-finals. Spain opted not to participate in the 2026 contest as part of a larger boycott against Israel's participation in the context of the Gaza war, thereby reducing the number of "Big" countries back to four.

There remains debate on whether this status prejudices the countries' results, based on reported antipathy over their automatic qualification and the potential disadvantage of having spent less time on stage through not competing in the semi-finals; however, this status appears to be more complex given that the results of the "Big" countries can vary widely. This status has caused consternation from other competing countries, and was cited, among other aspects, as a reason why Turkey had ceased participating after 2012. In response to the criticism on less stage time from these countries, since 2024, the entries from the "Big" countries, along with the host country, have been performed live in one of the two semi-finals outside of the competition for qualification, a change which was announced as giving these countries "a fairer playing field" in the final.

=== Introduction of semi-finals ===
Qualification rates per country (2004–2026; automatic qualifications not included)

An influx of new broadcasters applying for the 2003 contest resulted in the introduction of a semi-final from 2004, with the contest becoming a two-day event. The top 10 countries in each year's final would qualify automatically to the following year's final, alongside the "Big Four", meaning all other countries would compete in the semi-final to compete for 10 qualification spots. The 2004 contest saw a record 36 countries competing, with new entries from Albania, Andorra, Belarus, and Serbia and Montenegro and the return of previously relegated countries. The format of this semi-final remained similar to the final proper, taking place a few days before the final; following the performances and the voting window, the names of the 10 countries with the highest number of points, which would therefore qualify for the final, were announced at the end of the show, revealed in a random order by the contest's presenters.

The single semi-final continued to be held between 2005 and 2007; however, with 42 countries competing in the 2007 contest, that year's semi-final had 28 entries competing for 10 spots in the final. Following criticism over the mainly Central and Eastern European qualifiers at the 2007 event and the poor performance of entries from Western European countries, a second semi-final was subsequently introduced for the 2008 contest, with all countries now competing in one of the two semi-finals, with only the host country and the "Big" countries qualifying automatically. 10 qualification spots would be available in each of the semi-finals, and a new system to split the competing countries between the two semi-finals was introduced based on their geographic location and previous voting patterns, in an attempt to reduce the impact of bloc voting and to make the outcome less predictable.

== Entries and participants ==
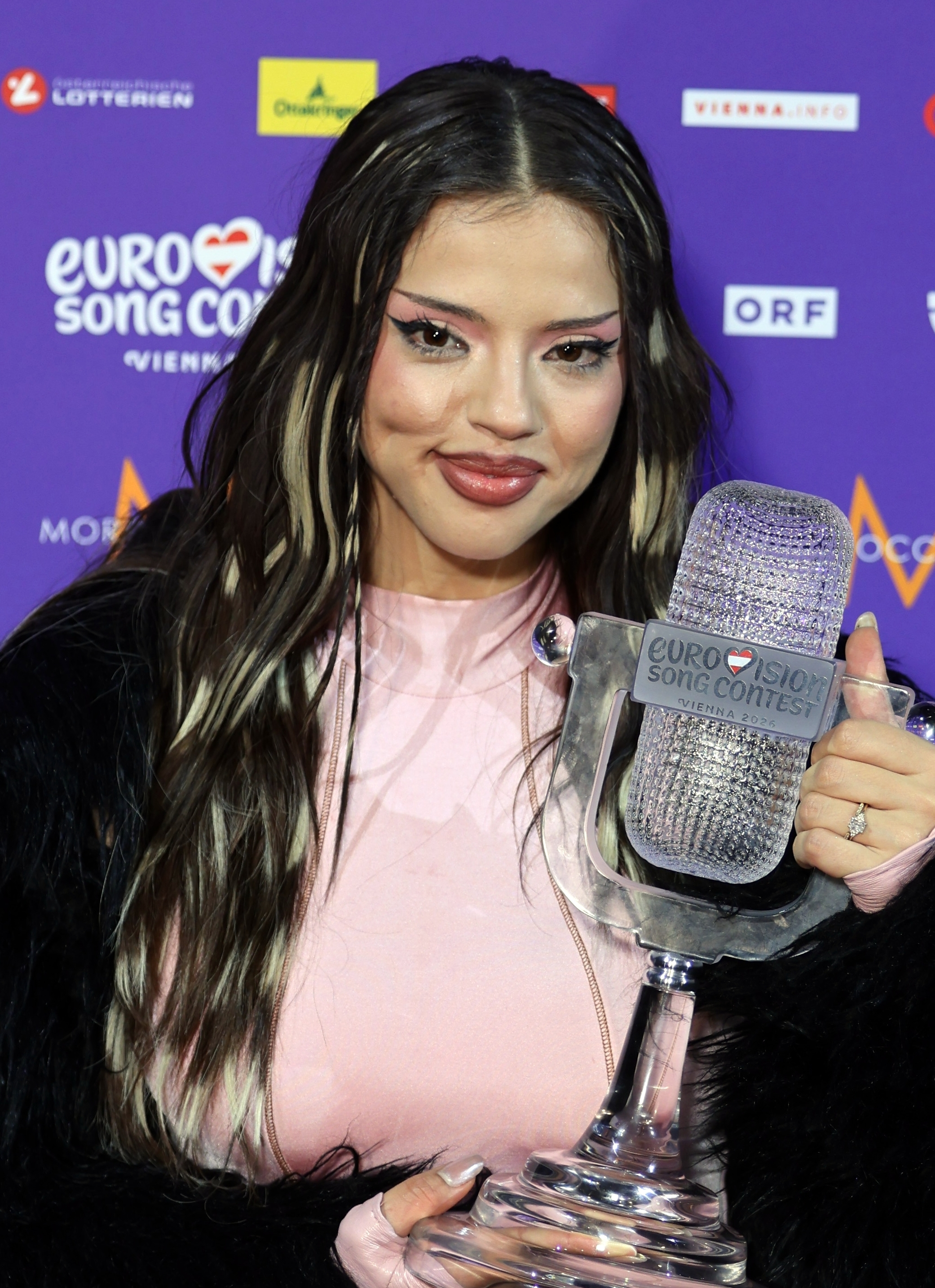
Bulgarian singer Dara is the most recent winner of the contest.

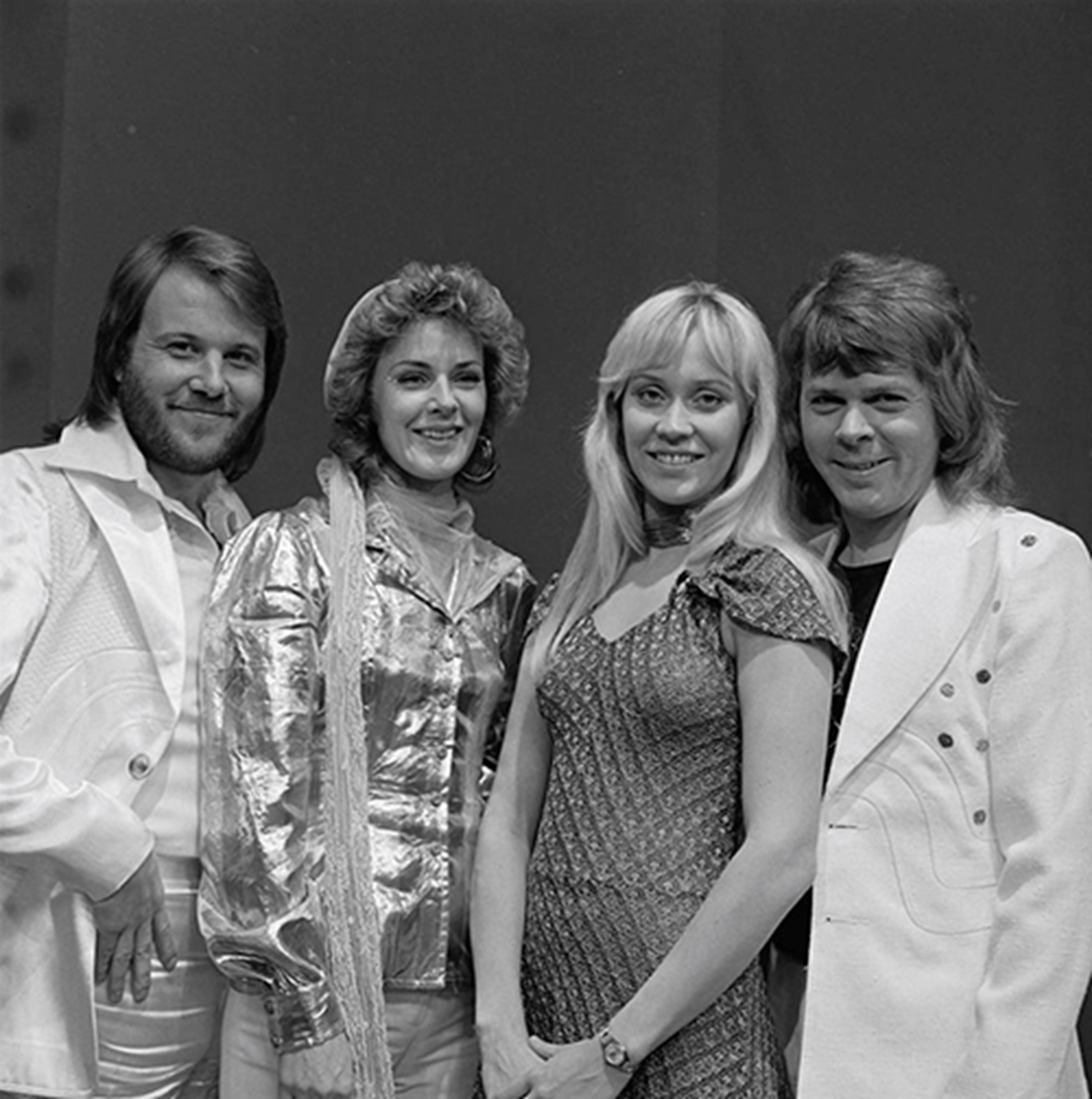
After winning the 1974 contest with the song "Waterloo", the Swedish pop group ABBA became one of the most commercially successful acts in the history of pop music.

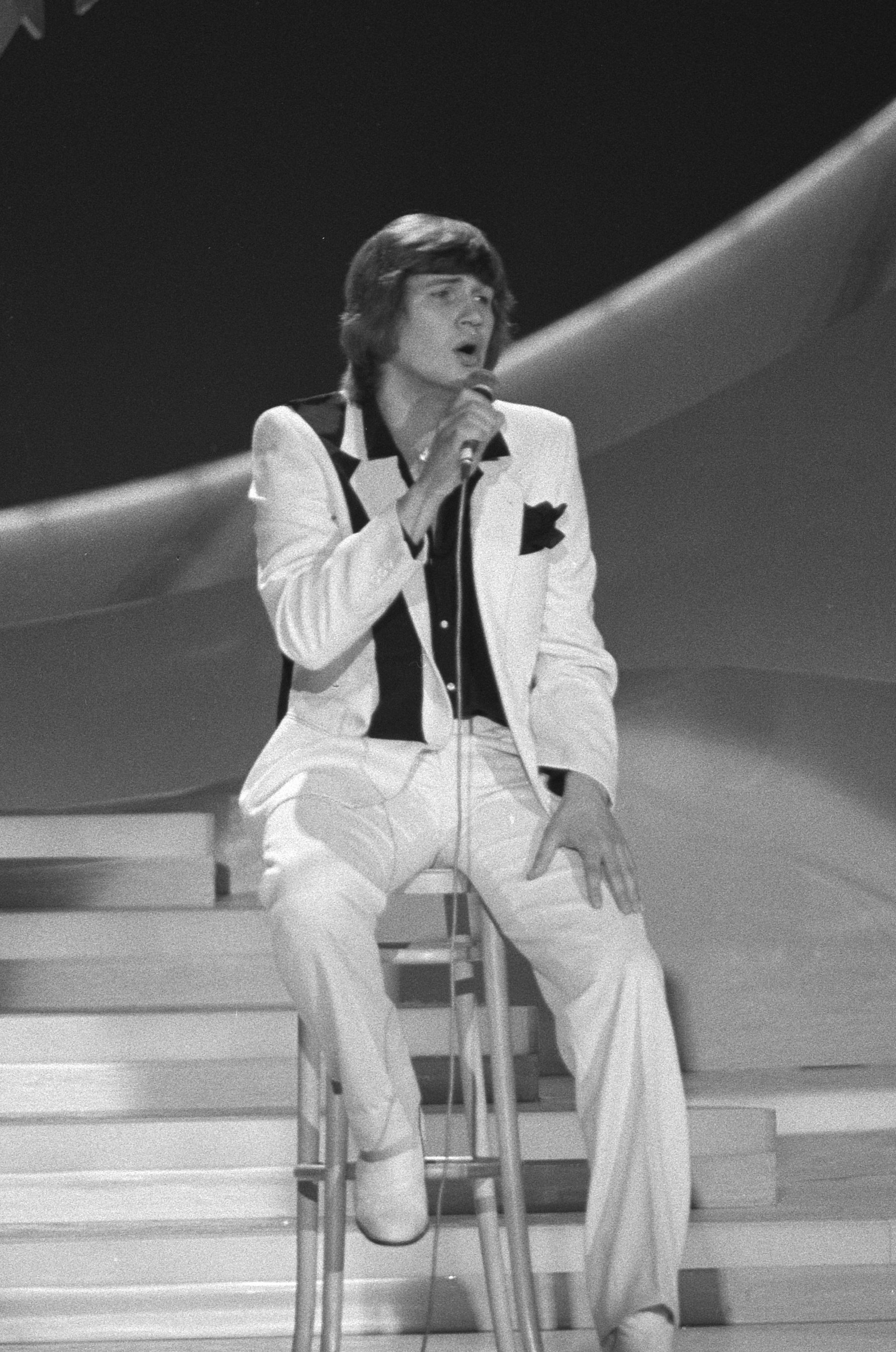
Johnny Logan is the first performer to have won the contest twice, in 1980 (pictured) and 1987; he also wrote the winning song in 1992.

The contest has been used as a launching point for artists who went on to achieve worldwide fame, and several of the world's best-selling artists are counted among past Eurovision Song Contest participants and winning artists. ABBA, the winners for Sweden in 1974, have sold an estimated 380 million albums and singles since their contest win brought them to worldwide attention, with their winning song "Waterloo" selling over five million records. Céline Dion's win for Switzerland in 1988 helped launch her international career, particularly in the Anglophone market, and she would go on to sell an estimated 200 million records worldwide. Julio Iglesias was relatively unknown when he represented Spain in 1970 and placed fourth, but worldwide success followed his Eurovision appearance, with an estimated 100 million records sold during his career. Australian-British singer Olivia Newton-John represented the United Kingdom in 1974, placing fourth, but went on to sell an estimated 100 million records, win four Grammy Awards, and star in the critically and commercially successful musical film Grease.

A number of performers have competed in the contest after having already achieved considerable success. These include winning artists Lulu, Toto Cutugno, and Katrina and the Waves, and other acts that competed such as Nana Mouskouri, Cliff Richard, Baccara, Umberto Tozzi, Plastic Bertrand, t.A.T.u., Las Ketchup, Patricia Kaas, Engelbert Humperdinck, Bonnie Tyler, Gabry Ponte, Flo Rida, and Melody. Many well-known composers and lyricists have penned entries of varying success over the years, including Serge Gainsbourg, Goran Bregović, Diane Warren, Andrew Lloyd Webber, Pete Waterman, and Tony Iommi, as well as producers Timbaland and Guy-Manuel de Homem-Christo.

Past participants have contributed to other fields in addition to their music careers. The Netherlands' Annie M.G. Schmidt, lyricist of the first entry performed at Eurovision, has gained a worldwide reputation for her stories and earned the Hans Christian Andersen Award for children's literature. French "yé-yé girls" Françoise Hardy and contest winner France Gall are household names of 1960s pop culture, with Hardy also being a pioneer of street style fashion trends and an inspiration for the global youthquake movement. Figures who carved a career in politics and gained international acclaim for humanitarian achievements include contest winner Dana as a two-time Irish presidential candidate and Member of the European Parliament (MEP); Nana Mouskouri as Greek MEP and a UNICEF international goodwill ambassador; contest winner Ruslana as member of Verkhovna Rada, Ukraine's parliament and a figure of the Orange Revolution and Euromaidan protests, who gained global honours for leadership and courage; and North Macedonia's Esma Redžepova as member of political parties and a two-time Nobel Peace Prize nominee.

Competing songs have occasionally gone on to become successes for their original performers and other artists, and some of the best-selling singles globally received their first international performances at Eurovision. "Save Your Kisses for Me", the winning song for the United Kingdom in 1976 performed by Brotherhood of Man, went on to sell over six million singles, more than any other winning song. "Nel blu, dipinto di blu", also known as "Volare", third-placed song for Italy in 1958 performed by Domenico Modugno, is the only Eurovision entry to win a Grammy Award. It was the first Grammy winner for both Record of the Year and Song of the Year and it has since been recorded by various artists, topped the Billboard Hot 100 in the United States and achieved combined sales of over 22 million copies worldwide. "Eres tú", runner-up for Spain in 1973 performed by Mocedades, became the first Spanish-language song to reach the top 10 of the Billboard Hot 100, and the Grammy-nominated "Ooh Aah... Just a Little Bit", which came eighth for the United Kingdom in 1996 performed by Gina G, sold 790,000 records and achieved success across Europe and the US, reaching number 1 on the UK Singles Chart and peaking at number 12 on the Billboard Hot 100.

The turn of the century has also seen numerous competing songs becoming successes. "Euphoria", Loreen's winning song for Sweden in 2012, achieved Europe-wide success, reaching number one in several countries and by 2014 had become the most downloaded Eurovision song to date. The video for "Occidentali's Karma" by Francesco Gabbani, which placed sixth for Italy in 2017, became the first Eurovision song to reach more than 200 million views on YouTube, while "Soldi" by Mahmood, the runner-up for Italy in 2019, was the most-streamed Eurovision song on Spotify until it was overtaken by that year's winner for the Netherlands, "Arcade" by Duncan Laurence, following viral success on TikTok in late 2020 and early 2021; "Arcade" later became the first Eurovision song since "Ooh Aah... Just a Little Bit" and the first Eurovision winning song since "Save Your Kisses for Me" to chart on the Billboard Hot 100, eventually peaking at number 30. The 2021 contest saw the next major breakthrough success from Eurovision, with Måneskin, that year's winners for Italy with "Zitti e buoni", attracting worldwide attention across their repertoire immediately following their victory.

Johnny Logan was the first artist to have won multiple contests as a performer, winning for Ireland in 1980 with "What's Another Year", written by Shay Healy, and in 1987 with the self-penned "Hold Me Now". Logan was also the winning songwriter for Ireland in 1992 with "Why Me?" performed by Linda Martin, and has therefore achieved three contest victories as either a performer or writer. Four further songwriters have each written two contest-winning songs: Willy van Hemert, Yves Dessca, Rolf Løvland, and Brendan Graham. Following their introduction in 2004, Alexander Rybak became the first artist to win multiple Eurovision semi-finals, finishing in first at the second semi-finals for Norway in 2009 and 2018; he remains the only entrant to have done so to date.

=== Winners ===
Each country's win record in the contest as of 2026

73 songs from 28 countries have won the Eurovision Song Contest as of 2026. Ireland and Sweden have recorded the most wins with seven each, followed by France, Luxembourg, the United Kingdom, and the Netherlands with five each. Of the 52 countries to have taken part, 24 (Note: Serbia and Montenegro participated twice (in 2004 and 2005) but did not win. However, this country ceased to exist since.) have yet to win. Only one contest has featured multiple winners in a single year: in 1969, four entries (Note: Namely "Un jour, un enfant" performed by Frida Boccara for France, "Vivo cantando" by Salomé for Spain, "De troubadour" by Lenny Kuhr for the Netherlands, and "Boom Bang-a-Bang" by Lulu for the United Kingdom.) finished the contest with an equal number of points and were all declared winners, as allowed by the rules at the time. A majority of winning songs have been performed in English, particularly since the rule requiring native-language songs was abolished in 1999: since then, only seven winning songs have been performed either fully or partially in a language other than English.

Only one country has won the contest on its first appearance: Serbia won in 2007 with its first participation as an independent country; (Note: Entries from Serbia had previously participated representing now-defunct countries Yugoslavia and Serbia and Montenegro.) since Switzerland had won the inaugural contest in 1956 with its second entry in that contest. Other countries have had relatively short waits before winning their first contest, with Ukraine winning on its second appearance in 2004 and Latvia winning with its third entry in 2002. Conversely, some countries have had considerable gaps between their debut entry and their first win: Greece recorded its first win in 2005, 31 years after its first appearance, while Finland ended a 45-year losing streak in 2006. Portugal holds the record for the most contest entries prior to its first win in 2017, coming 53 years after it first competed. Other countries have also had large gaps between their winning entries: Switzerland went 32 years between winning in 1956 and 1988, and a further 36 years between then and winning in 2024; Denmark had a 37-year gap between its wins in 1963 and 2000; the Netherlands had a 44-year gap between its wins in 1975 and 2019; and Austria achieved its second win in 2014, 48 years after its first win in 1966.

The United Kingdom holds the record for runner-up placements, having finished second 16 times. Norway has finished last on a record 12 occasions, including scoring nul points four times; it shares the record for receiving this score with Austria. Countries have recorded back-to-back wins on four occasions: Spain in 1968 and 1969; Luxembourg in 1972 and 1973; Israel in 1978 and 1979; and Ireland in 1992, 1993, and 1994, becoming the first and only country to date to win three times in a row. Additionally, Ireland later won in 1996, giving it a record four wins in the span of five years.

The winning artist(s), songwriter(s), and broadcaster receive a medal or a trophy, which since 2008 has followed a standard design: a handmade trophy of sandblasted glass with painted details in the shape of a 1950s-style microphone, designed by Kjell Engman of the Swedish-based glassworks Kosta Boda. The award is typically presented by the previous year's winner; others who have handed out the award in the past include representatives from the host broadcaster or the EBU, and politicians; in 2007, the fictional character Joulupukki (the original Santa Claus in Finland) presented the award to the winner Marija Šerifović.

== Interval acts and guest appearances ==
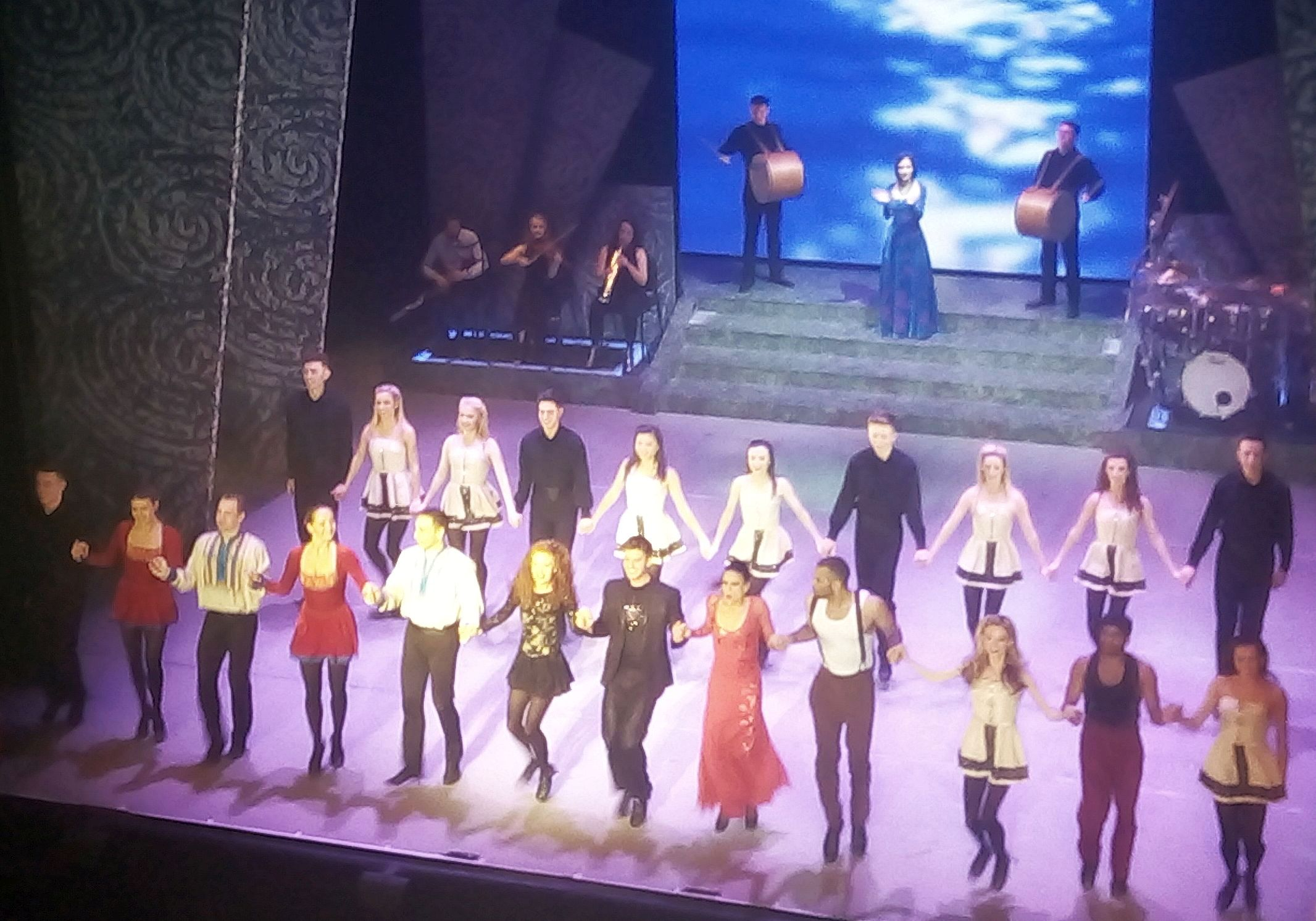
Riverdance (cast pictured at the Gaiety Theatre, Dublin in 2019) was the interval act at the 1994 contest.

Alongside the song contest and appearances from local and international personalities, performances from non-competing artists and musicians have been included since the first edition, and have become a staple of the live show. These performances have varied widely, previously featuring music, art, dance, and circus performances, and past participants are regularly invited to perform, with the reigning champion traditionally returning each year to perform the previous year's winning song.

The contest's opening performance and the main interval act, held following the competing song and before the announcement of the voting results, has become a memorable part of the contest and has included both internationally known artists and local stars. Contest organisers have previously used these performances as a way to explore their country's culture and history, such as in "4,000 Years of Greek Song" at the 2006 contest held in Greece; other performances have been more comedic in nature, featuring parody and humour, as was the case with "Love Love Peace Peace" in 2016, a humorous ode to the history and spectacle of the contest itself. Riverdance, which later became one of the most successful dance productions in the world, first began as the interval performance at the 1994 contest in Ireland; the seven-minute performance of traditional Irish music and dance was later expanded into a full stage show that has been seen by over 25 million people worldwide and provided a launchpad for its lead dancers Michael Flatley and Jean Butler.

Among other artists who have performed in a non-competitive manner are Danish Europop group Aqua in 2001, Finnish cello metal band Apocalyptica in 2007, Russian pop duo t.A.T.u. in 2009, and American entertainers Justin Timberlake and Madonna in 2016 and 2019 respectively. Other notable artists, including Charlie Rivel (1973), Cirque du Soleil (2009), Alexandrov Ensemble (2009), Vienna Boys' Choir (1967 and 2015), and Fire of Anatolia (2004), also performed on the Eurovision stage, and there have been guest appearances from well-known faces from outside the world of music, including actors, athletes, and serving astronauts and cosmonauts. Guest performances have been used as a channel in response to global events happening concurrently with the contest. The 1999 contest in Israel closed with all competing acts performing a rendition of Israel's 1979 winning song "Hallelujah" as a tribute to the victims of the Kosovo War, a dance performance entitled "The Grey People" in 2016's first semi-final was devoted to the 2015 European migrant crisis, the 2022 contest featured known anti-war songs "Fragile", "People Have the Power", and "Give Peace a Chance" in response to the Russian invasion of Ukraine that year, and an interval act in 2023's first semi-final alluded to the refugee crisis caused by the aforementioned invasion.

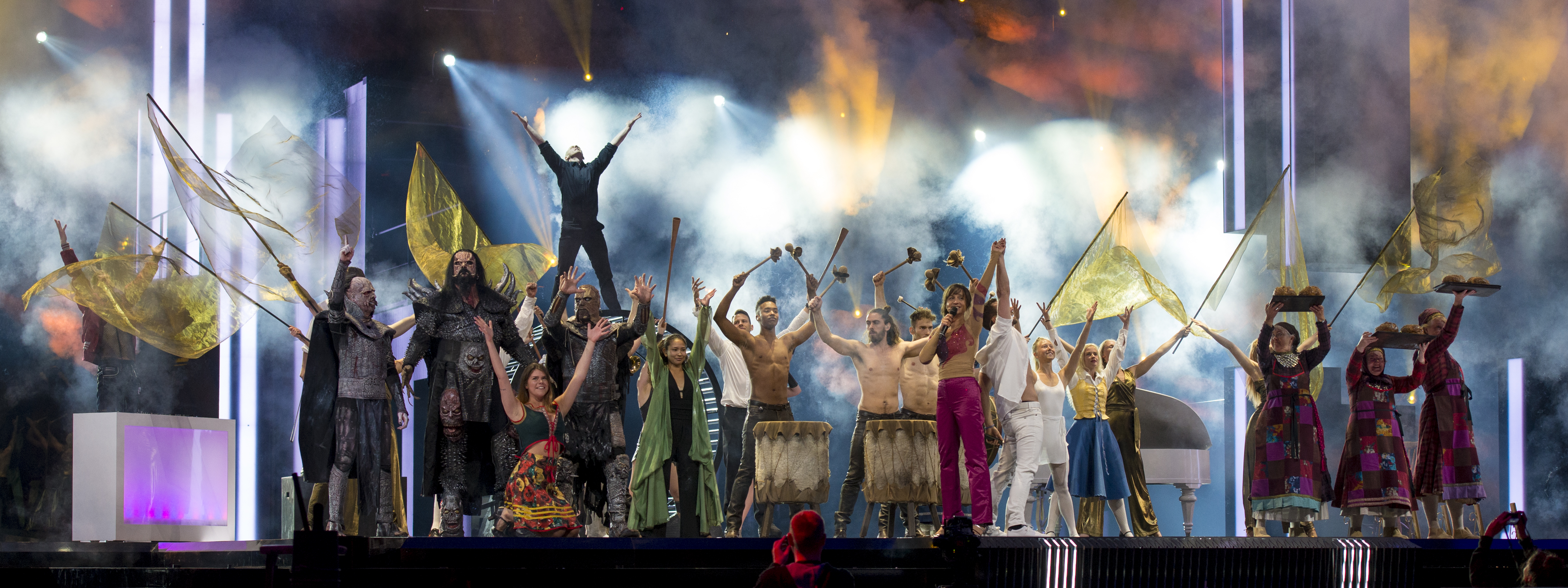
"Love Love Peace Peace" at the 2016 final, performed by presenters Petra Mede and Måns Zelmerlöw, depicted several memorable moments from Eurovision history (photo from rehearsals)

== Criticism and controversy ==
The contest has been the subject of considerable criticism regarding both its musical content and what has been reported to be a political element to the event, and several controversial moments have been witnessed over the course of its history. British historian Tony Judt wrote in 2006 that the contest in the 1970s and 1980s became "the most widely celebrated object of ridicule" on public television, because it "was so stunningly banal in conception and execution as to defy parody." Judt dismissed the artists who entered the contest as "a stream of inept performers" who would in most cases return to "the obscurity from whence they briefly emerged."

=== Musical style and presentation ===
Criticism has been levied against the musical quality of competing entries, with a perception that certain music styles seen as being presented more often than others in an attempt to appeal to as many potential voters as possible among the international audience. By the 2000s, power ballads, folk rhythms, and bubblegum pop have been considered staples of the contest, leading to allegations that the event has become formulaic. Other traits in competing entries which have regularly been mocked by media and viewers include an abundance of key changes and lyrics about love and/or peace, as well as the pronunciation of English by non-native users of the language. Given Eurovision is principally a television show, over the years competing performances have attempted to attract the viewers' attention through means other than music, and elaborate lighting displays, pyrotechnics, and extravagant on-stage theatrics and costumes having become a common sight; criticism of these tactics have been levied as being a method of distracting the viewer from the weak musical quality of some of the competing entries.

While many of these traits are ridiculed in the media and elsewhere, for others these traits are celebrated and considered an integral part of what makes the contest appealing. Although many of the competing acts each year will fall into some of the categories above, the contest has seen a diverse range of musical styles in its history, including rock, heavy metal, jazz, country, electronic, R&B, hip-hop, and avant-garde.

=== Political controversies ===
As artists and songs ultimately represent a country, the contest has seen several controversial moments where political tensions between competing countries as a result of frozen conflicts, and in some cases open warfare, are reflected in the performances and voting.

The conflict between Armenia and Azerbaijan has affected the contest on numerous occasions. Conflicts between the two countries at Eurovision escalated quickly since both countries began competing in the late 2000s, resulting in fines and disciplinary action for both countries' broadcasters over political stunts, and a forced change of title for one competing song due to allegations of political subtext. Interactions between Russia and Ukraine in the contest had originally been positive, but as political relations soured between the two countries so, too, have relations at Eurovision become more complex. Complaints were levied against the winning song for Ukraine in 2016, "1944", whose lyrics referenced the deportation of the Crimean Tatars, but which the Russian delegation claimed had a greater political meaning in light of Russia's annexation of Crimea. As Ukraine prepared to host the following year's contest, Russia's selected representative, Yuliya Samoylova, was barred from entering the country due to having previously entered Crimea illegally according to Ukrainian law. Channel One Russia eventually pulled out of the contest after offers for Samoylova to perform remotely were refused by the broadcaster, resulting in the EBU reprimanding the Public Broadcasting Company of Ukraine (UA:PBC). In the wake of the Russian invasion of Ukraine and subsequent protests from other participating countries, Russia was barred from competing in the 2022 contest, which Ukraine went on to win.

The planned entry from Georgia in 2009, "We Don't Wanna Put In", caused controversy as the lyrics appeared to criticise Vladimir Putin, in a move seen as opposition to the then-Russian prime minister in the aftermath of the Russo-Georgian War. After requests by the EBU for changes to the lyrics were refused, the Georgian Public Broadcaster (GPB) subsequently withdrew from the event. The planned entry from Belarus in 2021, "Ya nauchu tebya (I'll Teach You)", also caused controversy in the wake of demonstrations against disputed election results, resulting in the Belarusian Television and Radio Company (BTRC) being disqualified when the aforementioned song and another potential song were deemed to breach the contest's rules on neutrality and politicisation.

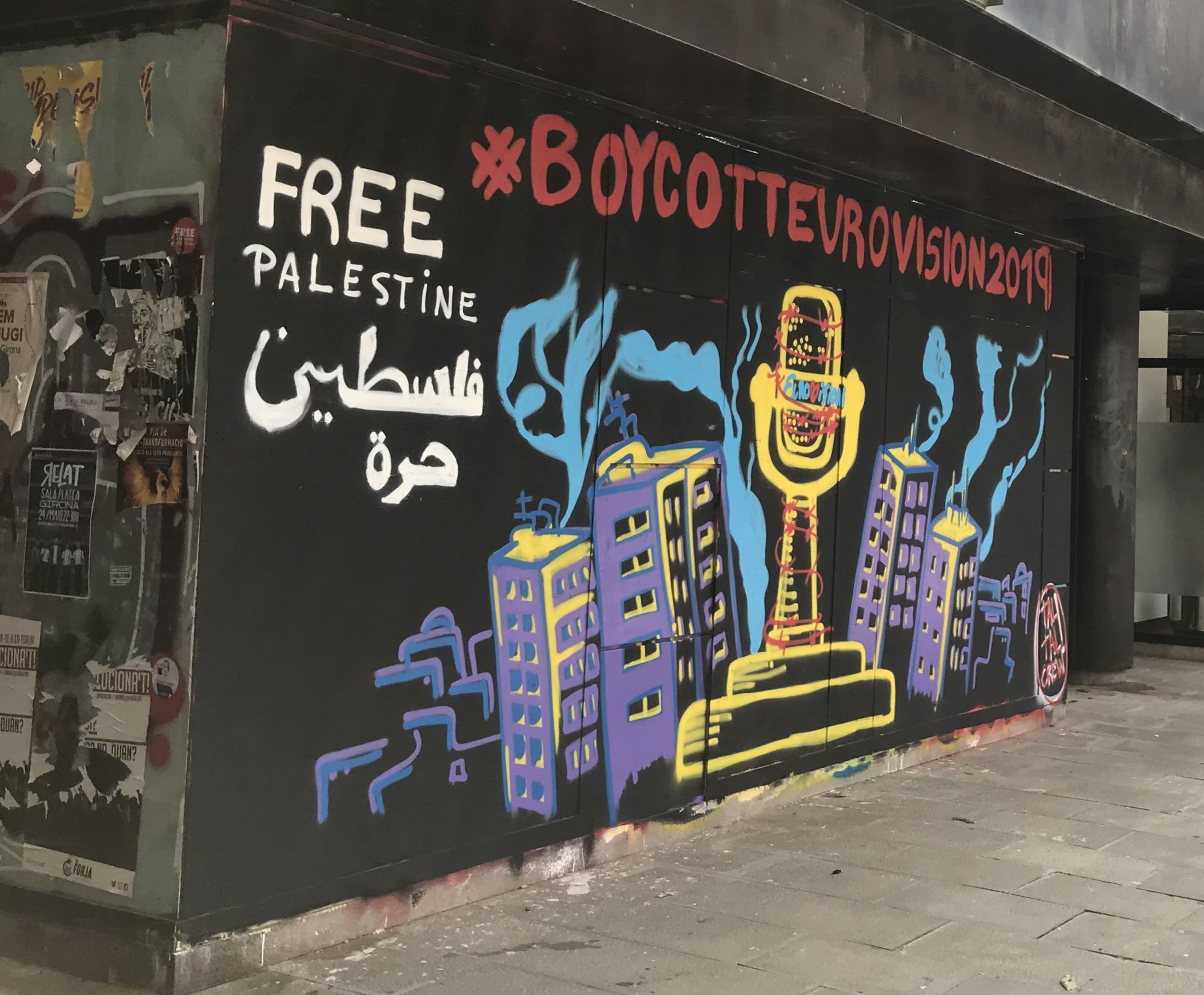
A mural in Girona, Spain, promoting a boycott of the 2019 contest in Israel

Israel's participation in the contest has resulted in several controversial moments in the past, with the country's first appearance in 1973, less than a year after the Munich massacre, resulting in an increased security presence at the venue in Luxembourg City. Its first win in 1978 proved controversial for Arab states broadcasting the contest which would typically cut to advertisements when Israel performed due to a lack of recognition of the country, and when it became apparent Israel would win, many of these broadcasters cut the feed before the end of the voting. Broadcasters from Arab states which are eligible to compete have largely not participated, with Morocco the only Arab state to have entered Eurovision, competing for the first, and to date only time, in 1980 when Israel was absent.

Israel's participation has been criticised by those who oppose current government policies in the state as well as on the Israeli–Palestinian conflict, with calls raised by various political groups for a boycott ahead of the 2019 contest in Tel Aviv, including proponents of the Boycott, Divestment and Sanctions movement in response to the country's policies towards Palestinians in the West Bank and Gaza, as well as groups who take issue with perceived pinkwashing in Israel. Others campaigned against a boycott, asserting that any cultural boycott would be antithetical to advancing peace in the region.

Following the outbreak of the Gaza war and subsequent genocide in October 2023, the Israeli–Palestinian conflict once again impacted the contest, with renewed calls for Israel's exclusion ahead of the 2024 event. "Hurricane", Israel's entry for that year's contest, was accepted by the EBU, although it was required to undergo rewrites as the EBU objected to the political nature of the original lyrics, which made reference to the 7 October attacks. Israel's second-place finish and win in the public vote in 2025 was contested by several participating countries, with Israel having conducted a large advertising campaign to encourage voting for its entry. (Note: Attributed to multiple references:) Broadcasters from Iceland, Ireland, the Netherlands, Slovenia, and Spain boycotted the 2026 edition after Israel was permitted to compete, with 2024 winner Nemo and 1994 winner Charlie McGettigan additionally returning their trophies in protest. Some media outlets described the situation as "the biggest crisis in the contest's history". (Note: By the following sources:)

=== Political and geographical voting ===
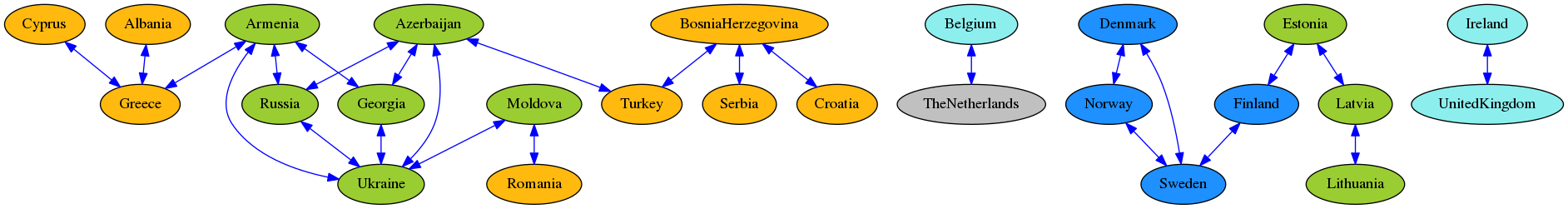
Voting preferences between countries in Eurovision between 1997 and 2017

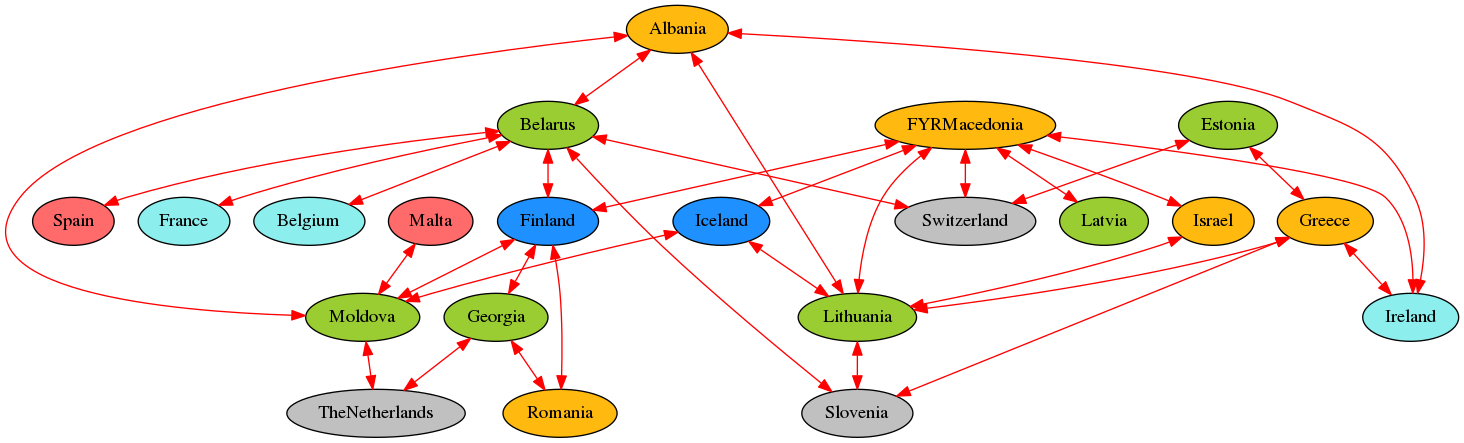
Mutual neglect of score allocations in Eurovision between 2010 and 2015

Produced using the methods presented by Mantzaris, Rein, and Hopkins: a network of the significant score deviations can be viewed over a time period of interest.
Southwest Northwest North Central Southeast East

The contest has been described as containing political elements in its voting process, a perception that countries will give votes more frequently and in higher quantities to other countries based on political relationships, rather than the musical merits of the songs themselves. Numerous studies and academic papers have been written on this subject, which have corroborated that certain countries form "clusters" or "cliques" by frequently voting in the same way; one study concludes that voting blocs can play a crucial role in deciding the winner of the contest, with evidence that on at least two occasions bloc voting was a pivotal factor in the vote for the winning song. Other views on these "blocs" argue that certain countries will allocate high points to others based on similar musical tastes, shared cultural links and a high degree of similarity and mutual intelligibility between languages, and are therefore more likely to appreciate and vote for the competing songs from these countries based on these factors, rather than political relationships specifically. Analysis on other voting patterns have revealed examples which indicate voting preferences among countries based on shared religion, as well as "patriotic voting", particularly since the introduction of televoting in 1997, where foreign nationals vote for their country of origin.

Voting patterns in the contest have been reported by news publishers, including The Economist, The Times, and BBC News. Criticism of the voting system was at its highest in the mid-2000s, resulting in a number of calls for countries to boycott the contest over reported voting biases, particularly following the 2007 contest where Eastern European countries occupied the top 15 places in the final and dominated the qualifying spaces. The poor performance of the entries from more traditional Eurovision countries had subsequently been discussed in European national parliaments. (Note: The developments in the voting was cited as among the reasons for the resignation of Terry Wogan as commentator for the BBC, a role he had performed at every contest from 1980.) In response to this criticism, the EBU introduced a second semi-final in 2008, with countries split based on geographic proximity and voting history, and juries of music professionals were reintroduced in 2009, in an effort to reduce the impacts of bloc voting.

=== LGBTQ visibility ===
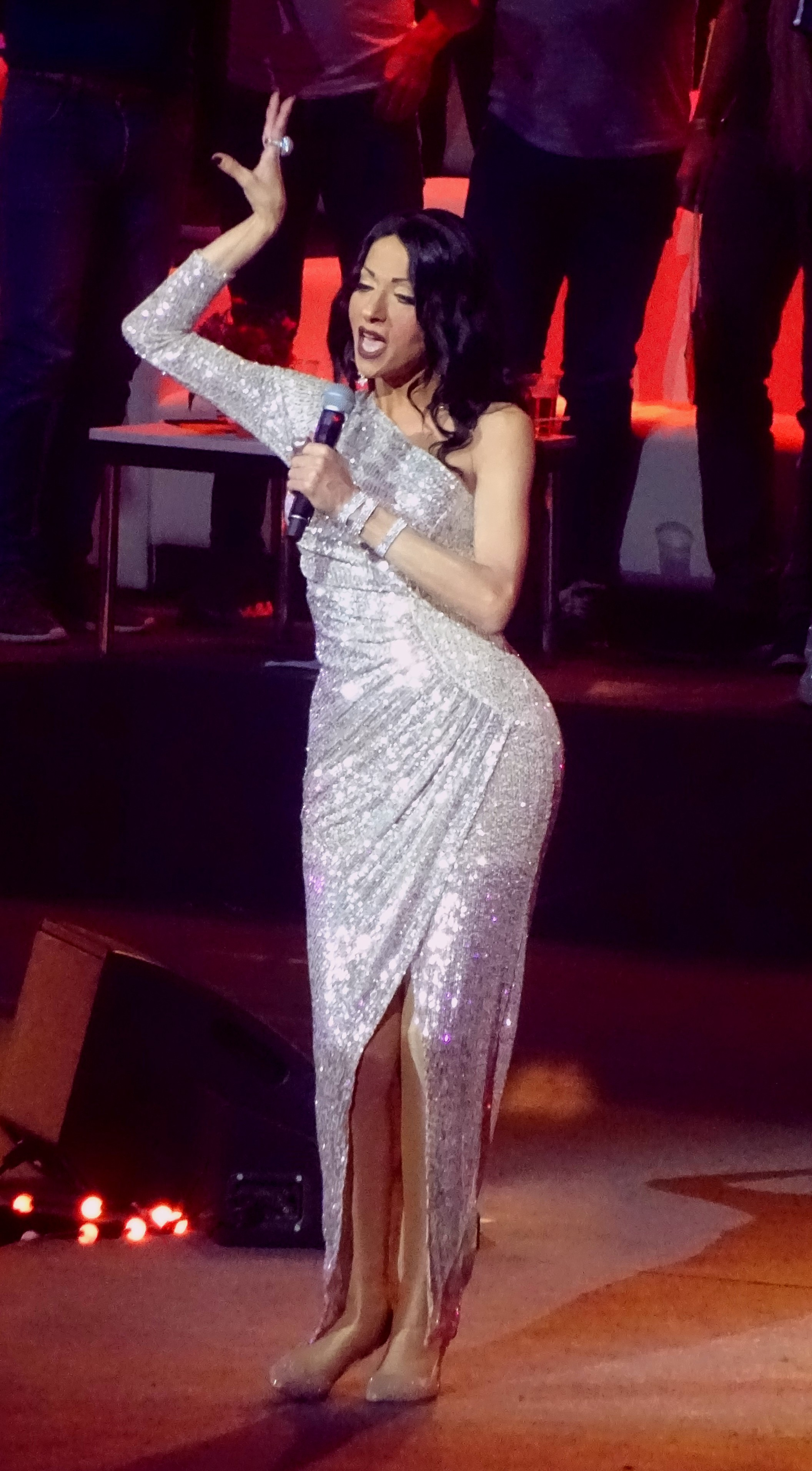
Dana International, the contest's first trans participant, and winner of the 1998 contest for Israel

Eurovision has had a long-held fan base in the LGBTQ community, and contest organisers have actively worked to include these fans in the event since the 1990s. Paul Oscar became the contest's first openly gay artist to compete when he represented Iceland in 1997. Dana International, representing Israel in 1998, was the contest's first trans performer, and became the first LGBTQ artist to win the contest. In 2021, Nikkie de Jager became the first trans person to host the contest.

Several open members of the LGBTQ community have since gone on to compete and win: Conchita Wurst, the drag persona of openly gay Thomas Neuwirth, won for Austria in 2014. Marija Šerifović, who won for Serbia in 2007, subsequently came out publicly as a lesbian in 2013. Openly bisexual performer Duncan Laurence was the winner for the Netherlands in 2019; and rock band Måneskin, which won for Italy in 2021, features openly lesbian Victoria De Angelis as its bassist, who at the time of the contest also identified as bisexual. Nemo, who represented Switzerland in 2024, was the first non-binary winner.

Past competing songs and performances have included references and allusions to same-sex relationships; "Nous les amoureux", the winning song for Luxembourg in 1961, contained references to the difficulties faced by a homosexual relationship; Krista Siegfrids' performance of "Marry Me" for Finland in 2013 included a same-sex kiss with one of her female backing dancers; and Ryan O'Shaughnessy's performance of "Together" for Ireland in 2018 featured two male dancers portraying a same-sex relationship. Drag performers, such as Verka Serduchka for Ukraine in 2007, DQ for Denmark in 2007, Sestre for Slovenia in 2002, have appeared, including Wurst winning in 2014.

Various political ideologies across Europe have clashed in the Eurovision setting, particularly on LGBTQ rights. Dana International's selection for the 1998 contest was marked by objections and death threats from orthodox religious sections of Israeli society, and at the contest her accommodation was reportedly in the only hotel in Birmingham with bulletproof windows. Türkiye Radyo ve Televizyon Kurumu (TRT) from Turkey, once a regular participant in the contest and a one-time winner, first pulled out of the contest in 2013, citing dissatisfaction in the voting rules; more recently when asked about returning to the contest it has cited LGBTQ performances as another reason for its continued boycott, refusing to broadcast the 2013 event over Finland's same sex kiss. LGBTQ visibility in the contest has been cited as a deciding factor for the non-participation of Médiaszolgáltatás-támogató és Vagyonkezelő Alap (MTVA) from Hungary since 2020, although no official reason was given. The rise of anti-LGBTQ rhetoric in Europe led to a marked increase in booing from contest audiences in protest, particularly since the introduction of a "gay propaganda" law in Russia in 2013. Conchita Wurst's win was met with criticism on the Russian political stage, with several conservative politicians voicing displeasure in the result. Clashes on LGBTQ visibility in the contest have occurred in countries which do not compete, such as in China, where broadcasting rights were terminated during the 2018 contest due to censorship of "abnormal sexual relationships and behaviours" that went against Chinese broadcasting guidelines.

== Cultural influence ==
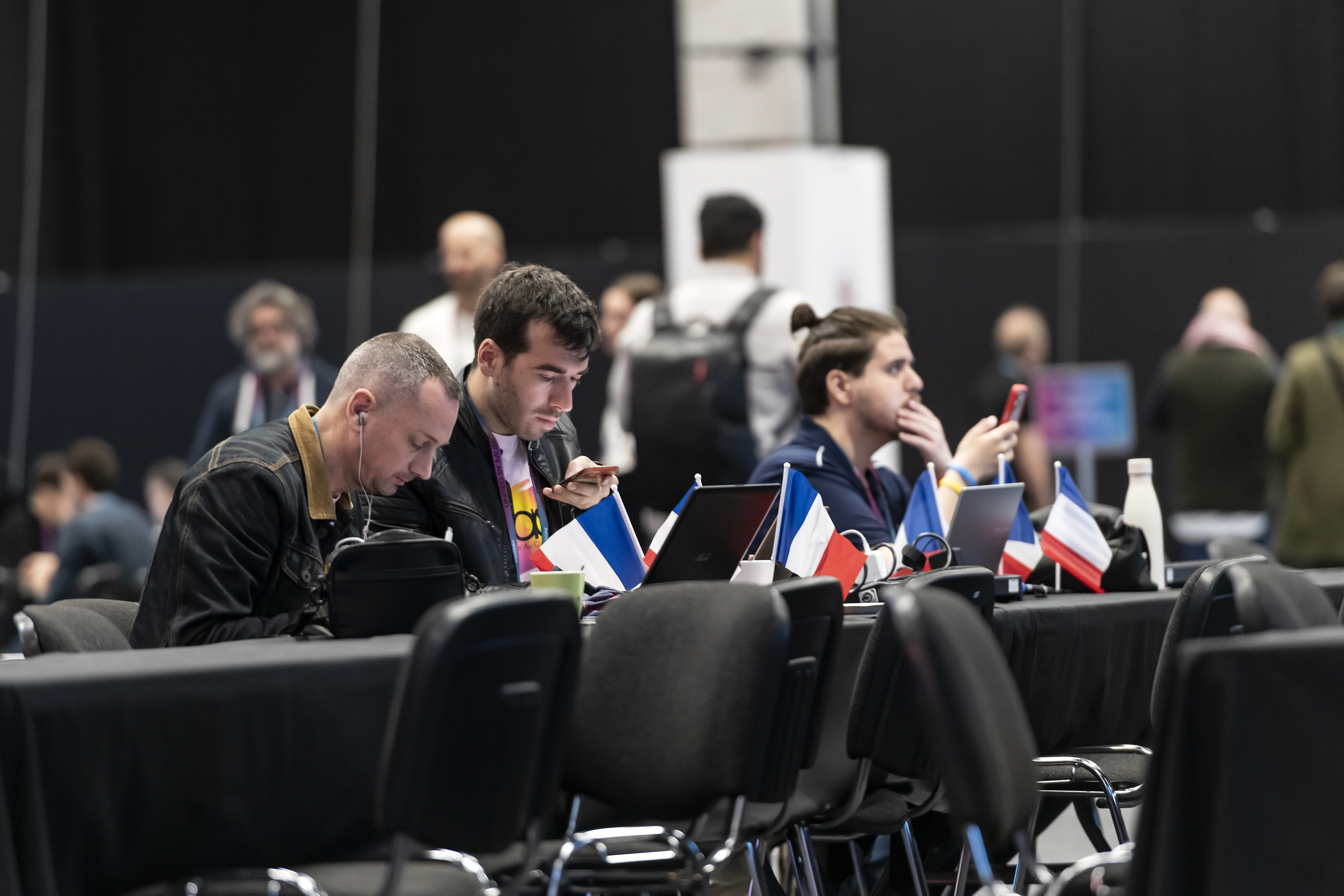
Fan media working at the 2024 contest in Malmö

The Eurovision Song Contest has amassed a global following and sees annual audience figures of between 100 and 200 million in the 21st century, though figures as high as 700 million for the 1980s were reported by some sources. The contest has become a cultural influence worldwide since its first years. It is regularly described as having kitsch appeal, and is included as a topic of parody in television sketches and in stage performances at the Edinburgh Fringe and Melbourne Comedy festivals amongst others. Several films have been created which celebrate the contest, including 1972 Spanish musical En un mundo nuevo, Eytan Fox's 2013 Israeli comedy Cupcakes, and Netflix's 2020 musical comedy, Eurovision Song Contest: The Story of Fire Saga, produced with backing from the EBU and starring Will Ferrell and Rachel McAdams.

Eurovision has a large online following and multiple independent websites, news blogs and fan clubs are dedicated to the event. One of the oldest and largest Eurovision fan clubs is the Organisation Générale des Amateurs de l'Eurovision (OGAE), founded in 1984 in Finland and grew into a network of over 40 national branches worldwide. National branches regularly host events to promote and celebrate Eurovision, and several participating broadcasters work closely with these branches when preparing their entries.

In the run-up to each year's contest, smaller events are regularly hosted in several countries between the conclusion of the national selection shows in March and the contest proper in May, known as the "pre-parties". These events typically feature the artists which will go on to compete at that year's contest, and consist of performances at a venue and meet-and-greets with fans and the press. Eurovision in Concert, held annually in Amsterdam, was one of the first of these events to be created, holding its first edition in 2008. Other events held regularly include the London Eurovision Party in London and PrePartyES in Madrid. Several community events have been held virtually, particularly since the outbreak of the COVID-19 pandemic in Europe in 2020, among these EurovisionAgain, an initiative where fans watched and discussed past contests in sync on YouTube and other social media platforms. Launched during the first COVID-19 lockdowns, the event subsequently became a top trend on Twitter across Europe and facilitated over £20,000 in donations for UK-based LGBTQ charities.

== Special events and related competitions ==
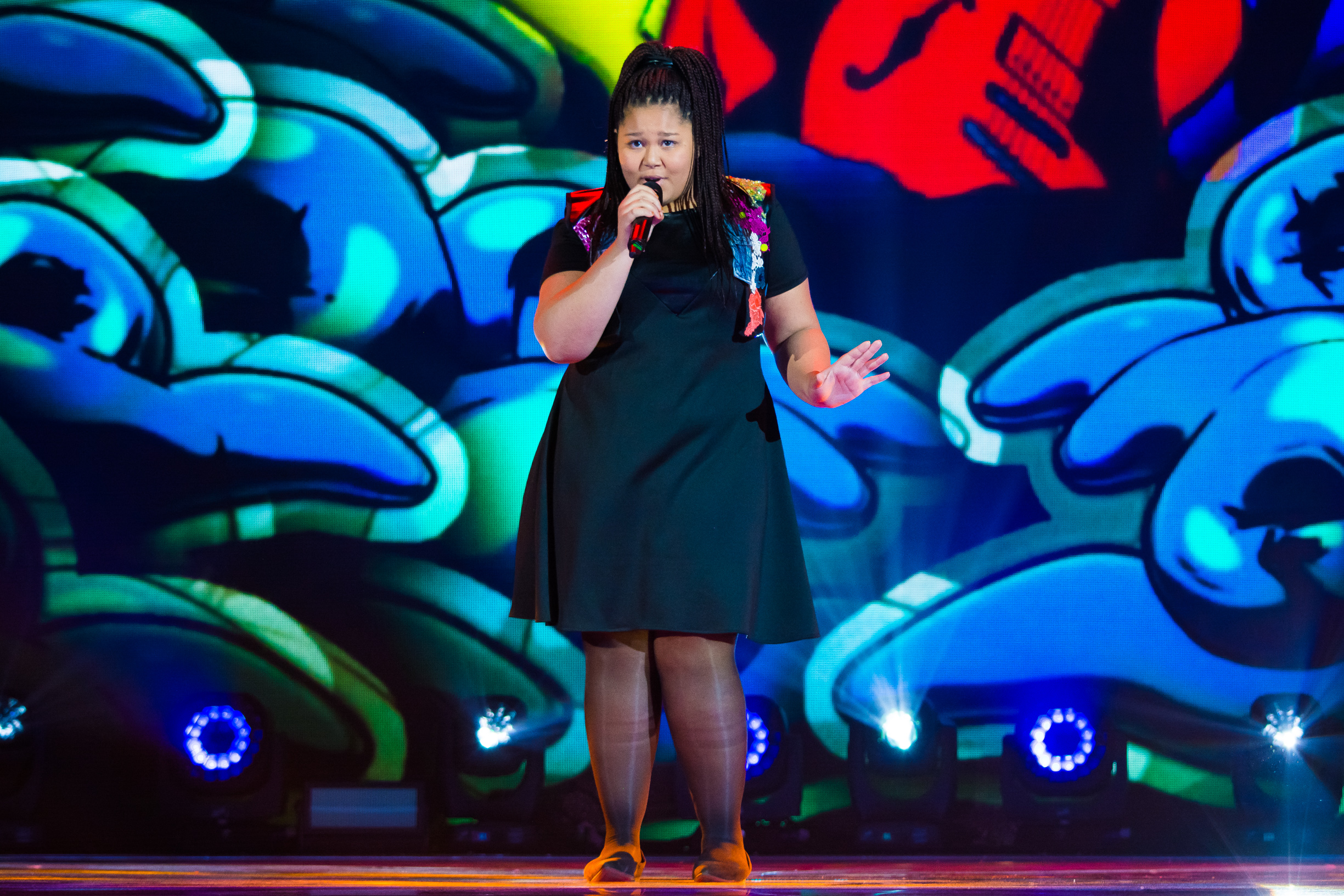
Destiny Chukunyere won the 2015 edition of the Junior Eurovision Song Contest for Malta.

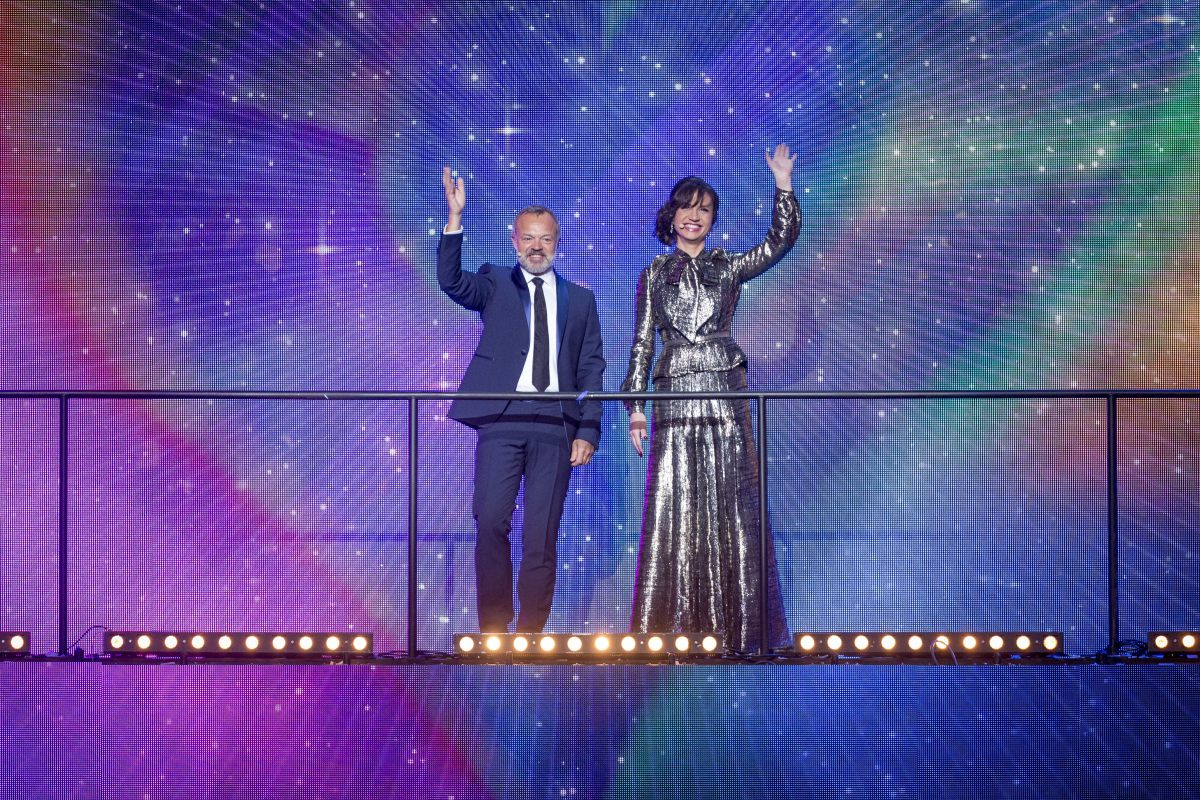
Hosts Graham Norton and Petra Mede during Eurovision Song Contest's Greatest Hits, a special event marking the contest's 60th anniversary

Several anniversary events, and related contests under the "Eurovision Live Events" brand, have been organised by the EBU with its member broadcasters. In addition, participating broadcasters have occasionally commissioned special Eurovision programmes for their home audiences, and a number of other imitator contests have been developed outside of the EBU framework, on both a national and international level.

The EBU has held several events to mark selected anniversaries in the contest's history: Songs of Europe, held in 1981 to celebrate its twenty-fifth anniversary, had live performances and video recordings of all Eurovision Song Contest winners up to 1981; Congratulations: 50 Years of the Eurovision Song Contest was organised in 2005 to celebrate the event's fiftieth anniversary, and featured a contest to determine the most popular song from among 14 selected entries from the contest's first 50 years; and the event's sixtieth anniversary was marked in 2015 by Eurovision Song Contest's Greatest Hits, a concert of performances by past Eurovision artists and video montages of performances and footage from previous contests. Following the cancellation of the 2020 contest, the EBU organised a special non-competitive broadcast, Eurovision: Europe Shine a Light, which provided a showcase for the songs that would have taken part in the competition. A concert tour consisting of shows in indoor arenas across ten European cities and featuring notable past entrants as well as ten acts from the 2026 contest was announced in early 2026 for the contest's seventieth anniversary, though it was later postponed, with Blick reporting that it was cancelled entirely due to low demand and high ticket prices.

Other contests organised by the EBU include Eurovision Young Musicians, a classical music competition for European musicians between the ages of 12 and 21; Eurovision Young Dancers, a dance competition for non-professional performers between the ages of 16 and 21; Eurovision Choir, a choral competition for non-professional European choirs produced in partnership with the Interkultur Foundation and modelled after the World Choir Games; and the Junior Eurovision Song Contest, a similar song contest for singers aged between 9 and 14 representing their countries. The Eurovision Dance Contest was an event featuring pairs of dancers performing ballroom and Latin dancing, which took place for two editions, in 2007 and 2008.

Similar international music competitions have been organised externally to the EBU. The Sopot International Song Festival has been held annually since 1961; between 1977 and 1980, under the patronage of the International Radio and Television Organisation (OIRT), an Eastern European broadcasting union similar to the EBU, it was rebranded as the Intervision Song Contest. An Ibero-American contest, the OTI Festival, was held by the Organización de Televisión Iberoamericana (OTI) between 1972 and 2000 among hispanophone and lusophone broadcasters in Europe and the Americas; and a contest for countries and autonomous regions with Turkic links, the Turkvision Song Contest, held four editions between 2013 and 2020. Similarly, an adaptation of the contest for artists in the United States, the American Song Contest, was held in 2022 and featured songs representing U.S. states and territories. Further adaptations of the contest were also announced for Canada and Latin America in 2022, though the former had been shelved by 2025; the Canadian Broadcasting Corporation subsequently became a full member of the EBU in 2026, leading to the planned debut of Canada in the main contest in 2027. An adaptation for the Asia-Pacific region, Eurovision Song Contest Asia, debuted in 2026. Both the American Song Contest and the Eurovision Song Contest Asia were organised by Voxovation under licence from the EBU.
