= Galasy ZMesta =

Music group from Belarus

Galasy ZMesta Галасы ЗМеста
- Origin: Baranavichy, Brest Region, Belarus
- Years active: 2020–present
- Members: Dmitry Butakov; Irina Sorgovitskaya; Maxim Ponomarenko; Evgeniy Kardash; Evgeniy Artyukh
- Website: galasyzmesta.by

Galasy ZMesta (Belarusian: Галасы ЗМеста [ɣalaˈsɨ ˈzmʲɛsta], lit. 'Voices from the Place') is a Belarusian band that was formed in 2020 in the city of Baranavichy.

The band was selected by national broadcaster BTRC to represent Belarus in the Eurovision Song Contest 2021 with the song "Ya nauchu tebya (I'll Teach You)", that was released on 9 March 2021. However, on 11 March 2021, it was decided by the European Broadcasting Union that their song had put "the non-political nature of Eurovision in question" and the song was disqualified. The band presented a second song "Pesnya pro zaytsev (Song About Hares)" which was in its turn rejected by the EBU for similar reasons depriving the band and Belarus from taking part in the 2021 contest altogether.

== Before Eurovision ==
The band members had been playing together for a long time. But as Galasy ZMesta, it was formed in 2020, during the 2020–2021 Belarusian protests. The band became known for their satirical songs, including criticism of the Belarusian opposition leaders Svetlana Tikhanovskaya, Pavel Latushko and Maria Kolesnikova, who opposed President Alexander Lukashenko's regime.

Right from the outset, the band planned to sing songs on topical often controversial issues of the day and express populist views of the Belarusian events from the point of view of the ordinary folk of the hinterland, the provinces away from the main cities. Speaking to the Belarusian website TUT.BY, the band frontman Butakov said he was against "radical and pseudo-revolutionary changes" pushed by "strange, replaceable, endless leaders". By March 2021, they already had about 20 songs on their website and YouTube channel performed live. The songs were mostly antagonistic to the onslaught of various "color revolutions" who used tactics which only destroyed, in the band's opinion, many countries under the guise of legitimate "political struggles". The band's ironic tongue-in-cheek songs often overlapped with criticism towards protest themes used in color revolutions. The group also had a satirical song called "Euro Dream" (in Russian "Евромечта") expressing anti-EU sentiments. In it, the band was lampooning "modern European values". As their fame grew in notoriety, online views and in media coverage, the band gave a concert at the Janka Kupala National Theatre in December 2020 to its fans.

== Selection for the Eurovision Song Contest ==
On 9 March 2021, Belarusian broadcaster BTRC confirmed that Galasy ZMesta would represent Belarus in the Eurovision Song Contest 2021. The contest took place in Rotterdam, the Netherlands, and consisted of two semi-finals on 18 May and 20 May 2021, and the Grand Final on 22 May 2021. On 17 November 2020, it was announced that Belarus would be performing in the first half of the first semi-final of the contest.

=== First song ===
Galasy ZMesta announced they were participating in Eurovision with the song "Ya Nauchu Tebya" with the subtitle "(I'll Teach You)". The song elicited a strongly negative response. Within hours of its release, a Change.org petition was started requesting Belarus' disqualification from Eurovision 2021 due to lyrics which were interpreted as celebrating "political oppression and slavery". It generated over one thousand signatures in twelve hours. The day after the song's announcement, the EBU issued a statement asserting that due to the political nature of the song, it did not follow the rules of the contest. The Belarusian broadcaster were subsequently given the option of either resubmitting a modified version of the song not pursuing political agendas or selecting a completely different song. A new deadline was set for the broadcaster. Failure to do so could result in Belarus's disqualification from the contest.

=== Second song ===
During the extended set deadline, Galasy ZMesta presented an alternative song "Pesnya pro zaytsev (Song About Hares)" (in Russian: Песня про зайцев). Although it included references in the form of a fable about a gullible rabbit that gets eaten by a fox, and generally is about various farm animals, each of which "has only one dream – to end up on a dinner table before others", these lyrics were considered as latent political references to the Belarusian opposition. Objections also flew about the alleged use of homophobic language and political connotations in its lyrics. The bunny is a homophobic slur sometimes used against gay men in Belarus. Galasy ZMesta frontman Dmitry Butakov told Current Time TV, that the band members are "completely apolitical" and their lyrics were merely ironic. The song again came under criticism considering these references to rabbits and foxes were also references to the political conflict in Belarus and further criticism of political opponents. On 26 March 2021, the EBU released a statement that two songs by Galasy ZMesta were rejected thus Belarus were no longer going to be participating in the contest. In response, Ivan Eismont, the head of BTRC, responsible for choosing both entries, slammed the Eurovision disqualification as "politically motivated". He said that the EBU was pressured by politicians and Belarusian anti-government activists who had waged an online campaign against the country's entry. BTRC earlier said in a news report that the organizers failed to clarify which specific verses in the songs presented by Belarus the Eurovision found to be politically objectionable.

== Discography ==
=== Singles ===
- 2020: "Euro Dream" (Russian: Евромечта, romanized: Yevromechta)
- 2021: "Ya nauchu tebya (I'll Teach You)" (Russian: Я Научу Тебя)
- 2021: "Pesnya pro zaytsev (Song About Hares)" (Russian: Песня про зайцев)
