= Belarus in the Eurovision Song Contest 2021 =

- Eurovision Song Contest 2021
- Participating broadcaster: Belarusian Television and Radio Company (BTRC)
- Country: Belarus
- Selection process: Internal selection
- Announcement date: 9 March 2021

Competing entry
- Artist: Galasy ZMesta

Placement
- Final result: Disqualified

Participation chronology

Belarus was set to be represented at the Eurovision Song Contest 2021. The Belarusian participating broadcaster, the Belarusian Television and Radio Company (BTRC), internally selected Galasy ZMesta as its representative, initially with the song "Ya nauchu tebya (I'll Teach You)", but the entry was deemed ineligible to compete by the European Broadcasting Union (EBU) due to violation of the contest's rules against political entries. After their replacement entry "Pesnya pro zaytsev (Song About Hares)" was also deemed ineligible, BTRC was disqualified from the contest on 26 March 2021. This was the first time Belarus was absent from the contest since their debut in 2004. Belarus was originally set to compete in the first half of the first semi-final on 18 May 2021.

== Background ==
Prior to the 2021 contest, the Belarusian Television and Radio Company (BTRC) had participated in the Eurovision Song Contest representing Belarus sixteen times since its first entry in 2004. Its best placing in the contest was sixth, achieved in 2007 with the song "Work Your Magic" performed by Dmitry Koldun. Following the introduction of semi-finals in the 2004 contest, Belarus had managed to qualify to the final six times. In 2019, Belarus qualified to the final and placed twenty-fourth with the song "Like It" performed by Zena. In 2020, VAL was set to represent Belarus with the song "Da vidna" before the event's cancellation.

As part of its duties as participating broadcaster, BTRC organises the selection of its entry in the Eurovision Song Contest and broadcasts the event in the country. From 2012 to 2020, the broadcaster has organised a national final in order to choose its entry. However, the broadcaster selected its 2021 entry via an internal selection.

== Before Eurovision ==
=== Internal selection ===
In March 2020, regarding the selection of the 2020 Belarusian participants, VAL, during a broadcast of Makaionka, 9 then Belarusian Eurovision commentator Evgeny Perlin stated that BTRC had not confirmed VAL yet, because "there [was] still time for that". The duo was not selected for the 2021 contest as a result of a string of events in the aftermath of the 2020–2021 Belarusian protests. In the run-up towards and after the August 2020 Belarusian presidential elections, VAL showed support for opposition candidate Sviatlana Tsikhanouskaya and subsequently openly supported the Belarusian democracy movement. After not having appeared in the media for five months, VAL gave an interview to an independent publication in September 2020, stating that they had not been allowed to talk with the media according to their contract and that they felt neglected by the broadcaster. The following day, BTRC confirmed that they would not internally select VAL for the second consecutive year, stating the duo had "no conscience".

BTRC opened a submission period where artists and composers were able to submit a live performance of their entries to the broadcaster between 1 January 2021 and 31 January 2021. At the closing of the deadline, 50 entries were received by the broadcaster and among the artists that had submitted entries was Daz Sampson, who represented the United Kingdom in 2006. On 9 March 2021, BTRC announced "Ya nauchu tebya (I'll Teach You)" (Russian: Я научу тебя) performed by the band Galasy ZMesta as its entry for the Eurovision Song Contest 2021. The song would have been Belarus' first entry performed in the Russian language at the Eurovision Song Contest.

=== Disqualification ===
After the release of Belarusian 2021 entry, there were immediate calls for the country to be disqualified from the contest, due to the "obvious political subtext" of the song. Among others, the Swedish political party Liberalerna and the Belarusian Foundation for Cultural Solidarity called for Belarus to be disqualified from the contest. Several Eurovision news outlets also announced that they would be limiting the coverage of the song. On 11 March 2021, the EBU released a statement, stating that after scrutinizing the entry, they concluded that "the song puts the non-political nature of the Contest in question". As a result, the EBU declared the entry ineligible to compete in the contest, and demanded that BTRC must either submit a new version of the song or an entirely new song that was compliant with the rules, or face disqualification.

Due to the EBU releasing a statement declaring the original entry ineligible, on 13 March 2021, Belarusian president Alexander Lukashenko stated that he would potentially order BTRC to opt for a new entry instead of modifying the lyrics of the original song. On 26 March 2021, Galasy ZMesta submitted a new song, titled "Pesnya pro zaytsev (Song About Hares)" (Russian: Песня про зайцев), as the replacement entry. The new song was also rejected by the EBU for the same reasons as their previous attempt, and BTRC was subsequently disqualified from the 2021 contest.

== After Eurovision ==
On 28 May 2021, six days after the 2021 final, the EBU voted to suspend BTRC's membership for three years. BTRC was given two weeks to respond before the suspension comes into effect on 11 June, but there was no public response. The broadcaster was entirely expelled from the EBU on 1 July, therefore losing the rights to broadcast and participate in the contest.
