= Ya nauchu tebya (I'll Teach You) =

2021 song by Galasy ZMesta

Single by Galasy ZMesta
- Released: 9 March 2021

Music video
- "Ya nauchu tebya (I'll Teach You)" on YouTube

Eurovision Song Contest 2021 entry
- Country: Belarus
- Artist: Galasy ZMesta
- Language: Russian

Finals performance
- Final result: Disqualified

Entry chronology
- ◄ "Da vidna" (2020)

"Ya nauchu tebya (I'll Teach You)" (Russian: Я научу тебя) is a song by Belarusian band Galasy ZMesta. The song was selected by the Belarusian national broadcaster BTRC to represent Belarus in the Eurovision Song Contest 2021 in Rotterdam, the Netherlands, but was rejected by the competition's organisers for having content which they believed was too political in nature. The music video was also taken down from the official Eurovision site.

== Eurovision Song Contest ==
On 9 March 2021, Belarusian broadcaster BTRC announced that Galasy ZMesta would represent Belarus in the 2021 contest with the song "Ya nauchu tebya". The song would be performed in the first half of the first semi-final of the contest. Although many artists who had originally planned to participate in the cancelled Eurovision 2020 contest returned to Eurovision 2021, state broadcaster BTRC had confirmed in September 2020 that they would refuse to reselect VAL as Belarus' representatives due to their support for the 2020–2021 Belarusian protests, alleging that the duo "had no conscience".

"Ya nauchu tebya" elicited a strongly negative response from Eurovision fans. Within hours of its release, a Change.org petition was started requesting Belarus' disqualification from Eurovision 2021 due to lyrics which were interpreted as celebrating "political oppression and slavery". It generated over one thousand signatures in twelve hours. Later in the day, Sweden withdrew Belarus' place on the Melodifestivalen jury, asking the United Kingdom to step in as a replacement. Several Eurovision news websites stated that they would stop giving coverage to the entry.

Two days after the song's announcement, the European Broadcasting Union (EBU) issued a statement asserting that due to the political nature of the song, it did not follow the rules of the contest. The Belarusian broadcaster was subsequently given the option of either resubmitting a modified version of the song, or selecting a different song. Should Belarus refuse both alternatives, the country would no longer able to compete.

A second song was proposed titled "Pesnya pro zaytsev (Song About Hares)". This was in its turn rejected by the EBU, causing Belarus to be disqualified from the 2021 contest. The EBU issued a statement saying: "It was concluded that the new submission was also in breach of the rules of the competition that ensure the Contest is not instrumentalized or brought into disrepute. As BTRC have failed to submit an eligible entry within the extended deadline, regrettably, Belarus will not be participating in the 65th Eurovision Song Contest in May".

In June 2022, the head of BTRC Ivan Eismont admitted that the song was dedicated to the European Union.
