= Hotot =

Hotot may refer to:

- Hotot (program), a micro-blogging desktop client for Twitter
- Hotot-en-Auge, a commune in the Calvados department in the Normandy region in northwestern France
- Walter Hotot (fl. 1390), English politician
- Agnes Hotot (fl. 1395), English noblewoman
- Dwarf Hotot, a breed of domestic rabbit
- Blanc de Hotot, a breed of domestic rabbit
