= Dame =

Title in British Commonwealth honours systems

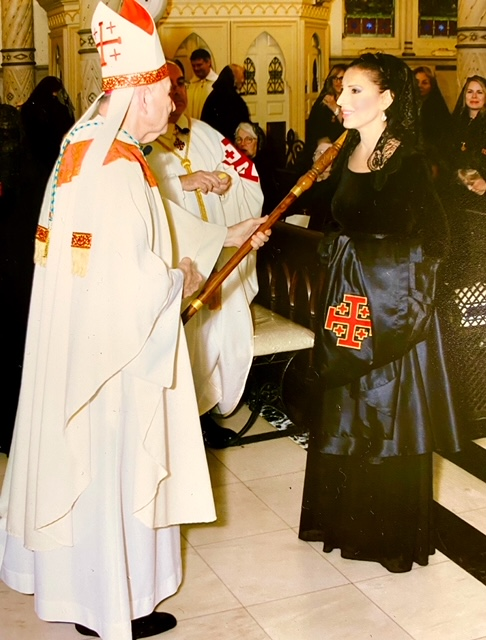
The investiture of Dame Lourett Russell Grant into the Order of the Holy Sepulchre

Dame is a traditionally British honorific title given to women who have been admitted to certain orders of chivalry. It is the female equivalent of Sir, the title used by knights. Baronetesses in their own right also use the title Dame.

A woman appointed to the grades of Dame Commander or Dame Grand Cross of the Order of Saint John, the Order of the Holy Sepulchre, the Order of the Bath, the Order of Saint Michael and Saint George, the Royal Victorian Order, or the Order of the British Empire becomes a dame. A Central European order in which female members receive the rank of Dame is the Order of Saint George. Since there is no female equivalent to a Knight Bachelor, women are always appointed to an order of chivalry. Women who are appointed to the Order of the Garter or the Order of the Thistle are given the title of Lady rather than Dame.

Women receive all their honours in the same fashion as men receiving decorations or medals, even if they are receiving a damehood, so there is no female word equivalent of being "knighted".

== History ==
The Order of the Ermine, founded in France by John V, Duke of Brittany, in 1381, was the first order of chivalry to accept women. However, female knights existed for centuries in many places in the world prior to this. Like their male counterparts, they were distinguished by the flying of coloured banners and generally bore a coat of arms.

One woman who participated in tournaments was Joane Agnes Hotot (born 1378), but she was not the only one. Additionally, women adopted certain forms of regalia which became closely associated with the status of knighthood.

Unlike the male knights, it was virtually unimaginable to see women taking part in medieval battles or commanding battalions of soldiers, but there were exceptions. Joan of Arc is the most famous; another case was the Welsh princess Gwenllian ferch Gruffydd. Some wore armour, others commanded troops, and some were members of an official order of chivalry. One woman to wear full armour into battle was the Duchess Gaita of Lombardy (also called Sikelgaita), who rode beside her Norman mercenary husband, Robert Guiscard. She was a knight in her own right. Another was Petronilla de Grandmesnil, Countess of Leicester; wearing a mail hauberk with a sword and a shield, she defended her lands from Henry II of England. She and her husband participated in the rebellion in 1173 against King Henry II. However, this does not mean that they were officially knighted the way men were.

Formerly, a knight's wife was given the title of Dame before her name, but this usage was replaced by Lady during the 17th century.

The title of Dame as the official equivalent of a knight was introduced in 1917 with the introduction of the Order of the British Empire, and was subsequently extended to the Royal Victorian Order in 1936, the Order of St Michael and St George, and finally the Order of the Bath in 1971.

The youngest person to be appointed a Dame was golfer Lydia Ko at the age of 27. The oldest had been actress Gwen Ffrangcon-Davies at the age of 100, until Olivia de Havilland was appointed two weeks before her 101st birthday.

Several high-profile figures have declined the honour, including Vanessa Redgrave, who eventually accepted the honour.

The prefix is used with the holder's given name or full name but never with the surname alone; this follows the same usage customs as "Sir".

Nuns of the English Benedictine order are given the title Dame in preference to Sister.

In French Louisiana from the 17th through to the 19th centuries, Dame was the title accorded to a woman "of substance or position in the locality". Similarly, in 1889 in France, it was reportedly "a title of honour which long distinguished high-born ladies from the wives of citizens and the commonalty in general" and a title of respect for a widow.
