= Keith Diamond =

Keith Diamond may refer to:

- Keith Diamond (songwriter) (1950–1997), American songwriter and producer
- Keith Diamond (actor) (born 1962), American TV and voice actor
