= Suddenly (Billy Ocean song) =

1985 song by Billy Ocean

Single by Billy Ocean

from the album Suddenly
- B-side: "Lucky Man"
- Released: March 1985 (US); 3 May 1985 (UK)
- Recorded: 1984
- Genre: Quiet storm; pop; soul
- Length: 3:55
- Label: Jive Records
- Songwriters: Keith Diamond, Billy Ocean
- Producer: Keith Diamond

Billy Ocean singles chronology
"Loverboy" (1984)	"Suddenly" (1985)	"Mystery Lady" (1985)

"Suddenly" is a song from 1985 co-written and performed by UK-based singer Billy Ocean. Co-written and produced by Keith Diamond, it is the title track to Ocean's 1984 breakthrough album.

Released as the third single from the album (following the success of "Caribbean Queen" and "Loverboy"), the ballad became the album's most successful single in the UK, reaching number four on the UK Singles Chart in mid-1985. The song also reached the same chart peak on the Billboard Hot 100 chart in the US, spending two weeks at number four in June of that year. It peaked at number five on the Billboard R&B chart and spent two weeks at number one on the Billboard adult contemporary chart.

== Music video ==
The music video features Billy Ocean appearing to perform the song live before an audience.

== Charts ==
=== Weekly charts ===
Weekly chart performance for "Suddenly"
Chart (1985)	Peak position
Australia (Kent Music Report)	15
Canada Top Singles (RPM)	7
Europe (European Top 100 Singles)	14
Finland (Suomen virallinen lista)	28
Ireland (IRMA)	4
Netherlands (Dutch Top 40)	23
Netherlands (Single Top 100)	20
New Zealand (Recorded Music NZ)	38
UK Singles (Official Charts)	4
US Billboard Hot 100	4
US Adult Contemporary (Billboard)	1
US Hot Black Singles (Billboard)	5
US Cash Box Top 100 Singles	4
US Top 100 Black Contemporary Singles (Cash Box)	5
West Germany (GfK)	50

=== Year-end charts ===
Year-end chart performance for "Suddenly"
Chart (1985)	Position
Canada Top Singles (RPM)	55
UK Singles (Gallup)	49
US Billboard Hot 100	52
US Adult Contemporary (Billboard)	6
US Hot Black Singles (Billboard)	26
US Cash Box Top 100 Singles	47
US Top 100 Black Contemporary Singles (Cash Box)	35

== See also ==
- List of number-one adult contemporary singles of 1985 (U.S.)
