= Suddenly (Billy Ocean album) =

1984 studio album by Billy Ocean

Studio album by Billy Ocean
- Released: 12 September 1984
- Recorded: August 1983 – March 1984
- Studios: Battery (London); Unique Recording (New York City)
- Genres: R&B; post-disco; soul
- Length: 45:12
- Label: Jive
- Producer: Keith Diamond

Billy Ocean chronology
Inner Feelings (1982)	Suddenly (1984)	Love Zone (1986)

Singles from Suddenly
- 1. "Caribbean Queen (No More Love on the Run)" Released: August 1984; 2. "Loverboy" Released: November 1984; 3. "Suddenly" Released: March 1985; 4. "Mystery Lady" Released: June 1985; 5. "The Long and Winding Road" Released: October 1985

Professional ratings
Review scores
Source	Rating
AllMusic	4/5 stars

Suddenly is the fifth studio album by British singer Billy Ocean, released on 12 September 1984 by Jive Records. It featured his first major US pop hit single "Caribbean Queen (No More Love on the Run)", which reached number one on the Billboard Hot 100. Prior to that, his biggest success on the US charts had been a number-22 placing for "Love Really Hurts Without You" in 1976, which was one of a number of UK hits he had achieved by the release of this album. Despite these earlier hits, Suddenly became Ocean's first charting album in the United Kingdom, reaching number nine on the UK Album Chart. It also reached number nine in the US, and spawned two additional US top-five singles in the title track and "Loverboy", while a fourth single, "Mystery Lady", reached the US top 40. "Caribbean Queen" and "Suddenly" also reached the top 10 of the UK Singles Chart.

== Track listing ==
All songs written by Keith Diamond and Billy Ocean, except where noted.

No.	Title	Writer(s)	Length
1.	"Caribbean Queen (No More Love on the Run)"		7:52
2.	"Mystery Lady"	Diamond, Ocean, James Woodley	5:02
3.	"Syncopation"	Diamond, Ocean, Jolyon Skinner	5:20
4.	"The Long and Winding Road"	John Lennon, Paul McCartney	4:40
5.	"Loverboy"	Diamond, Ocean, Robert Lange	5:16
6.	"Lucky Man"		4:21
7.	"Dancefloor"	Diamond, Ocean, Barry J. Eastmond	4:14
8.	"If I Should Lose You"		3:59
9.	"Suddenly"		3:53

=== 2011 expanded edition ===
No.	Title	Length
10.	"Caribbean Queen (No More Love on the Run)" (extended mix)	8:16
11.	"Lucky Man" (extended version)	6:07
12.	"Mystery Lady" (extended version)	6:49
13.	"Loverboy" (extended club mix)	8:08

=== Note ===
On the European release, the first track was "European Queen (No More Love on the Run)" (4:50), replacing "Caribbean Queen". On the UK Jive release (HIP 12), the track length was given (and measured) as 7:52 and titled "Caribbean Queen (No More Love on the Run)".

== Personnel ==
=== Musicians ===
- Billy Ocean – lead vocals, backing vocals, Simmons drums, LinnDrum
- Barry J. Eastmond – keyboards, synthesizers, string arrangements
- Pete Q. Harris – Fairlight programming
- J.J. Jeczalik – Fairlight programming
- Clarence "Binky" Brice – guitars
- Vic Linton – guitars
- Eddie Martinez – guitars
- Geoff Whitehorn – guitars
- Timmy Allen – bass guitar
- Keith Diamond – synth bass, Simmons drums, LinnDrum, backing vocals
- Terry Silverlight – drums (4, 9)
- Tony Maronie – percussion
- V. Jeffrey Smith – saxophones
- Chrissy Faith – backing vocals
- Lisa Fischer – backing vocals
- Katie Kissoon – backing vocals
- Curtis King – backing vocals
- Stevie Lange – backing vocals
- Cindy Mizelle – backing vocals
- Meekaeel Muhammad – backing vocals

=== Production ===
- Robert John "Mutt" Lange – executive producer (5)
- Keith Diamond – producer, mixing
- Steve Goldman – engineer
- Bryan "Chuck" New – engineer, mixing
- Peter Robbins – engineer
- Jon Hallett – studio assistant
- Amy Ziffer – studio assistant
- Donn Davenport – art direction
- Linda Fennimore – cover illustration
- Michael Hoppen – photography
- Laurie Jay – management

== Charts ==
=== Weekly charts ===
Weekly chart performance for Suddenly
Chart (1984–1985)	Peak position
Australian Albums (Kent Music Report)	13
Canada Top Albums/CDs (RPM)	14
Dutch Albums (Album Top 100)	23
European Albums (Eurotipsheet)	50
Finnish Albums (Suomen virallinen lista)	10
German Albums (Offizielle Top 100)	43
New Zealand Albums (RMNZ)	35
UK Albums (Official Charts)	9
US Billboard 200	9
US Top R&B/Hip-Hop Albums (Billboard)	3

=== Year-end charts ===
1984 year-end chart performance for Suddenly
Chart (1984)	Position
US Top R&B/Hip-Hop Albums (Billboard)	39

1985 year-end chart performance for Suddenly
Chart (1985)	Position
Australian Albums (Kent Music Report)	38
Canada Top Albums/CDs (RPM)	46
UK Albums (Gallup)	66
US Billboard 200	8
US Top R&B/Hip-Hop Albums (Billboard)	7

== Certifications ==
Certifications for Suddenly
Region	Certification	Certified units/sales
Canada (Music Canada)	3× Platinum	300,000^{^}
United Kingdom (BPI)	Gold	100,000^{^}
United States (RIAA)	2× Platinum	2,000,000^{^}
^{^} Shipments figures based on certification alone.
