= Always (James Ingram song) =

Single by James Ingram

from the album Never Felt So Good
- Released: 1986
- Genre: R&B
- Length: 4:17
- Label: Qwest Records; Warner Bros. Records
- Songwriter(s): James Ingram, Keith Diamond

Always is a 1986 song released by James Ingram, a track off his album, Never Felt So Good, on the Qwest Label. It became a top 30 R&B hit in America. The song peaked at number 27 on Hot Black Singles chart published by Billboard.

== Personnel ==
- Vocals & Backing Vocals: James Ingram
- Drums, Bass, Keyboards, Synthesizer [Farlight CMI]: Keith Diamond
- Synthesizer [Fairlight CMI]: Ned Liben
- Guitars: Clarence Brice
- Backing Vocals: Eldra DeBarge, Howard Hewett, David Pack
