= Hotot-en-Auge =

- Commune
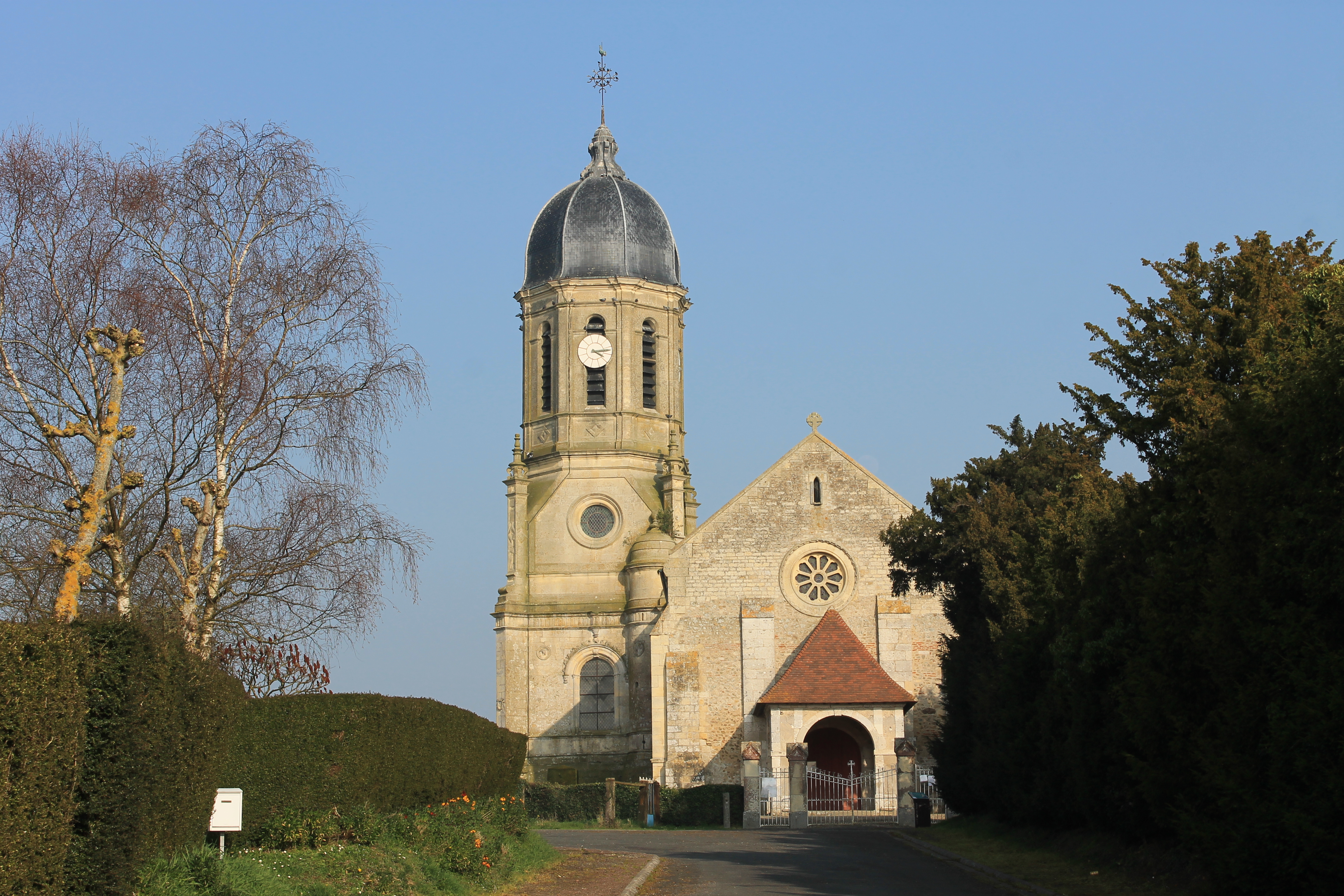
- Saint-Georges' church in Hotot-en-Auge
- Location of Hotot-en-Auge
- Location within France Location within Normandy
- Coordinates: 49°10′01″N 0°03′14″W
- Country: France
- Region: Normandy
- Department: Calvados
- Arrondissement: Lisieux
- Canton: Mézidon Vallée d'Auge
- Intercommunality: CC Normandie-Cabourg-Pays d'Auge

Government
  - Mayor (2020–2026): Brigitte Paturel
- Area^{1}: 24.05 km^{2} (9.29 sq mi)
- Elevation: 28 m (92 ft)
- Highest elevation: 35 m (115 ft)
- Lowest elevation: 2 m (6.6 ft)
- Population (2023): 285
  - Density: 11.9/km^{2} (30.7/sq mi)
- Time zone: UTC+01:00 (CET)
  - Summer (DST): UTC+02:00 (CEST)
- INSEE/Postal code: 14335 /14430
- ^{1} French Land Register data, which excludes lakes, ponds, glaciers > 1 km^{2} (0.386 sq mi or 247 acres) and river estuaries.

Hotot-en-Auge (French pronunciation: [ɔto ɑ̃.n‿oʒ], literally Hotot in Auge) is a commune in the Calvados department in the Normandy region in northwestern France. It is the namesake of the Dwarf Hotot and Blanc de Hotot breeds of Rabbit

== Demographics ==
Historical population
Year	Pop.	±% p.a.
1968	345	—
1975	275	−3.19%
1982	264	−0.58%
1990	300	+1.61%
1999	281	−0.72%
2007	298	+0.74%
2012	308	+0.66%
2017	302	−0.39%
2023	285	−0.96%
Source: INSEE

== See also ==
- Communes of the Calvados department
