= Keith Diamond (songwriter) =

American songwriter and producer (1950–1997)

- Born: Keith Vincent Constantine Alexander; March 11, 1950; Trinidad and Tobago
- Died: January 18, 1997 (aged 46) Manhattan, New York City, U.S.
- Occupations: Songwriter; producer

Keith Diamond (born Keith Vincent Constantine Alexander; March 11, 1950 – January 18, 1997) was an American songwriter and music producer.

== Career ==
Diamond moved to London to pursue a career as a musician and producer in 1969. He signed on as a songwriter with Zomba after he moved to New York in 1980, and soon afterwards become known for his streamlined rhythm-and-blues pop style.

Diamond produced the Billy Ocean album Suddenly, co-writing the album's title track, "Caribbean Queen", and "Loverboy". At Quincy Jones' request, Diamond also produced and co-wrote James Ingram's 1986 album Never Felt So Good. Diamond's composition of "Red Hot Lover" on Ingram's album was inspired by Lourett Russell Grant, a musical recording artist with whom Diamond had a personal relationship.

Over the course of his career, Diamond produced and managed groups such as Starpoint and Fredrick Thomas, and also worked with several prominent performers including Donna Summer, Michael Bolton, Sheena Easton, Mick Jagger and Don Johnson.

== Death ==
Diamond died in his Manhattan home on January 18, 1997, of a sudden heart attack.
