= Never Felt So Good =

Studio album by James Ingram
- Released: July 15, 1986
- Recorded: 1985–1986
- Studios: Unique and Sigma (New York City, New York); Master Sound (Franklin Square, New York); Lion Share (Los Angeles, California); Lighthouse (Studio City, California)
- Genre: R&B
- Length: 42:53
- Labels: Qwest, Warner Bros.
- Producers: Keith Diamond; James Ingram

James Ingram chronology
It's Your Night (1983)	Never Felt So Good (1986)	It's Real (1989)

Never Felt So Good is the second full-length album by R&B singer-songwriter James Ingram, released in 1986. It reached number 123 on the US charts, and peaked at number 37 on the R&B charts. It reached number 72 in Britain.

== Critical reception ==
Professional ratings
Review scores
Source	Rating
AllMusic	3/5 stars
The Encyclopedia of Popular Music	3/5 stars
The Philadelphia Inquirer	2/4 stars

The Los Angeles Times wrote that the album "is dominated by inferior upbeat material and undermined by punchless production. The few ballads should be the high points but they're woefully schmaltzy."

== Track listing ==
All songs written by James Ingram and Keith Diamond, except where noted.

1. "Always" - 4:17
2. "Never Felt So Good" (Diamond, Ingram, Howard Hewett) - 4:03
3. "Red Hot Lover" - 3:50
4. "Lately" - 4:15
5. "Wings of My Heart" - 3:12
6. "Trust Me" - 4:17
7. "Tuff" - 1:03
8. "Say Hey" (Ingram, Bernard Taylor) - 4:02
9. "Love's Been Here and Gone" (Ingram, Leon Ware, Cynthia Weil) - 6:00
10. "Right Back" (Ingram, Leon Ware) - 3:58
11. "Crazy" - 3:40

== Personnel ==
Musicians and vocalists

- James Ingram – lead vocals, backing vocals (1–4, 6–8, 10), keyboards (4, 7, 8, 10), bass (4, 6, 8), synthesizers (8), drums (8), synth bass (10)
- Keith Diamond – keyboards (1–8, 11), Fairlight CMI (1, 2, 4), bass (1–4, 7), drums (1–4, 6, 7, 11), synth solo (2, 4), special bottle playing (2), backing vocals (2, 7), Simmons drums (3), strings (5), rap (7), fiddle (11)
- Ned "EBN" Liben – Fairlight CMI (1, 2, 4)
- Bernard Taylor – keyboards (8), drums (8), backing vocals (8)
- Randy Waldman – keyboards (9, 10), synth solo (9), keyboard solo (10)
- Leon Ware – keyboards (10), backing vocals (10)
- Skip Anderson – acoustic piano (11), Rhodes electric piano (11)
- Clarence Brice – guitars (1, 6)
- Paul Pesco – guitars (2–4, 7, 11)
- Paul Jackson Jr. – guitars (10)
- Timmy Allen – bass (2)
- Nathan East – bass (9)
- Bob Rosa – drums (3, 11), cymbals (5)
- Ricky Lawson – drums (9)
- John Robinson – drums (10)
- Paulinho da Costa – percussion (8), wind chimes (9)
- Richard Marrero – percussion (10)
- V. Jeffrey Smith – sax solo (2), saxophones (6)
- Jerome Richardson – flute solo (8), soprano saxophone (9)
- Rahmlee Michael Davis – trumpet (8)
- Harry Kim – trumpet (8)
- El DeBarge – backing vocals (1)
- Howard Hewett – backing vocals (1, 10)
- David Pack – backing vocals (1)
- Dennis Collins – backing vocals (2)
- Lillo Thomas – backing vocals (2)
- Tawatha Agee – backing vocals (3)
- Michael Bolton – backing vocals (3)
- Sandy Farina – backing vocals (3)
- Curtis King – backing vocals (3)
- Marilyn Redfield – backing vocals (3)
- April Lang – additional vocals (4)
- Toni Smith – additional vocals (4)
- Cindy Mizelle – backing vocals (6)
- Renee Diggs – additional vocals (6)
- Michelle Gold – backing vocals (7), rap (7)
- James Smith – backing vocals (7)
- Lynn Davis – backing vocals (9)
- Maxi Anderson – backing vocals (10)
- Phillip Ingram – backing vocals (10)
- Phil Perry – backing vocals (10)

Music arrangements

- James Ingram – arrangements
- Keith Diamond – arrangements (1–7, 11)
- Leon Pendarvis – horn and string arrangements (2, 4, 11), conductor (2, 4, 11)
- Bernard Taylor – arrangements (8)
- Jeremy Lubbock – arrangements (9), string arrangements and conductor (9)
- Leon Ware – arrangements (9, 10)

Horns and strings (Tracks 2, 4, 9 & 11)

- Debbie McDuffie – horn and string contractor (2, 4, 11)
- Jules Chakin – string contractor (9)
- Lawrence Feldman, Alex Foster and Lenny Pickett – saxophones (2, 4, 11)
- Dave Bargeron and Tom Malone – trombone (2, 4, 11)
- Earl Gardner and Joe Shepley – trumpet (2, 4, 11)
- Jonathan Abramowitz, Sanford Allen, Julien Barber, Alfred Brown, Harold Coletta, Peter Dimitriades, Theodore Israel, Harold Kohan, Isadora Kohan, Jesse Levy, Louann Montesi, Kermit Moore, Gene Orloff, Noel Pointer and Marylin Wright – strings (2, 4, 11)
- Marylin Baker, Mari Botnick, Denyse Buffman, Thomas Buffman, Ronald Cooper, Assa Drori, Ernie Ehrhardt, Henry Ferber, Edward Green III, Allan Harshman, Reg Hill, Paula Hochholter, Bill Hybel, Susie Katayama, Gordon Marron, Don Palmer, Sheldon Sanov, David Schwartz, Frederick Seykora, Marshall Sosson, David Speltz, Robert Sushel, Gerard Vinci and Shari Zippert – strings (9)

Adult and children voices on "Say Hey"

- Jon Boykin, Jackie Blunt, Agbeko I. Davis, Annie Davis, Munta Ramel Davis, Keith Diamond, David Ingram, Debbie Ingram, Terry Huff, Sultan Muhammad, "Snacky" Oliver, Greg Preet, Robin Roberts, Darshone Robinson, Diane Robinson, Todd Robinson, Patrice Shaw, Danny Walters, Dalesia Walters, Nesia Walters and Gigi Weatherspoon – adults
- Moira Denson, Brandy Huff, Jennifer Ingram, Jasmine Ingram, Jason Ingram, Carlos Norland, Dana Walters, Dannon Walters and Koa Warren – children

Production

- Quincy Jones – executive producer, liner notes
- Keith Diamond – producer (1–7, 11), liner notes
- James Ingram – producer (8–10), liner notes
- Laura Chan – music contractor
- Vicki Genfan – music contractor
- Curtis King – music contractor
- Gigi Weatherspoon – music contractor
- Jeri McManus – art direction, design
- Kim Champagne – design
- Matthew Rolston – photography
- Raymond Lee – stylist

Technical credits

- Bernie Grundman – mastering at Bernie Grundman Mastering (Hollywood, California)
- Keith Diamond – recording (1–7, 11), mixing (1–7, 11)
- Bob Rosa – recording (1–8, 11), mixing (1–8, 11)
- Tommy Vicari – recording (8–10), mixing (8–10)
- James Ingram – recording (9, 10), mixing (9, 10)
- John "J.C." Convertino – additional engineer
- Ken Fink – additional engineer
- Matt Forger – additional engineer
- Acar Key – additional engineer, assistant engineer
- Ed Bruder – assistant engineer
- Fernando Kral – assistant engineer
- Laura Livingston – assistant engineer
- Ralph Sutton – assistant engineer
- Mike Webber – assistant engineer
- Jeffrey "Woody" Woodruff – assistant engineer

== Charts ==
Chart (1986)	Peak position
Australian Albums (ARIA)	100
Swedish Albums (Sverigetopplistan)	21
UK Albums (Official Charts)	72
US Billboard 200	123
US Top R&B/Hip-Hop Albums (Billboard)	37
