= Always You (James Ingram album) =

Studio album by James Ingram
- Released: May 25, 1993
- Length: 53:22
- Label: Qwest; Warner Bros.
- Producer: Thom Bell; James Ingram; Keith Thomas; Maurice White

James Ingram chronology
It's Real (1989)	Always You (1993)	Stand (In the Light) (2008)

Always You is the fourth studio album by American singer James Ingram, released on May 25, 1993, by Qwest Records. It peaked at No. 27 on the Blues & Soul Top British Soul Albums chart.

== Promotion ==
The album cut, "Someone Like You", reached number 33 on the US Billboard Adult Contemporary chart. An additional track, "I Believe in Love", a duet with Sally Yeh, written by David Foster, Linda Thompson, and Ingram and produced by Ingram and Keith Thomas, was released on the Asian version of the album.

== Critical reception ==
Professional ratings
Review scores
Source	Rating
AllMusic	3/5 stars
Dayton Daily News	3.5/4 stars
Deseret News	3/4 stars
Rolling Stone	3/5 stars

Rolling Stone's David Wild gave the album a three out of five stars rating, exclaiming: "A great popular singer who suffers from a lack of image, James Ingram is unlikely to change that position much with the release of Always You." He cited Ingram's decision to work with producers Thomas, Bell and White a "strange combo works, though." Sonia Murray of The Atlanta Journal-Constitution found that Ingram had "assembled another album ready for much airplay. Always You is consistently him. A collection of ballads and massage-like mid-tempo songs, his latest effort shows that Mr. Ingram knows what works for him and why. Thanks to his painstaking care with every lyric, even gushy cuts like "Always You" and "A Baby's Born" come off as convincing." Phyl Garland of Stereo Review wrote: "Others might shout, bark, growl, scream and rap their way through recordings, but James Ingram has such a superb voice that it's enough to simply hear him sing [...] He is presented here in tastefully fashioned romantic settings that permit him to display his irresistible way with a ballad. There is no huffing, puffing, or grunting. Instead, Ingram is permitted to cast a spell with his velvety voice as he interprets several quality songs [...] While Ingram is a masterly balladeer, this does not mean that he is technically limited. Without disrupting the mood he has created, he deftly weaves in some dazzling vocal effects a la Al Jarreau or George Benson. He does so without ever breaking his cool, and that is the mark of a real master."

Cathy Carmode of the Deseret News felt that "Ingram's new collection is a keeper because it's so listenable, not because any of the songs is particularly remarkable. Albums so consistently pleasant and enjoyable are ones that shouldn't be let go. When I want to complete a task or spend some time with a friend or sweetheart, and want some soothing, pleasant background music, I don't want to have to get up and fast forward through a song that breaks that mood. Always You is appropriate for just that sort of purpose, if not for more intent listening." Greg Simms of the Dayton Daily News remarked that Ingram's collaborators on Always You amount to "a little embellishment on this album. Indeed, helping Ingram produce a group of songs is like helping Carl Lewis run the 100 -meter dash. Ingram is a welcome throwback to the days when crooners just stepped up to the microphone and let their voices go. The idea was just to sing sweetly and let the audience appreciate a fine voice. That's what Always You is all about." Simms also added "Ingram treats his listeners right. There is no way to go wrong with Always You."

== Chart performance ==
Always You reached number 27 on the Blues & Soul Top British Soul Albums chart. In the US, the album was less successful, reaching number 74 on the Top R&B/Hip-Hop Albums.

== Track listing ==
Always You track listing
No.	Title	Writer(s)	Producer(s)	Length
1.	"Someone Like You"	James Ingram; Keith Thomas	Thomas	4:24
2.	"Let Me Love You This Way"	Dennis Morgan; Thomas	Thomas	4:14
3.	"Always You"	Alan Bergman; Marilyn Bergman; Thomas	Thomas	4:38
4.	"Treat Her Right"	Ingram; Thomas	Thomas	5:04
5.	"A Baby's Born"	Burt Bacharach; Thom Bell; John Bettis; Linda Creed; Ingram	Ingram; Bell	6:16
6.	"This Is the Night"	Bacharach; T. Bell; Bettis; Ingram	Ingram; Bell	5:05
7.	"You Never Know What You Got"	T. Bell; Leroy Bell; Creed; Ingram	Ingram; Bell	6:22
8.	"Too Much for this Heart"	Dawn Thomas	Maurice White	5:24
9.	"Sing for the Children"	Bacharach; Bettis; Ingram	Ingram; Bell	5:07
10.	"Any Kind of Love"	Bruce Roberts; Carole Bayer Sager; Ingram	Ingram; Bell	6:56
11.	"I Believe in Love (Bonus Track Asian Edition)"	David Foster; Linda Thompson; Ingram	Thomas	4:36
Total length:				53:22

== Personnel ==
Production

- Leonard Richardson – A&R
- Benny Medina – executive producer
- Thom Bell – executive producer, producer (5–7, 9, 10)
- James Ingram – executive producer, producer (5–7, 9, 10)
- Keith Thomas – producer (1–4)
- Maurice White – producer (8)
- Todd Moore – production coordinator (1–4)
- Jeri Heiden – art direction, design
- Laurie Griffin – design
- Mark Hanauer – photography
- Cecille Parker – stylist

Technical credits

- Bernie Grundman – mastering at Bernie Grundman Mastering (Hollywood, California)
- Bill Whittington – recording (1–4), mixing (1–4)
- Mick Guzauski – mixing (5–10)
- Clark Germain – recording (5–7, 9, 10)
- Paul Klingberg – recording (8)
- Todd Moore – assistant engineer (1–4)
- Mike Corbett – assistant engineer (2)
- Roy Gamble – assistant engineer (4)
- Mark Guilbeault – recording assistant (5–7, 9, 10)
- Jeff Graham – mix assistant (5–10)
- Mark Fergesen – recording assistant (8)

Performers and musicians

- James Ingram – lead vocals, backing vocals (4–6, 8, 10), keyboard programming (5–7, 9)
- Keith Thomas – keyboards (1–4), bass programming (1–4), drum programming (1, 3, 4)
- Thom Bell – keyboards (5–7, 9, 10)
- Wayne Linsey – keyboards (5–7, 9, 10), keyboard programming (5–7, 9), drum programming (10)
- Bill Meyers – keyboards (8)
- Mike McKnight – keyboard programming (8), bass programming (8)
- Jerry McPherson – guitars (1, 4)
- Paul Jackson Jr. – guitar solo (5)
- Carlos Rios – guitars (5–7, 9, 10)
- Michael Thompson – guitars (8)
- Jimmie Lee Sloas – bass samples (4)
- Larry Kempel – bass guitar (5–7, 9, 10)
- Mark Hammond – drum programming (1, 2, 4)
- Ricky Lawson – drums (5–7, 9)
- Enzo Todesco – drums (8)
- Farrell Morris – chimes (3), timpani (3)
- Lenny Castro – percussion (5–7, 9, 10)
- Gerald Albright – saxophone (8)
- The Nashville String Machine – strings (3)
- Cindy Mizelle – backing vocals (1, 2, 4)
- Chris Rodriguez – backing vocals (1, 2, 4)
- Audrey Wheeler – backing vocals (1, 2, 4)
- Bob Bailey – backing vocals (3)
- Guy Penrod – backing vocals (3)
- Mervyn Warren – backing vocals (3)
- Chris Willis – backing vocals (3)
- Alvin Chea – backing vocals (4)
- Phillip Ingram – backing vocals (5, 6)
- Carolyn Perry – backing vocals (5, 6)
- Darlene Perry – backing vocals (5, 6)
- Lori Perry – backing vocals (5, 6)
- Phil Perry – backing vocals (5, 6)
- Sharon Perry – backing vocals (5, 6)
- The Aquarian Brothers – backing vocals (7, 9)
- Maurice White – backing vocals (8)
- The Boys Choir of Harlem – backing vocals (9)
- Lynne Fiddmont-Linsey – backing vocals (10)

Music arrangements

- Keith Thomas – arrangements (1–4)
- Jeremy Lubbock – string arrangements and conductor (3)
- Thom Bell – arrangements and conductor (5–7, 9, 10)
- Bill Meyers – arrangements (8)
- Maurice White – arrangements (8)
- James Ingram – arrangements (10)

Flutes, horns and strings (Tracks 5–7, 9 & 10)

- Gary Herbig – flute (5–7, 9, 10)
- Dan Higgins – flute (5, 6, 10)
- Larry Williams – flute (7, 9)
- George Bohanon – horns (trombone) (5, 6, 10)
- Rick Culver – horns (trombone) (5, 6, 10)
- Alan Kaplan – horns (trombone) (5, 6)
- Lew McCreary – horns (trombone) (5, 6)
- Charles Loper – horns (trombone) (10)
- Bill Reichenbach Jr. – horns (trombone) (10)
- Gary Grant – horns (trumpet) (5–7, 9, 10)
- Jerry Hey – horns (trumpet) (5–7, 9, 10)
- David Duke – horns (French horn) (5, 6, 10)
- Brad Warnaar – horns (French horn) (5, 6, 10)
- Jim Atkinson – horns (French horn) (7, 9, 10)
- Gregory Williams – horns (French horn) (7, 9, 10)
- Mark Adams – horns (French horn) (10
- Gayle Levant – harp (5–7, 9, 10)
- Robert Becker – strings (5–7, 9, 10)
- Robert Brosseau – strings (5–7, 9, 10)
- Kenneth Burwood Hoy – strings (5–7, 9, 10)
- Larry Corbett – strings (5–7, 9, 10)
- Joel Derouin – strings (5–7, 9, 10)
- Bruce Dukov – strings (5–7, 9, 10)
- Henry Ferber – strings (5, 6, 10)
- Joe Goodman – strings (5–7, 9, 10)
- Diana Halprin – strings (5–7, 9, 10)
- Pat Johnson – strings (5–7, 9, 10)
- Karen Jones – strings (5–7, 9, 10)
- Suzie Katayama – strings (5–7, 9, 10)
- Janet Lakatos – strings (5–7, 9, 10)
- Michael Markman – strings (5–7, 9, 10)
- Dan Neufeld – strings (5, 6, 10)
- Sid Page – strings (5–7, 9, 10)
- Sheldon Sanov – strings (5–7, 9, 10)
- Kwihee Shamban – strings (5–7, 9, 10)
- Evan Wilson – strings (5–7, 9, 10)
- Hershel Wise – strings (5–7, 9, 10)
- Rick Gerding – strings (7, 9, 10)
- Endre Granat – strings (7, 9, 10)
- Brian Dembow – strings (10)

== Charts ==
Chart performance for Always You
Chart (1993)	Peak position
UK R&B Albums (Official Charts Company)	27
US Top R&B/Hip-Hop Albums (Billboard)	74
