= Loverboy (Billy Ocean song) =

1984 song by Billy Ocean

- Standard picture sleeve (the US release has a different front cover)

Single by Billy Ocean

from the album Suddenly
- B-side: "Nights (Feel Like Getting Down)"
- Released: 15 November 1984
- Recorded: 1984
- Genre: Dance-pop; synth-rock; arena rock
- Length: 5:15 (album version); 4:11 (single version); 3:58 (US single version); 8:08 (extended version)
- Label: Jive
- Songwriters: Keith Diamond, Billy Ocean, Robert John "Mutt" Lange
- Producers: Keith Diamond; Robert John "Mutt" Lange (exec.)

Billy Ocean singles chronology
"Caribbean Queen (No More Love on the Run)" (1984)	"Loverboy" (1984)	"Suddenly" (1985)

"Loverboy" is Billy Ocean's second single from his 1984 album, Suddenly. It was produced by Keith Diamond and reached number 2 on the US Billboard Hot 100 as well as hitting number 20 on the soul chart, and number 15 on the UK Singles Chart in February 1985. It also reached the top spot of the Hot Dance Music/Club Play chart in the US, in an extended version. The track was released on the Jive label under the catalogue reference, JIVE 80. The song was played in the first episode of the long-running BBC One medical drama Casualty on 6 September 1986.

The single was also a massive success in South Africa, reaching No. 1 on the Springbok Charts, remaining in that position for 11 of the 26 weeks it charted. It was also the No. 1 single of 1985 on that country's year-end charts.

== Music video ==
The sci-fi-themed music video was directed by Maurice Phillips and it was shot at Durdle Door in Dorset, England. While riding along a coastline on horseback, an alien traveler stops to visit a bar built inside a cave. He tries to attract the attention of a female alien inside, and after he shoots her partner with a laser, they ride off on the horse together at the end. The video is interspersed with scenes of Ocean (appearing in a pyramid hologram) performing the song.

== Track listings ==
=== 7": Jive / JS1-9284 (US) JIVE 80 (UK) ===
1. "Loverboy" - 3:58
2. "Loverboy" (Dub Mix) - 4:59

=== 12": Jive / JD1-9280 (US) ===
1. "Loverboy" (Extended Club Remix) - 8:08
2. "Loverboy" (Single Version) - 4:12
3. "Loverboy" (Dub Mix) - 4:59

=== 12": Jive / JIVE T 80 (UK - Limited Edition) ===
1. "Loverboy" (Extended Club Remix) - 8:08
2. "Nights (Feel Like Getting Down)"
3. "Loverboy" (Dub Mix) - 4:59

== Charts ==
=== Weekly charts ===
Chart (1985)	Peak position
Australia (Kent Music Report)	7
Belgium (Ultratop 50 Flanders)	3
Canadian Singles Chart	6
Danish Singles Chart	5
France (SNEP)	34
German Singles Chart	12
New Zealand (Recorded Music NZ)	7
South African Singles Chart (Springbok Radio)	1
UK Singles Chart	15
US Billboard Hot 100	2
US Billboard Hot Black Singles	20
US Billboard Hot Dance Club Play	1

=== Year-end charts ===
Chart (1985)	Position
Australia (Kent Music Report)	32
South African Singles Chart	1
US Top Pop Singles (Billboard)	28

== Notable appearances in other media ==
- The song was ranked by the "80 of the 80s" podcast as #38 of the decade.
- French electronic duo Justice sampled the song in their 2011 track Helix

== Boystar version ==
"Loverboy"

Single by Boystar
- Released: 6 October 2002
- Recorded: 2002
- Genre: Pop
- Length: 3:37
- Label: MRA Entertainment
- Songwriters: Keith Diamond, Billy Ocean, Robert John "Mutt" Lange

In 2002, Australian group "Boystar", consisting of Ian Starr, Decklyn Jaxx and Steven Childs, released a cover version of "Loverboy". It was their first and only release. it debuted at peaked at #12 on the ARIA singles chart.

=== Track listing ===
"Loverboy" was released on a 5-track CD single

1. "Loverboy" (Radio Edit) (3:37)
2. "This Ain't Love" (3:06)
3. "Loverboy" (Diego V Euro Club) (5:21)
4. "Loverboy" (DJ Nikko Dirty Club) (4:14)
5. "Loverboy" (Diego V RNB) (4:30)

=== Charts ===
Chart (2002)	Peak position
Australia (ARIA Charts)	12
