= Clopton, Northamptonshire =

Village and civil parish in England

Coordinates: 52.4121°N 0.4357°W

Clopton
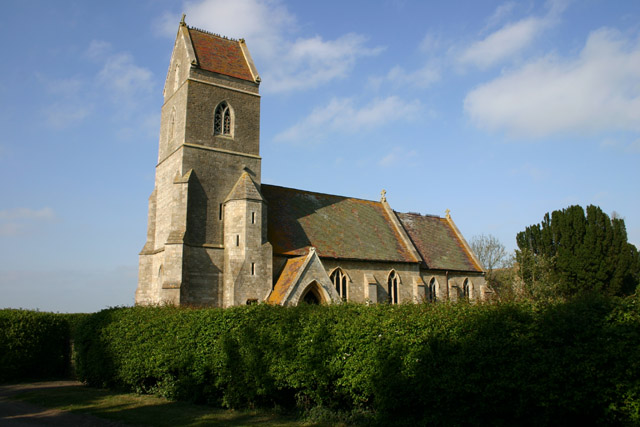
- St Peter's Church

- Location within Northamptonshire
- Population: 134
- OS grid reference: TL0680
- Unitary authority: North Northamptonshire
- Ceremonial county: Northamptonshire
- Region: East Midlands
- Country: England
- Sovereign state: United Kingdom
- Post town: Kettering
- Postcode district: NN14
- Dialling code: 01832
- Police: Northamptonshire
- Fire: Northamptonshire
- Ambulance: East Midlands
- UK Parliament: Corby and East Northamptonshire

Clopton is a small village and civil parish located in North Northamptonshire, close to the Cambridgeshire border. The village stretches along the north side of the B662 and was recorded in the Domesday Book as 'Clotone'. At the time of the 2001 census, the parish's population was 134 people. The Village Church of St Peter was built in about 1863 by Richard Armstrong.

In 1395, the noblewoman Agnes Hotot married into the Dudley family at Clopton. Before her marriage, she was known for besting a man in a lance fight; when her ailing father was unable to meet the arranged dueling challenge, Hotot took his place, disguising herself in his armour. She knocked her opponent off his horse – and then revealed her true identity. The Dudley family later created a new crest in honour of her victory.

The village is reputed to be haunted by a ghost known as Skulking Dudley, who lived in the area in the 14th century. Skulking Dudley Coppice is named after him.
