= It's Real (James Ingram album) =

Studio album by James Ingram
- Released: May 23, 1989
- Recorded: 1987–89
- Studio: Soundworks and Sigma Sound (New York City, New York ) Ocean Way Recording (Hollywood, California) Midi Madness Studio and Studio Ultimo (Los Angeles, California) Encore Studios and The Enterprise (Burbank, California)
- Genre: R&B; soul
- Length: 51:27
- Label: Qwest, Warner Bros.
- Producer: James Ingram; Thom Bell; Gene Griffin; Gerald Levert; Dennis Matkosky; Michael J. Powell; Bernard Taylor

James Ingram chronology
Never Felt So Good (1986)	It's Real (1989)	Always You (1993)

It's Real is the third full-length recording by American R&B singer-songwriter James Ingram. It was released in May 1989 on Qwest/Warner Bros. Records, and features the smash hit single "I Don't Have the Heart", which peaked at number 1 for 1 week. It also features a remake of the classic song "(You Make Me Feel Like) A Natural Woman", re-written with different lyrics and entitled "(You Make Me Feel Like) A Natural Man".

== Critical reception ==
Professional ratings
Review scores
Source	Rating
AllMusic	2/5 stars
The Boston Globe	(favourable)
The Rolling Stone Album Guide	2/5 stars

Robin Katz, reviewer of British music newspaper Music Week, left mainly favourable overlook on this album, saying that "Ingram presents his usual standard of contemporary sophisticated soul." He concluded: "Title track could be a smash and will appeal to Bobby Brown boppers while final cut is weepie in Whitney style."

== Track listing ==
Side one – It's Real Hard

1. "It's Real" (Kemp Frank, Gene Griffin, Barry Hankerson, Ingram) - 5:13
2. "I Wanna Come Back" (Marc Gordon, Gerald Levert) - 4:51
3. "Call On Me" (Ingram, Bernard Taylor) - 4:03
4. "So Fine" (Ingram, Bernard Taylor) - 4:04
5. "Love Come Down" (Gene Griffin, Ingram) - 5:40
- "Baby Be Mine" (Bell, Ingram) - 5:00 (Bonus Track (Side one, Track 6) on CD version)

Side two – It's Real Soft

1. "(You Make Me Feel Like) A Natural Man" (Gerry Goffin, Carole King, Jerry Wexler) - 5:04
2. "Love One Day at a Time" (Ingram, Monty Seward) - 4:31
3. "I Don't Have the Heart" (Jud Friedman, Allan Rich) - 4:14
4. "Someday We'll All Be Free" (Donny Hathaway, Edward Howard) - 4:10
5. "When Was the Last Time the Music Made You Cry" (Ingram, Dennis Matkosky, Kathy Wakefield) - 4:57

== Personnel ==
Credits adapted from CD release.

- James Ingram – lead vocals, backing vocals (1, 4, 5, 8), keyboards (3, 4, 10), drums (3, 4)
- Winston Johnson – keyboard programming (all tracks), Synclavier programming (all tracks)
- Dwayne Russell – keyboard programming (all tracks)
- Brian Simpson – keyboard programming (all tracks)
- Frank Stangerup – keyboard programming (all tracks)
- Teddy Riley – all instruments (1, 5), backing vocals (1, 5)
- Jim Salamone – keyboard sequencing (2)
- Bernard Taylor – keyboards (3, 4), drums (3, 4)
- Aaron Zigman – keyboards (3, 4, 6)
- Thom Bell – keyboards (6), bass (6, 9)
- Vernon Fails – keyboards (7)
- Robbie Buchanan – synthesizer programming (7)
- Monty Seward – keyboards (8), synthesizers (8), backing vocals (8)
- Jud Friedman – keyboards (9), programming (9)
- Dennis Matkosky – keyboards (11), synthesizers (11)
- Paul Jackson Jr. – guitars (3, 8, 9)
- Abraham Laboriel – bass (7, 11)
- Freddie Washington – bass (8)
- Nathan East – bass (10)
- Ricky Lawson – drums (6, 7, 9, 10)
- Jeff Porcaro – drums (8)
- Paulinho da Costa – percussion (8)
- Dan Higgins – saxophones (4)
- Larry Williams – saxophones (4)
- Gerald Albright – saxophone solo (7)
- Ernie Watts – saxophone solo (8)
- Gary Grant – trumpet (4)
- Jerry Hey – trumpet (4)
- Toots Thielemans – harmonica solo (10)
- Sephra Winters – horn and string contractor (9–11)
- Bernard Belle – backing vocals (1)
- Regina Belle – backing vocals (1)
- Marsha McClurkin – backing vocals (1)
- William Aquart Jr. – backing vocals (1)
- Gerald Levert – backing vocals (2)
- Jim Gilstrap – backing vocals (3)
- Phil Perry – backing vocals (3, 4)
- The Aquarian Singers – backing vocals (6, 9, 10)
- Bobbette Jamerson – backing vocals (7)
- Tim Johnson – backing vocals (7)
- Valerie Pinkston-Mayo – backing vocals (7)
- Carl Calwell – backing vocals (8)
- Josie James – backing vocals (8)
- Marva King – backing vocals (8)
- Kimaya Seward – backing vocals (8)

Music arrangements

- Teddy Riley – arrangements (1, 5)
- Marc Gordon – arrangements (2)
- Gerald Levert – arrangements (2)
- James Ingram – arrangements (3, 4, 6, 8–11)
- Bernard Taylor – arrangements (3, 4)
- Jerry Hey – horn arrangements (4)
- Thom Bell – arrangements and conductor (6, 9–11), horn and string arrangements (9–11)
- Vernon Fails – rhythm arrangements (7)
- Michael J. Powell – rhythm arrangements (7)
- Valerie Pinkston-Mayo – BGV arrangements (7)
- Monty Seward – arrangements (8)
- Jud Friedman – arrangements (9)
- Dennis Matkosky – arrangements (11)

=== Production ===
- James Ingram – executive producer, producer (3, 4, 6, 8–11)
- Thom Bell – executive producer, producer (6, 9–11)
- Gene Griffin – producer (1, 5)
- Gerald Levert – producer (2)
- Marc Gordon – producer (2)
- Bernard Taylor – producer (3)
- Michael J. Powell – producer (7)
- Monty Seward – producer (8)
- Dennis Matkosky – producer (11)
- Barry Hankerson – associate producer, management
- Benny Medina – associate producer
- JoAnn Tominaga – production coordinator (7), music contractor
- Yolandra Fletcher King – production coordinator (8–11), music contractor, personal assistant
- Sephra Winters – music contractor
- Kim Champange – art direction
- Jeri McManus – art direction
- Andy Engel – design
- Aaron Rapoport – photography
- Cecille Parker – stylist
- Elbert Oliver – hair, make-up
- The Midwest Group – management company

Technical credits

- Bernie Grundman – mastering at Bernie Grundman Mastering (Hollywood, California)
- Dave Way – recording (1, 5)
- Mike Tarsia – recording (2), mixing (2)
- Barney Perkins – recording (2, 7), mixing (2)
- Sidney Burton – mixing (3, 4)
- Paul Ericksen – recording (3, 4, 6, 8–11), mixing (6, 8–11)
- Winston Johnson – recording (3, 4, 6, 8–11), mixing (3, 4, 6, 8, 10, 11)
- Steve Van Arden – recording (3)
- Bob Loftus – recording (4, 6)
- Dennis Matkosky – recording (11)
- Milton Chan – additional engineer (7)
- Tony Shimkin – assistant engineer (1, 5)
- Tom Biener – assistant engineer (2–4, 6–11)
- Marty Hozenberg – assistant engineer (2–4, 6–11)
- Fred Kelly Jr. – assistant engineer (2–4, 6–11)
- David Radin – assistant engineer (2–4, 6–11)
- Mitch Zelezny – assistant engineer (2–4, 6–11)

== Charts ==
Chart (1989)	Peak position
Swedish Albums (Sverigetopplistan)	34
US Billboard 200	117
US Top R&B/Hip-Hop Albums (Billboard)	44
