= I Don't Have the Heart =

1990 single by James Ingram

Single by James Ingram

from the album It's Real
- B-side: "It's Real"
- Released: August 25, 1990
- Recorded: 1989
- Genre: Pop, R&B
- Length: 4:14 (album version); 4:35 (music video version)
- Label: Warner Bros.
- Songwriters: Allan Rich, Jud Friedman
- Producers: Thom Bell, James Ingram

James Ingram singles chronology
"The Secret Garden" (1990)	"I Don't Have the Heart" (1990)	"When Was the Last Time Music Made You Cry" (1991)

"I Don't Have the Heart"

Single by Stacy Lattisaw

from the album What You Need
- Released: 1990
- Recorded: 1989
- Genre: R&B
- Length: 4:59
- Label: Motown
- Songwriters: Allan Rich; Jud Friedman
- Producer: LeMel Humes

Stacy Lattisaw singles chronology
"Dance for You" (1989)	"I Don't Have the Heart" (1990)

"I Don't Have the Heart" is a song written by Allan Rich and Jud Friedman and recorded by American R&B recording artist James Ingram. It is Ingram's only number-one single as a solo artist on the US Billboard Hot 100, and his second number-one single overall, since the Patti Austin-featured "Baby, Come to Me", which topped the Hot 100 in 1983. Ingram received a Grammy Award nomination for Best Male Pop Vocal Performance at the 33rd Grammy Awards in 1991 for the song.

Released as the fourth single from Ingram's 1989 album It's Real, "I Don't Have the Heart" reached the top of the Billboard Hot 100 chart on October 20, 1990. The ballad remained at No. 1 for one week, and became his final Top 40 hit. Singer Stacy Lattisaw recorded the song as well, and her version was released on Motown Records at the same time as Ingram's, although it was not as commercially successful.

== Composition ==
"I Don't Have The Heart" was the first song that the duo of Allan Rich and Jud Friedman created together. Introduced by head of Peermusic Kathy Spanberger, Rich had already written the first verse and chorus of the song. Inspired by what he heard Friedman invited Rich over to his apartment in L.A. to finish the lyrics. Together they wrote the second verse and the bridge.

Friedman told Songwriting Magazine, “Allan says he’s not a poetic lyricist, and he’s not a flowery lyricist. He is very conversational, but in a good way, and that has its own poetry. It’s the poetry of reality and the poetry of life and interactions. And the thing about I Don’t Have the Heart, among many brilliant things about Allan’s idea for the song, is it’s an example of taking a phrase that’s very well known, ‘I don’t have the heart,’ and flipping it. ‘I don’t have the heart to hurt you, but I don’t have the heart to love you.’ He used it in two different ways, and that was poetic. We’ve all been there, sometimes wearing one of the shoes and sometimes wearing the other.”

== Personnel ==
- James Ingram – lead vocals, backing vocals
- Winston Johnson – keyboard programming, Synclavier programming
- Dwayne Russell – keyboard programming
- Brian Simpson – keyboard programming
- Frank Stangerup – keyboard programming
- Monty Seward – keyboards, synthesizers, backing vocals
- Paul Jackson Jr. – guitars
- Freddie Washington – bass
- Jeff Porcaro – drums
- Paulinho da Costa – percussion
- Ernie Watts – saxophone solo
- Carl Calwell – backing vocals
- Josie James – backing vocals
- Marva King – backing vocals
- Kimaya Seward – backing vocals

== Charts ==
=== Weekly charts ===
Chart (1990)	Peak position
Australia (ARIA)	78
Canada Top Singles (RPM)	28
Canada Adult Contemporary (RPM)	2
US Billboard Hot 100	1
US Adult Contemporary (Billboard)	2
US Hot R&B/Hip-Hop Songs (Billboard)	53
US Cash Box Top 100	1

=== Year-end charts ===
Chart (1990)	Position
Canada Adult Contemporary (RPM)	32
US Billboard Hot 100	36
US Cash Box Top 100	13
