= Stand (In the Light) =

Studio album by James Ingram
- Released: October 14, 2008
- Studio: Willowbrooke Studios (Franklin, TN); Rumbo Recorders, The Music Room, Look At The Lights Studio, James Gang Productions, Inc. and Minor Productions, Inc. (Los Angeles, CA); South Central Recorders (Glendale, CA); Marvin's Room (Hollywood, CA).
- Genre: R&B, Gospel
- Length: 42:39
- Label: Intering
- Producer: Keith Andes, James Ingram, Quincy Jones, Jeremy Lubbock, Rickey Minor, Walter "Junie" Morrison, Keith Thomas.

James Ingram chronology
Always You (1993)	Stand (In the Light) (2008)

Stand (In the Light) is the fifth and final album by singer-songwriter James Ingram. It was released on an independent label, Intering Records, fifteen years after his last record, "Always You".

It is notable for his cover of the song "Everything Must Change" and for featuring a remake of his duet with Michael McDonald, "Yah Mo B There". "Everything Must Change" was originally recorded by its writer Benard Ighner for the 1974 Quincy Jones album "Body Heat" and was covered by a huge variety of singers including Oleta Adams on her 1990 album Circle of One.

== Track listing ==
1. "Stand (In The Light)" (Debbie Allen, James Ingram) - 4:49
2. "Don't Let Go" (Ingram, Keith Andes, Ricky Jones) - 4:34
3. "Blessed Assurance" (Fanny Crosby, Phoebe Knapp) - 4:17
4. "Mercy" (Allen, Ingram) - 3:53
5. "Beneath The Snow" (Jeremy Lubbock) - 3:58
6. "Everything Must Change" (Bernard Ighner) - 4:50
7. "Yah Mo B There" (Ingram, Quincy Jones, Michael McDonald, Rod Temperton) - 4:31
8. "Everlast" (Ingram, Leon Ware) - 5:14
9. "No Place Like Home" (Ingram, Keith Thomas) - 3:32
10. "For All We Know" (John Frederick Coots, Sam M. Lewis) - 3:01

== Personnel ==
- James Ingram – lead vocals, arrangements (1, 4, 7, 8), keyboards (4), programming (4), instruments (4), synthesizers (7, 8), backing vocals (7)
- Keith Thomas – keyboards (1, 3, 9, 10), programming (1, 3, 9), instruments (1, 3, 9, 10), arrangements (1, 9, 10)
- Keith Andes – programming, instruments and arrangements (2)
- Jeremy Lubbock – keyboards, programming, instruments and arrangements (5)
- Walter "Junie" Morrison – all instruments (6)
- Tim Heinz – synthesizers (6)
- Michael Boddicker – synthesizers (7)
- Michael McDonald – synthesizers (7), lead and backing vocals (7), arrangements (7)
- Rod Temperton – synthesizers (7), arrangements (7)
- David Delhomme – keyboards (8)
- Greg Moore – guitars (4)
- Paul Jackson Jr. – guitars (8)
- Will Owsley – guitars (9)
- Rickey Minor – bass (8), arrangements (8)
- John Robinson – drums (7)
- Teddy Campbell – drums (8)
- Paulinho da Costa – percussion (7)
- Kevin Ricard – percussion (8)
- Hubert Laws – alto flute (8)
- Jasmine Ingram – backing vocals (4)
- Quincy Jones – African voices (7), arrangements (7)

Production

- Executive Producers – Debbie Ingram and Cathy Hughes
- Producers – Keith Thomas (Tracks 1, 3, 9 & 10); Keith Andes (Track 2); James Ingram (Tracks 4 & 8); Jeremy Lubbock (Track 5); Walter "Junie" Morrison (Track 6); Quincy Jones (Track 7); Rickey Minor (Track 8).
- Production Coordination – Darryl Bush (Tracks 1, 3, 9 & 10); Robert Fields (Track 2); Jasmine Ingram (Track 4); Rob Liefer (Track 8).
- Engineers – Bill Whittington (Tracks 1, 3, 9 & 10); Keith Andes (Track 2 & 4); Jeremy Lubbock and Sander Selover (Track 5); Ross Pallone (Track 6); Bruce Swedien (Track 7); James Ingram, Ricky Minor and Dirk Vanoucek (Track 8).
- Assistant Engineers on Track 7 – Steve Bates, Rick Butz, Mark Ettel and Greg Laney.
- Mixing – Bill Whittington (Tracks 1, 3, 9 & 10); Keith Andes (Track 2 & 4); Jeremy Lubbock and Sander Selover (Track 5); Ross Pallone (Track 6); Bruce Swedien (Track 7); Dave Reitzas (Track 8).
- Pro Tools and MIDI Technicians – Ryan Kyzar and Dirk Vanoucek
- Mastered by Chris Bellman at Bernie Grundman Mastering (Hollywood, CA).
- Product Manager – Jasmine Ingram
- Art Direction and Design – Carlos Zaldivar
- Photography – Keith Thomas

== Charts ==
Chart (2008)	Peak position
US Top Gospel Albums (Billboard)	18
US Top R&B/Hip-Hop Albums (Billboard)	63
