= Dwarf Hotot =

Breed of rabbit

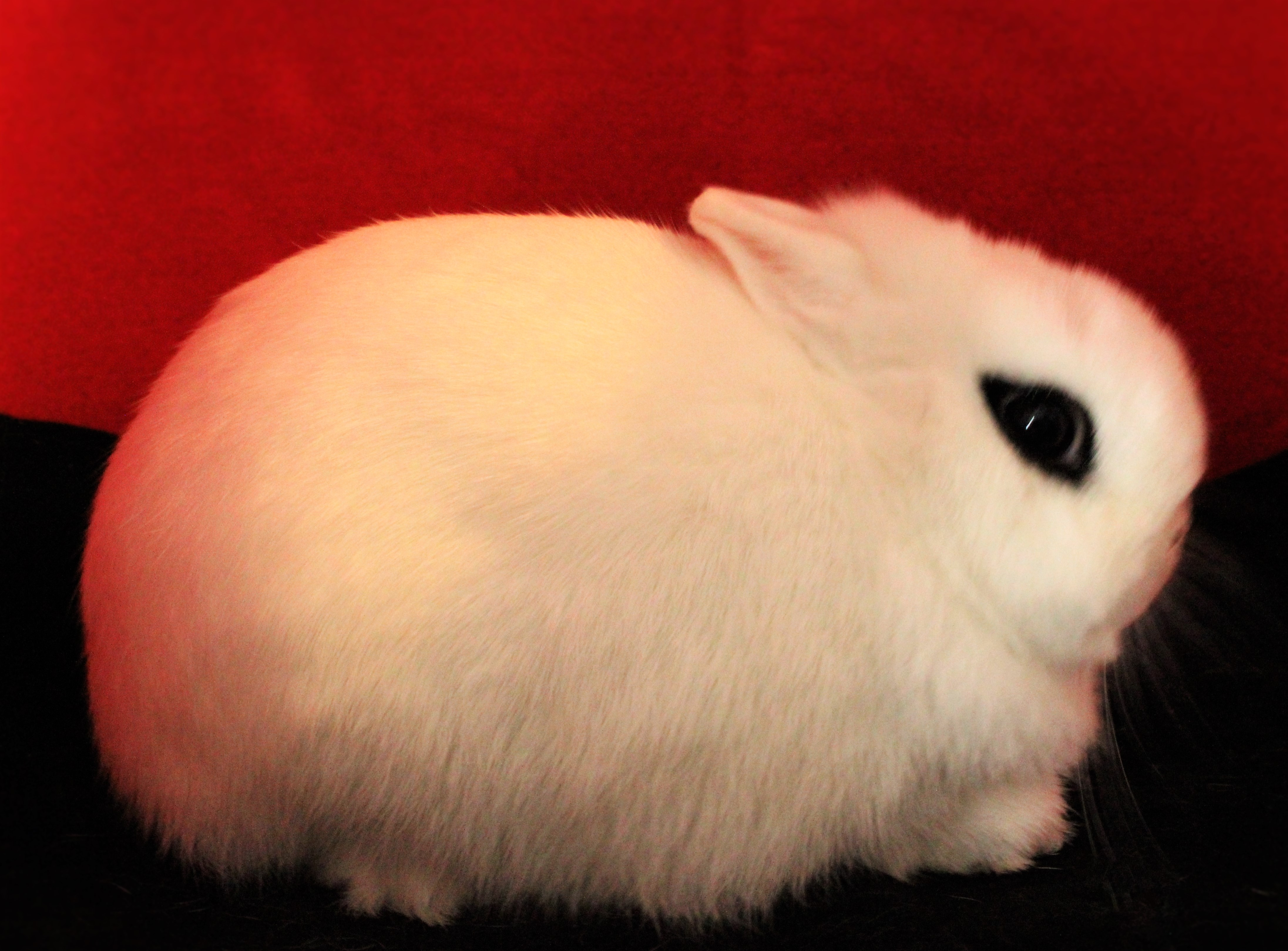
- Country of origin: France
- Use: Show, pets

Traits
- Face color: Black, Blue or Chocolate eyebands (Lilac is also possible, however not recognized by the American Rabbit Breeder's Association)
- Color: White

Dwarf Hotot is a breed of domestic rabbit characterized by an entirely white coat, except for a circle of another color around each eye.

== History ==
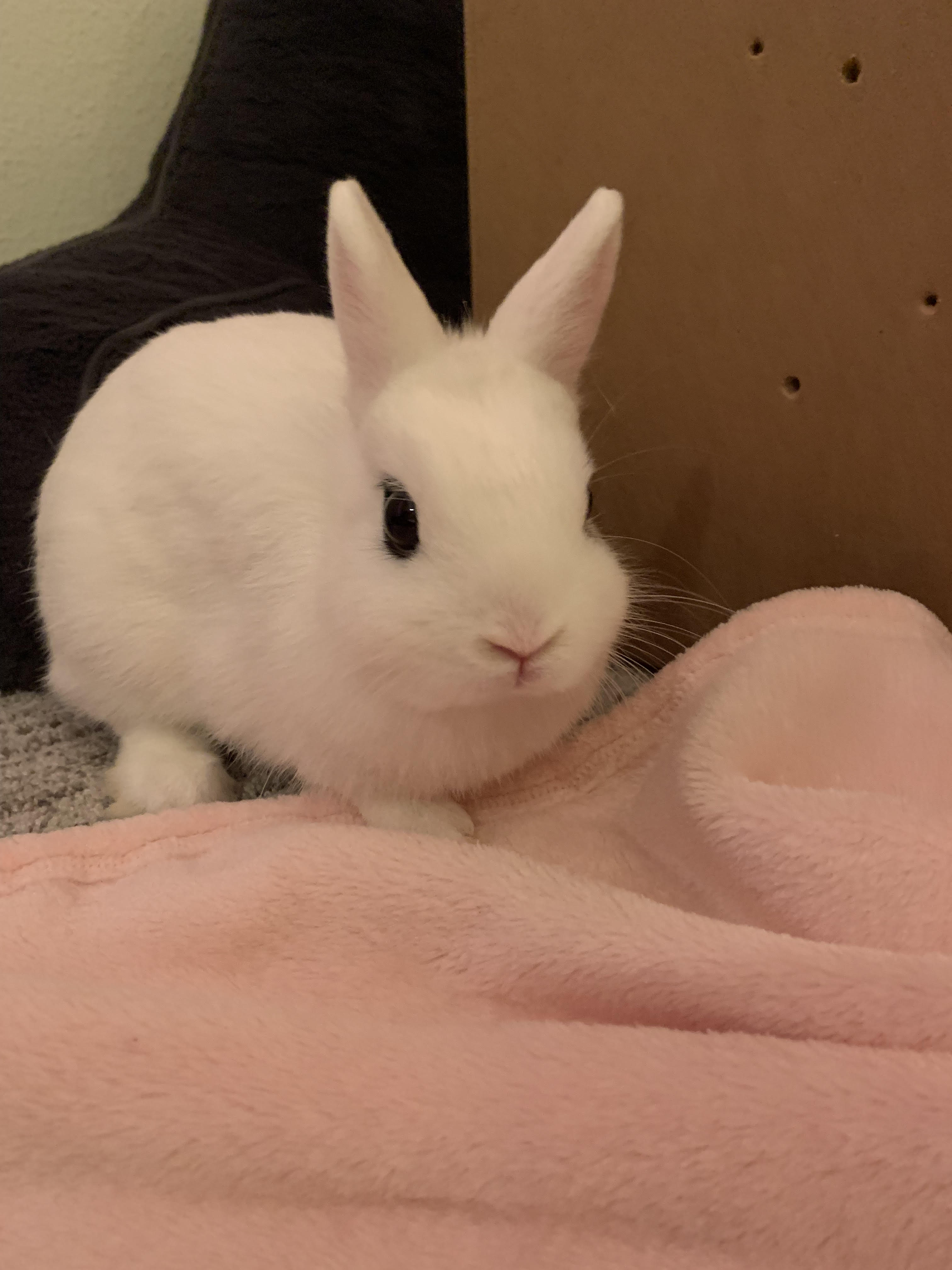
A Dwarf Hotot, 5 months old

The Dwarf Hotot is one of the more recent breeds to be recognized by the ARBA, gaining acceptance in 1983. It has never been without a strong following, but also has never been among the most popular breeds.

The much larger Blanc de Hotot was produced in the early 1900s in an effort to produce a black-eyed white rabbit for meat and fur. In that era, large rabbits were valued for their commercial value. But in later years, big bunnies went out of style and people started pursuing dwarf breeds.

In the 1970s, one breeder in East Germany and one in West Germany started working on a Dwarf Hotot, completely independent of one another. One crossed a Ruby-Eyed White Netherland Dwarf to a Blanc de Hotot; the other didn't use a standard Hotot at all, but crossed a black Netherland Dwarf to a Dutch and bred out markings until only the eyebands remained. The two strains were eventually united in 1979 to produce the breed known today.

The Dwarf Hotot was imported to the United States in 1980 by Elizabeth Forstinger, a rabbit breeder also known for her work in importing and distributing the Holland Lop throughout the country. Forstinger bred the Dwarf Hotot further, eliminating blue and marbled eye colors from the breed, and brought several Dwarf Hotots to show at ARBA conventions each year until they were officially accepted as separate from the Netherland Dwarf in 1984.

The breed is of compact type and has a gentle rollback coat. Unlike the Polish, which as similar body type, the shoulders are supposed to be as wide as the hips, and not show any taper. The head set is not as high on the shoulders as that of a Netherland Dwarf, but should not rest on the table either. The head is bold and broad. Ears are carried in an upright V shape, and are disqualified if over 2 ¾ inches in length. The eyes are encircled with narrow bands of colored fur. Ideal eyeband width equals the thickness of two pennies, and the bands of color are even all around the eye. Weak or streaky eyebands are faulted, but a complete break in the band is disqualified.

For many years, the only accepted variety was white with black eyebands. In the year 2006, chocolate banded Dwarf Hotots were accepted by the ARBA. Blue banded were accepted in 2020. The black, blue and chocolate banded bunnies are shown together.

The Dwarf Hotot is strictly a fancy breed. At 3 pounds max, they are too small to be of commercial value.

== See also ==
- List of rabbit breeds
