= Walter Hotot =

English politician

Walter Hotot (fl. 1390) of Exton, Devon, was an English politician.

He was a member (MP) of the parliament of England for Totnes in January 1390.
