= CaVa CaVa =

British new wave pop group

- Origin: Bournemouth, United Kingdom
- Genres: New wave
- Labels: Regard Records
- Past members: Steven Parris; Richard Hixson; Jonathan Hallett; Derek Ritchie; Paul Darville
- Pat Davey; David Parsons; Marc Ford

CaVa CaVa were a short-lived English new wave group, best known for their 1982 single "Where's Romeo?".

== History ==
The band was formed in 1980 by singer/songwriter Steven Parris, who came up with the name CaVa CaVa while flicking through a foreign phrase dictionary; Radio 1 Breakfast disc jockey Peter Powell heard them at a Bournemouth night-club residency in 1981, and, after he brought them to London for a radio session, Regard Records, a new label which had had success with Haysi Fantayzee, signed the group to a deal.

Regard had high enough hopes to spend £1,000 on a Fiorucci t-shirt for Parris, and secure the band as guests all morning on the BBC children's programme Saturday Superstore in October 1982. However, the band's first single, "Where's Romeo", missed the top 40 after distribution problems prevented singles reaching the shops. A second single brushed the charts and, by the time the third single was released, guitarist Richard Hixson and drummer Derek Ritchie (who had replaced original drummer Dave Parsons just before the band signed to Regard) had left.

The final straw was self-titled album Cava Cava missing the chart entirely, although the band had an unexpected posthumous success as "Where's Romeo" reached number 35 in the Japanese chart in October 1983. Darville and Hixson later reunited in the group Shoot The Moon.

== Discography ==
=== Albums ===
- CaVa CaVa (1983)

=== Singles ===
Year	Title	UK Peak	Album
1982	"Where's Romeo?"	No. 49	CaVa CaVa
1983	"Brother Bright"	No. 65	CaVa CaVa
1983	"Burning Boy"	–	CaVa CaVa
