= James Ingram =

American singer, songwriter, and record producer (1952–2019)

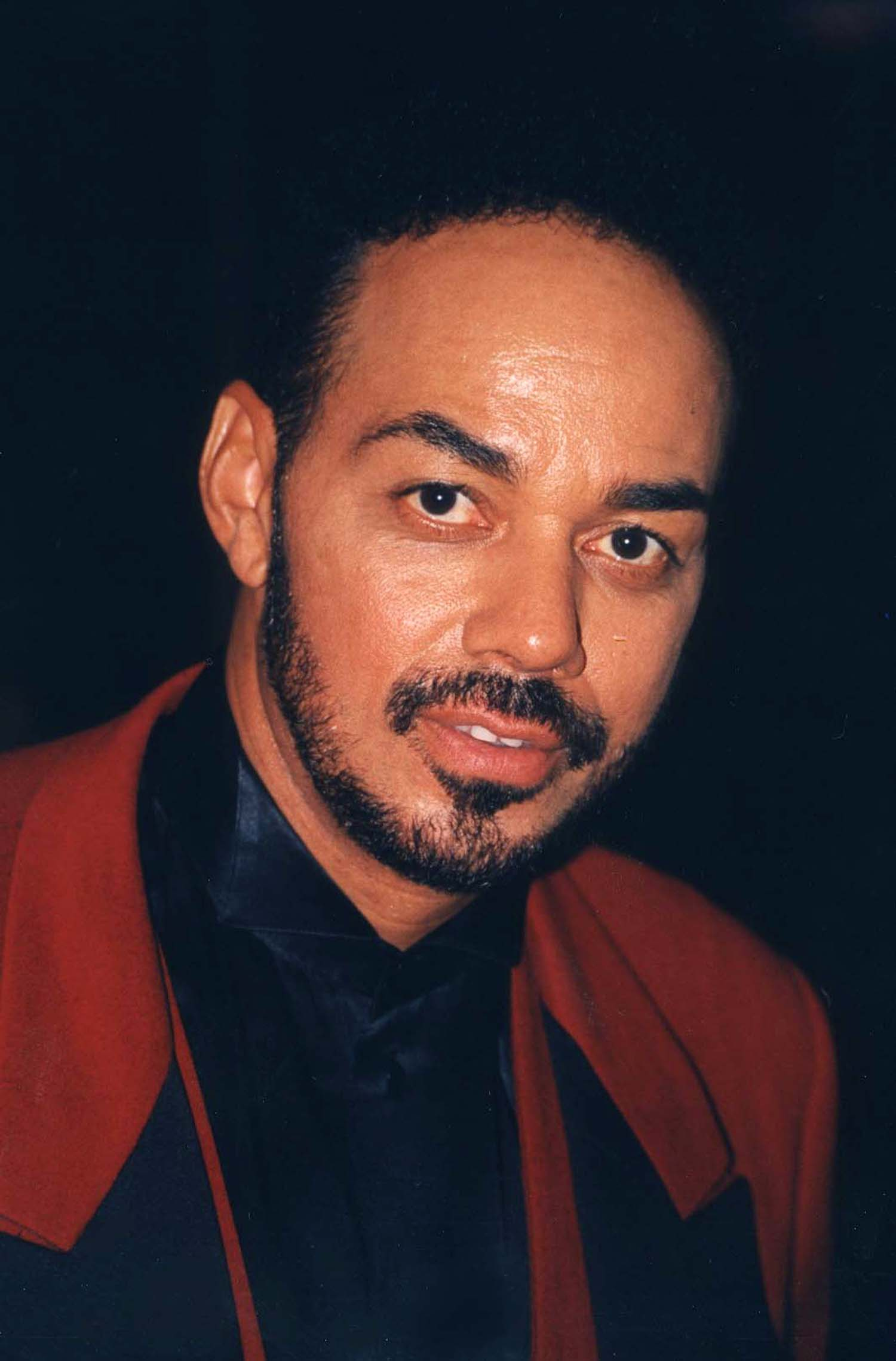
- Ingram in 1998
- Born: James Edward Ingram; February 16, 1952; Akron, Ohio, U.S.
- Died: January 29, 2019 (aged 66); Los Angeles, California, U.S.
- Resting place: Forest Lawn Memorial Park, Hollywood Hills, California, U.S.
- Occupations: Singer; songwriter; record producer
- Years active: 1971–2019
- Spouse: Debra Robinson (m. 1975)
- Relatives: Phillip Ingram (brother)
- Musical career
- Origin: Los Angeles, California, U.S.
- Genres: R&B; pop; soul; soft rock; smooth jazz
- Instruments: Vocals; keyboards
- Labels: Qwest; Intering; Warner Bros.
- Website: jamesingramsmusic.com

James Edward Ingram (February 16, 1952 – January 29, 2019) was an American singer, songwriter and record producer. He was a two-time Grammy Award-winner and a two-time Academy Award nominee for Best Original Song. After beginning his career in 1973, Ingram charted eight top 40 hits on the U.S. Billboard Hot 100 chart from the early 1980s until the early 1990s, as well as thirteen top 40 hits on the Hot R&B/Hip-Hop Songs chart. In addition, he charted 20 hits on the Adult Contemporary chart (including two number-ones). He had two number-one singles on the Hot 100: the first, a duet with fellow R&B artist Patti Austin, 1982's "Baby, Come to Me" topped the U.S. pop chart in 1983; "I Don't Have the Heart", which became his second number-one in 1990, was his only number-one as a solo artist.

In between these hits, he also recorded the song "Somewhere Out There" with fellow recording artist Linda Ronstadt for the animated film An American Tail. The song and the music video both became hits. Ingram co-wrote "The Day I Fall in Love", from the motion picture Beethoven's 2nd (1993), and singer Patty Smyth's "Look What Love Has Done", from the motion picture Junior (1994), which earned him nominations for Best Original Song from the Oscars, Golden Globes, and Grammy Awards in 1994 and 1995.

== Early life ==
Ingram was born in Akron, Ohio, where he attended Akron's East High School and received a track scholarship to the University of Akron. Subsequently, he moved to Los Angeles and played with the band Revelation Funk, which made an appearance in the Rudy Ray Moore film Dolemite. He also later played keyboards for Ray Charles before becoming famous. James Ingram received his first publishing deal with 20th Century Fox publishing company, which is where he sang the $50 demo for "Just Once".

== Career ==
Ingram provided the vocals to "Just Once" and "One Hundred Ways" on Quincy Jones's 1981 album The Dude, which earned Ingram triple Grammy nominations, including Best New Artist. "One Hundred Ways" won him the Grammy Award for Best Male R&B Vocal Performance for his work. On December 11, 1981, Ingram appeared as a guest on the Canadian comedy series SCTV (which aired on NBC), singing "Just Once". Ingram's debut album, It's Your Night, was released in 1983 and included the ballad "There's No Easy Way". He worked with other notable artists such as Donna Summer, Ray Charles, Anita Baker, Viktor Lazlo, Nancy Wilson, Natalie Cole, Kim Carnes, and Kenny Rogers. In October 1990, he scored a No. 1 hit on the Billboard Hot 100 with the love ballad "I Don't Have the Heart", from his It's Real album.

In 1984, Ingram received three additional Grammy nominations: "How Do You Keep the Music Playing?" (his second duet with recording artist Patti Austin), for Best Pop Performance by a Duo or Group with Vocals; the US Top 10 single, "P.Y.T. (Pretty Young Thing)" for Michael Jackson, which Ingram and Quincy Jones co-wrote, for Best R&B Song; and the track "Party Animal" for Best Male R&B Vocal Performance. In early 1985, he was nominated for his debut album (It's Your Night) for Best Male R&B Vocal Performance, and for its single, "Yah Mo B There" (a duet with fellow R&B musician Michael McDonald), for Best R&B Song and Best R&B Performance by a Duo or Group, and won the latter.

Ingram is perhaps best known for his hit collaborations with other vocalists. He scored a No. 1 hit on the Hot 100 chart in February 1983 with Patti Austin on the duet "Baby, Come to Me", a song made popular on TV's General Hospital. A second Austin–Ingram duet, "How Do You Keep the Music Playing?", was featured in the movie Best Friends (1982) and earned an Oscar nomination. In 1984, he teamed up with Kenny Rogers and Kim Carnes for the Top 40 ballad "What About Me?" In 1985, Ingram won a Grammy Award for "Yah Mo B There", a duet with Michael McDonald, and participated in the charity project "We Are the World".

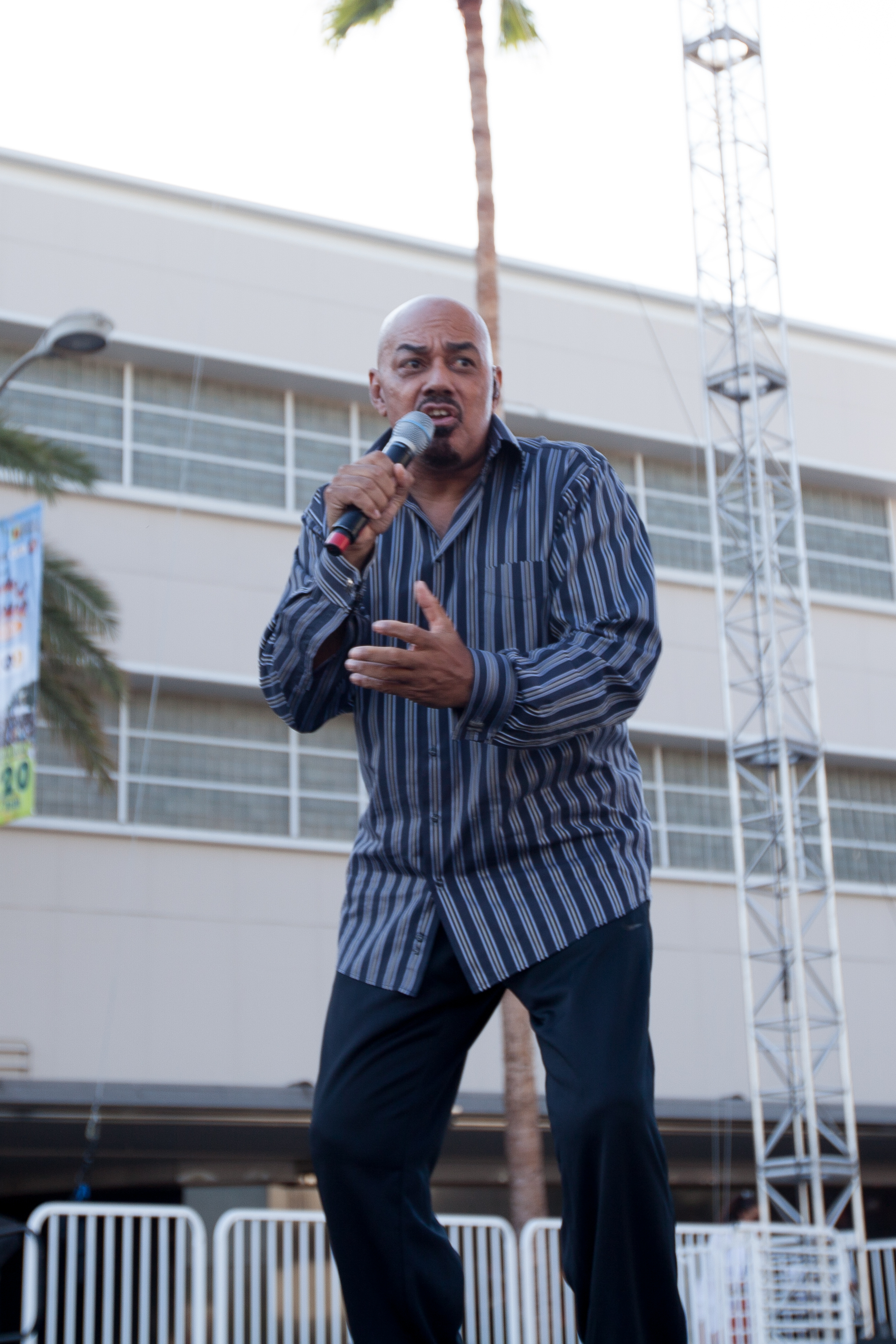
Ingram performing in 2012

Ingram teamed with American vocalist Linda Ronstadt and had a million-selling No. 2 hit in the U.S. and a Top 10 U.K. hit in 1987 with "Somewhere Out There", the theme from the animated feature film An American Tail. The song was awarded the 1987 Grammy Award for Song of the Year. It also received Academy Award and Golden Globe nominations. It was one of the last million-selling Gold-certified 45 RPM singles to be issued by the RIAA.

In the 1990s, Ingram's highest-profile team-up came again with Quincy Jones, on the song "The Secret Garden". This song also featured vocals by Barry White, El DeBarge, and Al B. Sure!. Soundtrack songs were popular for Ingram in the 1990s. From the movie Sarafina! came "One More Time", and from City Slickers came "Where Did My Heart Go?" In 1991, he and Melissa Manchester performed the song "The Brightest Star" in the animated Christmas film Precious Moments Timmy's Gift. In 1993, they performed the song again in the film's sequel Precious Moments Timmy's Special Delivery. Ingram's 1994 composition "The Day I Fall in Love", a duet with Dolly Parton, was the theme song for the movie Beethoven's 2nd and was nominated for an Academy Award for Best Original Song. Ingram and Parton performed the song live on the Oscar broadcast. In 1997, he and Carnie Wilson co-wrote the song "Our Time Has Come" and lent it to the animated film Cats Don't Dance.

During the summer of 2004, Ingram participated in the U.S. television reality show Celebrity Duets as a duet partner. The show combined professional vocalists, of various musical genres, with entertainers of different backgrounds in a weekly elimination competition. In 2006, Ingram and neo-soul singer Angie Stone teamed up on "My People". In 2011, Ingram joined Cliff Richard's list of special guest performers on his Soulicious Tour performing at various UK venues during November. He sang two songs from the album with Richard, as well a solo of "Just Once". In 2012, Ingram appeared as himself in the ABC television show Suburgatory, in the episode "The Motherload". Also in 2012, he was a guest vocalist at Debbie Allen's October 13 live show at the corner of Crenshaw Blvd. and Martin Luther King Blvd. celebrating the arrival of the Space Shuttle Endeavour, singing R. Kelly's "I Believe I Can Fly".

== Death ==
Ingram died of brain cancer in Los Angeles on January 29, 2019, at the age of 66.

== Discography ==
=== Studio albums ===
List of studio albums, with selected chart positions
Title	Album details	Peak chart positions					Certifications
Title	Album details	US	US R&B	US Gospel	AUS	UK	Certifications
It's Your Night	Released: 1983; Label: Qwest/Warner Bros.	46	10	—	—	25	RIAA: Gold
Never Felt So Good	Released: 1986; Label: Qwest/Warner Bros.	123	37	—	100	72	
It's Real	Released: 1989; Label: Qwest/Warner Bros.	117	44	—	99	—	
Always You	Released: 1993; Label: Qwest/Warner Bros.	—	74	—	195	—	
Stand	Released: 2008; Label: Intering	—	63	18	—	—	
"—" denotes a recording that did not chart or was not released in that territory.

=== Compilation albums ===
List of compilation albums, with selected chart positions
Title	Album details	Peak chart positions			Certifications
Title	Album details	US	US R&B	AUS	Certifications
Greatest Hits: The Power of Great Music	Released: 1991; Label: Qwest/Warner Bros.	168	—	158	RIAA: Gold
Forever More (Love Songs, Hits & Duets)	Released: 1999; Label: Private Music	165	94	—	—
"—" denotes a recording that did not chart or was not released in that territory.

=== Singles ===
List of singles, with selected chart positions
Title	Year	Peak chart positions							Certifications	Album
Title	Year	US	US R&B	US A/C	AUS	CA	CA A/C	UK	Certifications	Album
"Just Once" (with Quincy Jones)	1981	17	11	7	—	—	—	—	—	The Dude
"One Hundred Ways" (with Quincy Jones)	1981	14	10	5	—	43	7	—	—	The Dude
"Baby, Come to Me" (with Patti Austin)	1982	1	9	1	38	3	20	11	RIAA: Gold	Every Home Should Have One
"How Do You Keep the Music Playing?" (with Patti Austin)	1983	45	6	5	—	—	5	—	—	It's Your Night
"Party Animal"	1983	—	21	—	—	—	—	—	—	It's Your Night
"Yah Mo B There" (with Michael McDonald)	1983	19	5	—	—	12	—	12	—	It's Your Night
"There's No Easy Way"	1984	58	14	7	—	—	—	-	—	It's Your Night
"She Loves Me (The Best That I Can Be)"	1984	—	59	19	—	—	—	—	—	It's Your Night
"What About Me?" (with Kenny Rogers & Kim Carnes)	1984	15	57	1	—	18	1	92	—	What About Me?
"It's Your Night"	1985	—	—	—	—	—	—	25	—	It's Your Night
"America (The Dream Goes On)" (with John Williams and the Boston Pops Orchestra)	1985	—	—	—	—	—	—	—	—	Boston Pops: America, The Dream Goes On
"Always"	1986	—	27	—	—	—	—	—	—	Never Felt So Good
"I Just Can't Let Go" (with David Pack & Michael McDonald)	1986	—	—	13	—	—	—	—	—	Anywhere You Go
"Never Felt So Good"	1986	—	86	—	—	—	—	—	—	Never Felt So Good
"Somewhere Out There" (with Linda Ronstadt)	1986	2	—	4	31	2	2	8	RIAA: Gold	An American Tail
"Better Way"	1987	—	66	40	98	—	—	—	—	Beverly Hills Cop II: The Motion Picture Soundtrack Album
"It's Real"	1989	—	8	—	—	—	—	83	—	It's Real
"I Wanna Come Back"	1989	—	18	—	—	—	—	—	—	It's Real
"(You Make Me Feel Like) A Natural Man"	1989	—	30	—	—	—	—	—	—	It's Real
"The Secret Garden (Sweet Seduction Suite)" (with Quincy Jones feat. Al B. Sure!, El DeBarge and Barry White)	1990	31	1	26	—	—	—	67	—	Back on the Block
"I Don't Have the Heart"	1990	1	53	2	78	28	2	—	—	It's Real
"When Was the Last Time the Music Made You Cry"	1990	—	81	29	—	—	—	—	—	It's Real
"Where Did My Heart Go"	1991	—	—	23	184	—	—	—	—	City Slickers: Original Motion Picture Soundtrack
"Get Ready"	1991	—	59	—	—	—	—	—	—	The Greatest Hits: The Power of Great Music
"Someone Like You"	1993	—	—	34	—	—	—	—	—	Always You
"The Day I Fall in Love" (with Dolly Parton)	1994	—	—	36	—	—	—	64	—	Beethoven's 2nd: Music from the Original Motion Picture Soundtrack
"I Don't Want to Be Alone for Christmas (Unless I'm Alone with You)"	1994	—	—	—	—	—	—	—	—	A Very Merry Chipmunk
"When You Love Someone" (with Anita Baker)	1995	—	71	39	—	—	43	—	—	Forget Paris: The Original Motion Picture Soundtrack
"Give Me Forever (I Do)" (with John Tesh)	1998	66	—	5	—	—	—	—	—	Grand Passion
"Forever More (I'll Be the One)" (with John Tesh)	1999	—	—	12	—	—	—	—	—	One World
"—" denotes a recording that did not chart or was not released in that territory.

=== Other appearances ===
Appearances of James Ingram on other artists' songs
Title	Year	Album	Artist
"Mystery of Love"	1982	Donna Summer	Donna Summer
"We Are the World"	1985	We Are the World	USA for Africa
"One More Time"	1992	Sarafina! The Sound of Freedom: Music from the Motion Picture	
"Just Once" (live version)	1994	Grammy's Greatest Moments Volume III	
"Wish You Were Here"	1997	If I Had My Way	Nancy Wilson
"Our Time Has Come"	1997	Cats Don't Dance: Original Motion Picture Soundtrack	Carnie Wilson
"What U Give U Get Back"	1999	Eye II Eye	Scorpions
"What About Me?"	2000	Kenny Rogers & Friends	Kenny Rogers
"One Gift"	2001	In the Spirit: A Christmas Album	Michael McDonald
"If You Really Need Me Now"	2001	On the Way to Love	Patti Austin

== Filmography ==
- 1981 - SCTV "3D House of Beef" sketch, as himself
- 1997: The Fearless Four as Buster (voice – English version)
- 2012: Suburgatory; himself (episode: "The Motherload")

== Awards and nominations ==
=== Grammy Awards ===
Ingram has won two Grammy Awards out of fourteen nominations.

Year	Nominated work	Category	Result
1982	James Ingram	Best New Artist	Nominated
1982	"Just Once"	Best Male Pop Vocal Performance	Nominated
1982	"One Hundred Ways"	Best Male R&B Vocal Performance	Won
1984	"How You Do Keep the Music Playing?" (with Patti Austin)	Best Pop Performance by a Duo or Group with Vocals	Nominated
1984	"P.Y.T. (Pretty Young Thing)"	Best R&B Song (songwriting with Quincy Jones)	Nominated
1984	"Party Animal"	Best Male R&B Vocal Performance	Nominated
1985	"Yah Mo B There" (with Michael McDonald)	Best R&B Performance by a Duo or Group with Vocals	Won
1985	"Yah Mo B There" (with Michael McDonald)	Best R&B Song (songwriting with Quincy Jones, Rod Temperton and Michael McDonald)	Nominated
1985	It's Your Night	Best Male R&B Vocal Performance	Nominated
1988	"Somewhere Out There" (with Linda Ronstadt)	Best Pop Performance by a Duo or Group with Vocals	Nominated
1991	"I Don't Have the Heart"	Best Male Pop Vocal Performance	Nominated
1991	"The Secret Garden" (with Al B. Sure, El DeBarge and Barry White)	Best R&B Performance by a Duo or Group with Vocals	Nominated
1995	"The Day I Fall in Love"	Best Song Written for Visual Media (songwriting with Cliff Magness and Carole Bayer Sager)	Nominated
1996	"When You Love Someone" (with Anita Baker)	Best Pop Collaboration with Vocals	Nominated

=== Academy Award nominations ===
- 1994: Best Original Song for "The Day I Fall in Love" from the motion picture Beethoven's 2nd (shared with Cliff Magness and Carole Bayer Sager)
- 1995: Best Original Song for "Look What Love Has Done" the motion picture Junior (shared with Carole Bayer Sager, James Newton Howard, and Patty Smyth)

=== Golden Globe Award nominations ===
- 1994: Best Original Song for "The Day I Fall in Love" (shared with Cliff Magness and Carole Bayer Sager)
- 1995: Best Original Song for "Look What Love Has Done" (shared with Carole Bayer Sager, James Newton Howard, and Patty Smyth)
