= Hotot (program) =

Micro-blogging desktop client

- Preview release: 0.9.8.14 / June 4, 2012
- Repository: github.com/lyricat/Hotot
- Written in: Python
- Operating system: Linux, Windows, OS X, ChromiumOS
- Available in: English
- Type: Social networking client
- License: GPL version 3
- Website: http://hotot.org

Hotot was a micro-blogging desktop client for Twitter as well as Statusnet/GNUsocial, developed in Python as an open source application. Despite the fact that it is still in its early stages of development, as stated on the official website, it has succeeded to achieve the "Best Linux Twitter Client" in a poll published on WebUpd8.org against four Linux Twitter clients; namely Gwibber, Pino, Turpial, and Choqok with 1021 voters. On February 9, 2014, it was announced that the client is being discontinued.
