= Caribbean Queen (No More Love on the Run) =

- 1984 UK vinyl rerelease picture sleeve (also released that year as "European Queen (No More Love on the Run)")

Single by Billy Ocean

from the album Suddenly
- B-side: "European Queen (No More Love on the Run)"; "Caribbean Queen (Instrumental)" (US alternative)
- Released: 18 July 1984
- Recorded: 1983
- Genre: Post-disco; funk-pop; electro-funk; R&B
- Length: 7:52 (album version); 4:06 (edit); 3:42 (single version); 8:14 (extended mix)
- Label: Jive
- Songwriters: Billy Ocean; Keith Diamond
- Producer: Keith Diamond

Billy Ocean singles chronology
"European Queen" (1984)	"Caribbean Queen (No More Love on the Run)" (1984)	"Loverboy" (1984)

Official video
- "Caribbean Queen (No More Love on the Run)" on YouTube

"Caribbean Queen (No More Love on the Run)" (Note: Also initially released as "European Queen (No More Love on the Run)" or simply "Caribbean Queen") is a 1984 song by Trinidadian-British singer Billy Ocean. Co-written and produced by Keith Diamond, it climbed to number one on both the US Billboard Hot 100 chart and the Billboard Black Singles chart, and number six on the UK Singles Chart. The song won Ocean the 1985 Grammy Award for Best Male R&B Vocal Performance, making him the first British artist to win in that category.

The song is written and recorded in the key of D minor. The saxophone solo is played by Vernon Jeffrey Smith.

== History ==
The song was initially released in the UK as "European Queen" in May 1984, but it did not achieve success. As suggested by the record company, it was re-recorded for different parts of the world—resulting in the versions "Caribbean Queen" and "African Queen".

In the US, the song was released under the title "Caribbean Queen (No More Love on the Run)". It entered the Billboard Hot 100 at number 85 on the chart dated 11 August 1984. Twelve weeks later it hit number one and stayed at the top of the chart for two consecutive weeks. The song charted for 26 weeks. This version then also achieved success in Europe:

The song was released in Europe as "European Queen" and nobody was interested in it. When we changed the name to "Caribbean Queen" and released it in the U. S., it took off and started snowballing and they started playing it in Europe. I guess it had more appeal as "Caribbean Queen" because Europe conjures up a vision of rain and snow and cold, but Caribbean sounds like sunshine and blue skies. It's much more exotic.

— Billy Ocean

== Charts ==
=== "Caribbean Queen (No More Love on the Run)" ===
==== Weekly charts ====
Weekly chart performance for "Caribbean Queen (No More Love on the Run)"
Chart (1984–1985)	Peak position
Australia (Kent Music Report)	2
Canada Retail Singles (The Record)	3
Canada Adult Contemporary (RPM)	8
Canada Top Singles (RPM)	1
France (SNEP)	23
Guatemala (UPI)	1
Ireland (IRMA)	7
New Zealand (Recorded Music NZ)	1
UK Singles (Official Charts)	6
US Billboard Hot 100	1
US Billboard Adult Contemporary	7
US Billboard Hot Black Singles	1
US Billboard Hot Dance Club Play	1
US Cash Box	2

==== Year-end charts ====
Year-end chart performance for "Caribbean Queen (No More Love on the Run)"
Chart (1984)	Rank
Australia (Kent Music Report)	76
Canada Top Singles (RPM)	30
US Billboard Hot 100	51
US Cash Box	22

=== "African Queen" ===
Weekly chart performance for "African Queen"
Chart (1984)	Peak position
South Africa (Springbok Radio)	7

=== "European Queen (No More Love on the Run)" ===
==== Weekly charts ====
Weekly chart performance for "European Queen (No More Love on the Run)"
Chart (1984–1985)	Peak position
Austria (Ö3 Austria Top 40)	20
Belgium (Ultratop 50 Flanders)	21
Netherlands (Dutch Top 40)	15
Netherlands (Single Top 100)	21
Switzerland (Schweizer Hitparade)	3
UK Singles (Official Charts)	82
West Germany (GfK)	2

==== Year-end charts ====
1984 year-end chart performance for "European Queen (No More Love on the Run)"
Chart (1984)	Rank
Netherlands (Dutch Top 40)	98
Netherlands (Single Top 100)	100

1985 year-end chart performance for "European Queen (No More Love on the Run)"
Chart (1985)	Rank
West Germany (Official German Charts)	51

== Certifications and sales ==
Certifications and sales for "Caribbean Queen (No More Love on the Run)"
Region	Certification	Certified units/sales
Canada (Music Canada)	Gold	50,000^{^}
United Kingdom (BPI)	Gold	400,000^{‡}
United States (RIAA)	Gold	1,000,000^{^}
^{^} Shipments figures based on certification alone.^{‡} Sales+streaming figures based on certification alone.

== See also ==
- List of Billboard Hot 100 number-one singles of 1984
- List of number-one dance singles of 1984 (U.S.)
- List of number-one singles of 1984 (Canada)
- List of number-one singles from the 1980s (New Zealand)
- List of number-one R&B singles of 1984 (U.S.)
