= Blanc de Hotot =

Breed of rabbit

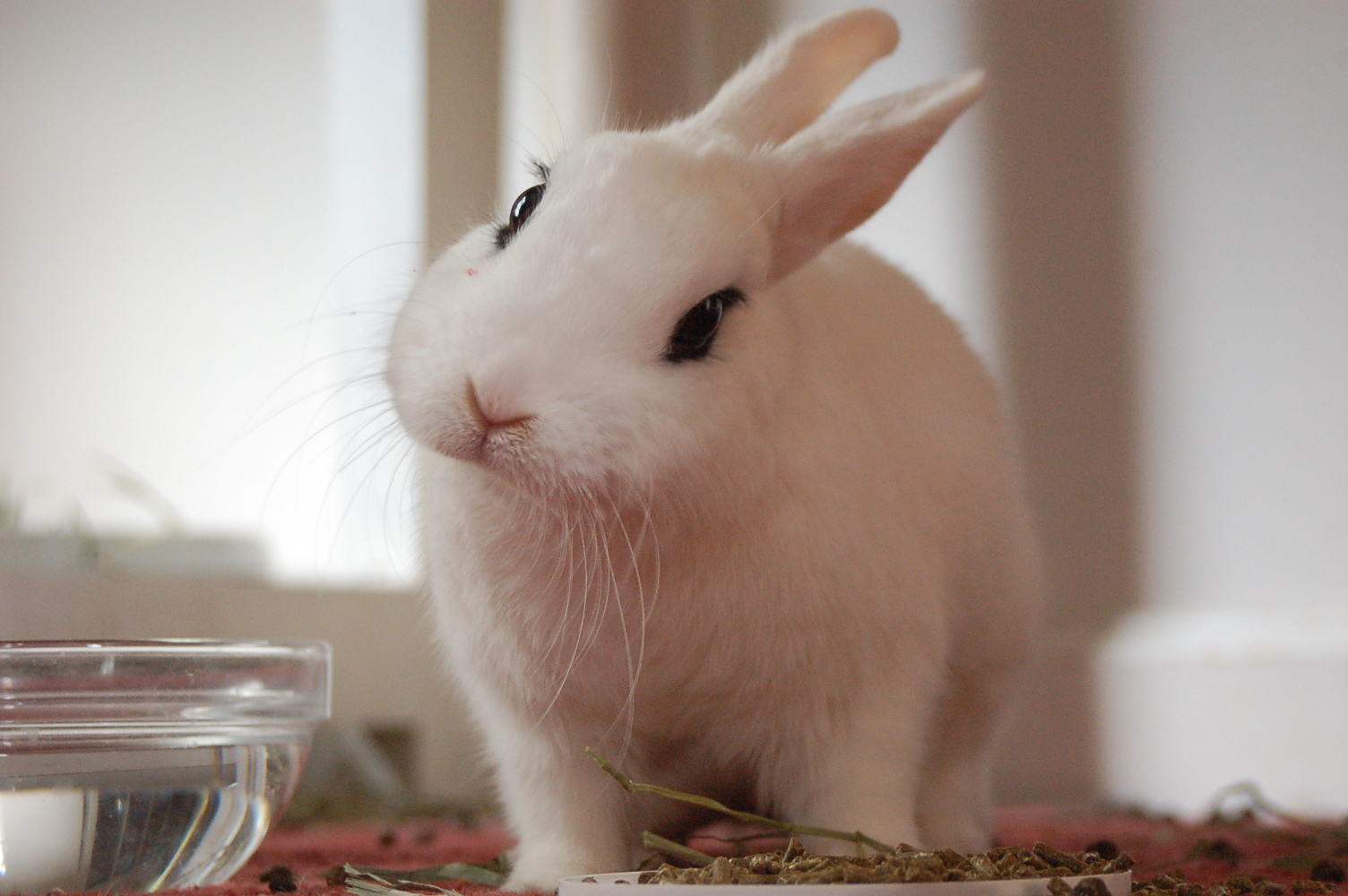
Blanc de Hotot rabbit

The Blanc de Hotot is a medium-sized rabbit breed originally developed in France. It is a compact, thickset white rabbit with spectacle-like black rings around each dark eye. First bred in Hotot-en-Auge, Normandy, France in the early 1900s, the breed spread throughout Europe and into North America by the 1920s. Initially unpopular in the United States, it died out there, and suffered population decline in World War II-era Europe. It began to spread again in the 1960s and 1970s, and was re-imported to the US in 1978. Today it is recognized by the British Rabbit Council and the American Rabbit Breeders Association, but is considered globally endangered, with a listing of "threatened" status by the American Livestock Breeds Conservancy.

== Characteristics ==
The Blanc de Hotot is always white, with black bands around the eyes, which by breed registry standards should not be more than 1/16 to 1/8 inch (0.16 to 0.32 cm) wide. These bands give the breed "the appearance of fine spectacles around the eye". The body type is compact, thickset and somewhat rounded. Dewlaps are sometimes present in does, but are penalized in showing for bucks. The breed has a wide chest, short neck and well muscled fore- and hind-quarters. Originally the black eye bands were not part of the breed standard, which instead described black eyelashes and gray lower eyelids. The fur has a large number of guard hairs, which create a sheen reminiscent of frost. Bucks weigh 8 to 10 pounds (3.6 to 4.5 kg) and does 9 to 11 pounds (4.1 to 5.0 kg). The Blanc de Hotot is an active and hardy breed.

== History ==
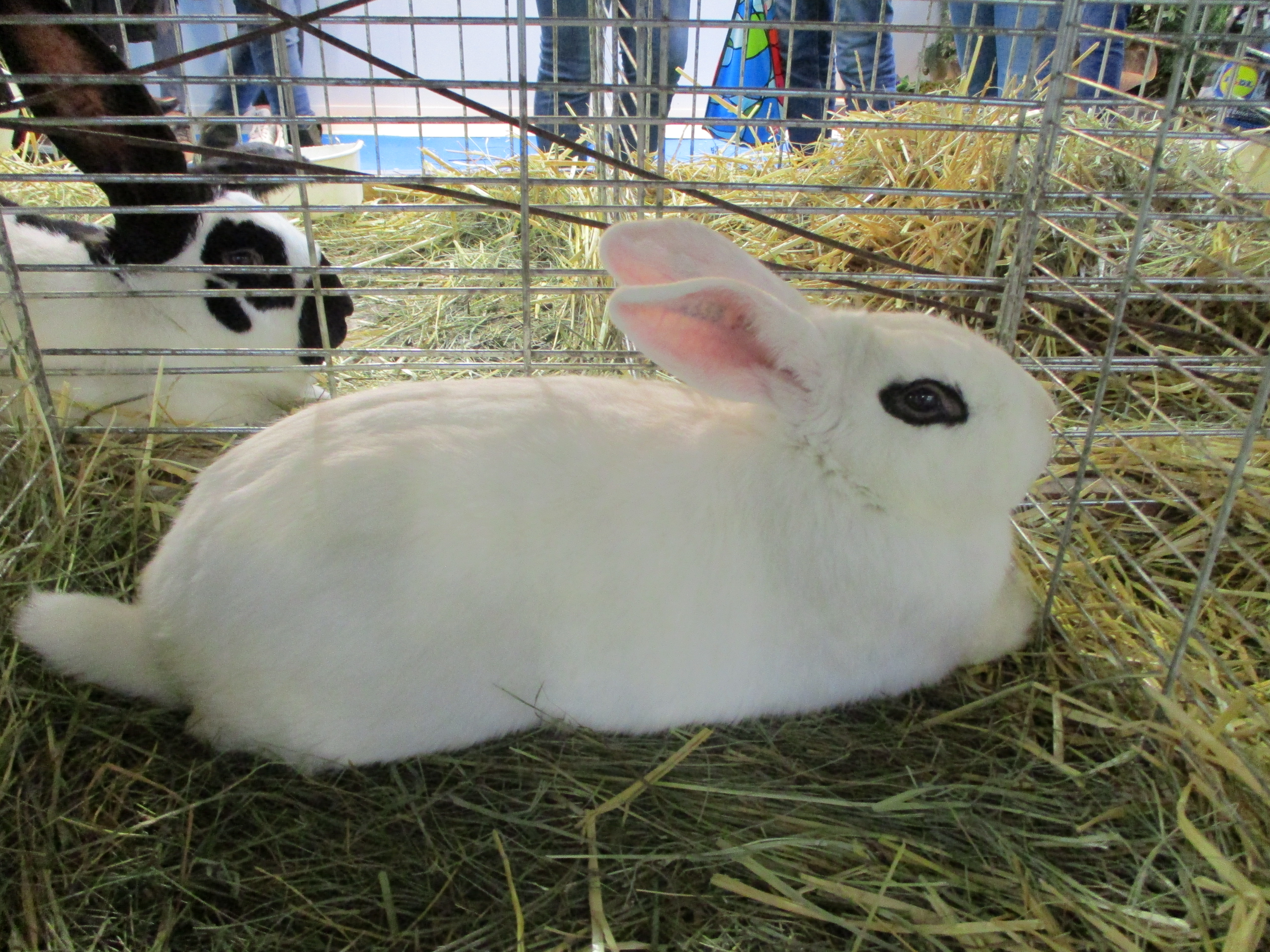
Hotot rabbit.

The Blanc de Hotot was developed in Hotot-en-Auge, Normandy, France by Eugénie Bernhard, a noted rabbit breeder. She bred for the desired white and black coloration on a rabbit suitable for both meat and fur production. Around 1902, Bernhard crossed Vienna White and Checkered Giant rabbits with white Flemish Giants, and by 1912 produced what is recognized as the first Blanc de Hotot rabbit. In 1920, a member of the breed appeared in show for the first time at the Exposition Internationale d'Aviculture in Paris, France, and they were officially recognized as a breed in 1922. In 1921 and 1922, they were first exported to the United States, although the breed was not popular in that country and died out.

In 1927, they began to be exported to Switzerland, where they became very popular. In 1930, the German Frederick Joppich began raising Blanc de Hotots, and would come to be called the "greatest supporter" of the breed. World War II caused major population decreases, almost resulting in extinction for the breed in France, the Netherlands and Germany. Joppich, and many of his rabbits, remained in East Germany when the country was divided following World War II. However, a fellow breeder began to spread the rabbits throughout the Federal Republic of Germany (West Germany) in the 1960s, and by 1970, there were 62 Blanc de Hotots registered in a major show in Stuttgart.

Exports to the United States began again in 1978, and in September of that year, the first Blanc de Hotots to be shown in the US were exhibited at the New Mexico State Fair. In 1979, the Blanc de Hotot was recognized by the American Rabbit Breeders Association. In the US, Blanc de Hotots have been crossed with White Beverens, White New Zealands and White Satins to increase the available gene pool. In 2004, additional imports to the US were made from Germany, the Netherlands and England. The Blanc de Hotot is considered globally endangered, and is listed by the American Livestock Breeds Conservancy at "threatened" status, meaning they have a global population of less than 1,000 and less than 100 registrations in the US each year. The Blanc de Hotot is recognized by the British Rabbit Council and the American Rabbit Breeders Association. In Britain, the Blanc de Hotot is grouped with other rare rabbit breeds in the Rare Varieties Club. In the United States, the breeder association is named the Hotot Rabbit Breeders International.

== See also ==
- List of rabbit breeds
