= Agnes Hotot =

English noblewoman

- Years active: fl. 1395
- Known for: Winning a lance fight

Agnes Hotot (fl. 1395) was an English noblewoman known for besting a man in a lance fight. According to Arthur Collins, writing in 1741, an unspecified monk recorded that Hotot took her father's place in a duel after he fell ill, disguising herself as a man, and only revealed her true identity after knocking her opponent off his horse. When Hotot later married into the Dudley family of Clapton, Northamptonshire (now Clopton), the Dudleys commemorated her exploits with a new crest depicting a woman wearing a war helmet.

More modern accounts of Agnes Hotot's story have altered and combined it with the Clopton ghost story of "Skulking Dudley", painting Agnes as the virtuous daughter of an immoral man from the Dudley family. In this version, Agnes takes her father's place in the duel after he cowardly feigns illness. She ends up marrying her opponent.

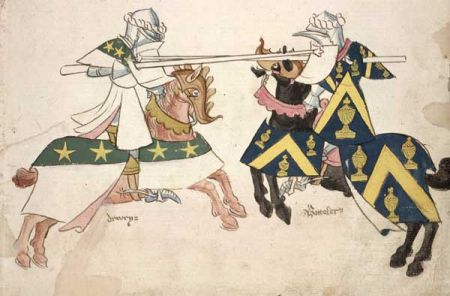
In this medieval illustration of a jousting tournament, two contestants ride towards each other with lances raised.

== Biography ==
Agnes Hotot was a young heiress of the family of Hotot. Her father was Sir John Hotot.

Hotot's father was involved in a dispute with a man named Ringsley, and in order to settle it, they arranged to have a lance fight. Shortly before the duel, however, Hotot's father fell ill with gout, so "rather than he should lose the land, or suffer in his honor", Hotot disguised herself in her father's armour and fought in his place at the tourney. She knocked Ringsley off his horse. As her opponent lay in the dirt, Hotot took off her helmet and let down her hair to reveal her true identity. Some accounts state that she also removed her breastplate to expose herself as a woman.

In 1395, Hotot married into the Northamptonshire Dudleys of Clapton (now Clopton). The Dudley family created a new crest in commemoration of Hotot's lance victory, which included "a woman's bust, her hair disheveled, bosom bare, a helmet on her head, with the stay or throat-latch down", and the Dudley family displayed this crest for many years afterwards. Hotot's story was recorded by a monk in the village of Clapton.

More modern accounts of Hotot have combined her story with the legend of "Skulking Dudley": a man from the Dudley family who, after supposedly committing murder in the 1300s, returned to haunt Clopton villagers in the early 20th century. In this modern version, Agnes is the daughter of Skulking Dudley; her father offends a nearby landowner, then cowardly feigns illness to escape the duel, and Agnes takes his place to save the family honour. Although she loses the fight, her opponent discovers her identity, spares her life, and marries her.
