= Lourett Russell Grant =

American singer and dancer

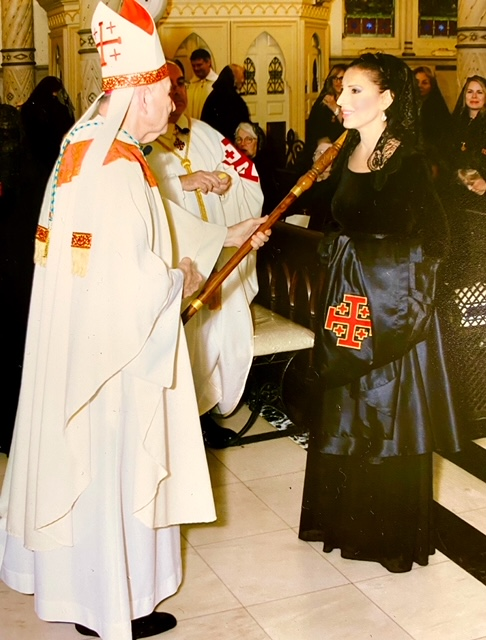
- Grant being made a Dame of the Order of the Holy Sepulchre in 2022.

Background information
- Genres: Disco; dance music; rock; pop
- Occupations: singer; songwriter; record producer; model; dancer
- Labels: Alverez Records; WEA International; Quality Records
- Website: lourettrussellgrant.com

Lourett Russell Grant DHS (/ˈlɔːrɛt/) is an American singer, model, and dancer. She co-wrote and performed the disco hit "Hot to Trot" and was a fixture in the dance music scene throughout the 1980s.

== Career ==
Grant's career as a singer solidified once she met Silvio Tancredi in New York City in 1978. The son of the consular agent at the Italian consulate in New York City, Tancredi was a musician-turned-record producer who had been contracted to Atlantic Records by Ahmet Ertegun, the company's co-founder. Tancredi had produced Yellow Fever by Herbie Mann and Stairway to Love by the disco group Wonder Band.

Tancredi championed Grant's music career, wanting to make her the "Dance Music Star for the 80s." Together, they wrote and produced Grant's hit electro-rock-disco twelve-inch single, "Hot to Trot", co-written by Jeffrey (Jeff) Schoen. Grant resided for several years at the exclusive, all female Barbizon Hotel in New York while Tancredi judiciously advanced her stardom. Grant and Tancredi co-founded Northcott Productions Ltd. and the custom record label Alverez Records Ltd. to produce, manufacture, and distribute the recording. Later, the recording would be picked up by WEA International and Quality Records for international distribution.

Grant's vocal performance was described as "impassioned," "hot," and "emotionally plaintive." The vocals were accompanied by "Italo bleeps and spare rhodes chords," driven by a digital Synclavier rhythm along with a pulsating bass guitar riff and an overlay of hard-hitting percussion that builds into a powerful crescendo. The mix on the A-side enhanced the dance club experience, featuring the sound of gallops that panned across the dance floor. The mix on the B-side was distinctly different; it omitted the gallops and was intensified on the high and low ends to make for more memorable radio play. To underscore the image, Grant dressed in black leather jeans, a cowboy hat, and gun holsters when she performed to promote the recording.

The recording was played in heavy rotation on the radio and in diverse dance clubs throughout the United States; John "Jellybean" Benitez, disc jockey at Xenon and other New York City clubs (and remixer of artists like Madonna), was an early supporter. The record debuted at number 70 on Billboard's Top 100 Disco chart, placing higher than "On the Radio" by Donna Summer and "Rock with You / Don't Stop Til You Get Enough" by Michael Jackson. The record remained on the chart for fifteen weeks. Major labels Quality Records and WEA International capitalized on the recording's domestic success by picking up the recording for distribution in the Canadian and European markets, respectively. In 2010, the recording was released on the second album of Horse Meat Disco, a London collective of four disc jockeys who curate disco compilations to continue to bring the genre to public attention. The recording is a collector's item.

After the success of her recording, Grant gained access to elite Italian social circles, aided by Tancredi's social connections; she was photographed by Vogue photographer Marco Glaviano. Grant also modeled for photographer Michael Keller and modeled in rock videos such as Rick Derringer's Shake Me, which was produced by Jake Hooker (who was married to Lorna Luft at the time).

Grant remained a fixture in the dance club scene. Grant and Tancredi's Northcott company ran a handful of dance labels, managing its own publishing, production, manufacturing, and distribution. Club disc jockey Tommy Musto joined as head of production and A&R–"Artists and Repertoire," responsible for talent scouting and artist development–and ushered the company into becoming an essential outlet for New York City garage house dance music.

After her time with Tancredi, Grant continued working in the music business. She sang with the Long Island-based rock band Loose Endz, which also featured a female bass player and a female drummer; the group performed at such venues as The Limelight in New York City. In 1990, Grant was signed by Warren Schatz, former senior executive with RCA and BMG's Ariola America. While signed with Schatz's Perfect Sound Studios, Inc., Grant wrote I Know (What You Need).

As tastes in New York City's music scene drifted towards the rap and hip-hop genres, Grant shifted her focus. She earned a scholarship from the Goethe Institute in New York to study German in Germany in exchange for developing a promotional song for the institute. Grant later recorded the classic Ich bin von Kopf bis fuss and wrote and recorded an original German pop song, "Lass mich oder lieb mich baby". Later, she followed through on early training in dance and became a professional dancer.

== Personal life ==
Grant is a member of the Guild of One-Name Studies, a registered charity in the United Kingdom. Grant researches and disseminates information about her family's surname Philippides' ancestral connections to the ancient statesman Philippides of Paiania. She is also an academic historical writer whose articles have been published.

On June 4, 2022 Grant, a devout Catholic, was appointed as a Dame of the Order of the Holy Sepulchre by Archbishop Gregory Michael Aymond at the Immaculate Conception Church in New Orleans.
