= List of feminist anthems =

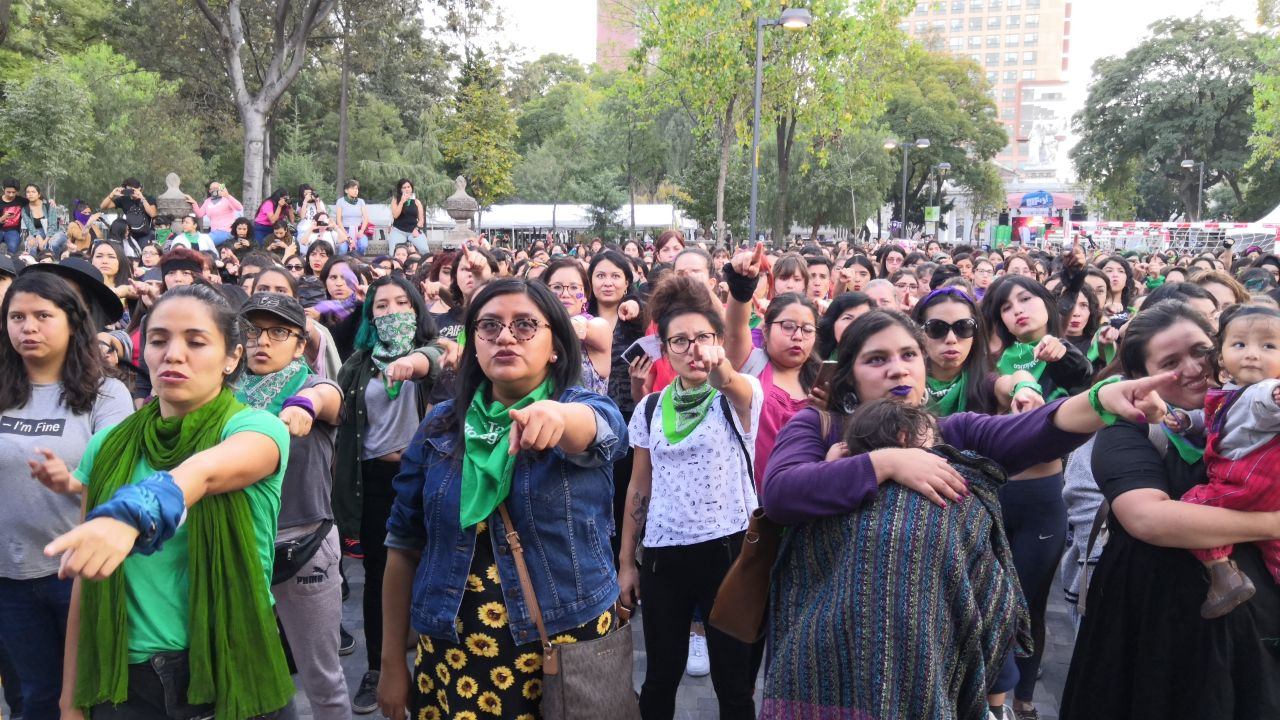
Mexican women performing the protest song "Un violador en tu camino" (A Rapist in Your Path)

This is a list of songs described as feminist anthems celebrating women's empowerment, or used as protest songs against gender inequality. These songs range from airy pop affirmations such as "Girls Just Want to Have Fun" by Cyndi Lauper, to solemn calls to action such as "We Shall Go Forth" by Margie Adam.

Songs have been used for many years to bring people together to work for women's rights. In the United States, the 1884 song "The Equal-Rights Banner" was sung to the tune of the US national anthem by American activists for women's voting rights. "The March of the Women" and "The Women's Marseillaise" were sung by British suffragettes as anthems of the women's suffrage movement in the 1900s–1910s.

The most prominent anthem of second-wave feminism is Helen Reddy's "I Am Woman", a pop song which appeared as an album track in 1971 without making a splash. It was released a second time in May 1972 after being altered and re-recorded. This improved version of the song slowly climbed the United States single charts, its airplay resisted by male deejays at radio stations, but urged forward by the demand of female listeners. The song finally hit number 1 in December 1972. "I Am Woman", with its uplifting message of female strength, was played and sung many times by women promoting the cause of feminism. In 2020, a documentary about the making of the song was released: I Am Woman, starring Tilda Cobham-Hervey as Reddy.

During the 1970s, earlier songs such as Aretha Franklin's "Respect" (1967) were brought forward as feminist anthems. Franklin's song, originally written by Otis Redding but significantly reworked by Franklin, serves multiple purposes including standing firm in personal relationships, advocating women's rights, and asserting racial equality for African Americans.

Before the women's liberation movement, popular songs sung by women often expressed subservience to men. Songs about independence from men were rare; many of these are now considered steps toward feminism. Examples include Sophie Tucker's self-explanatory "I Ain't Taking Orders From No One" (1920s), "No More" recorded in 1944 by Billie Holiday, and 1965's "Ain't No Use" by Nina Simone—the latter two about a woman leaving her man after suffering too many abuses. Shocking in its day, the 1963 song "You Don't Own Me" sung by Lesley Gore describes the singer standing up to her controlling boyfriend. In 2015, singer Saygrace took Gore's song to No. 1 in Australia with a version featuring rapper G-Eazy.

Women around the world have used songs to unite in feminism and to organize for women's rights. Mexican singer Vivir Quintana is known for her song "Canción sin miedo" (Song Without Fear) which in 2020 became an anthem to fight violence against women. In the Philippines, the 1981 song "Babae Ka" (You Are Woman) was covered by activist Susan Fernandez and also by the duo Inang Laya in the early 1980s as a protest against the reactionary patriarchal policies of dictator Ferdinand Marcos. In Chile starting in 2019, the song "Un violador en tu camino" (A Rapist in Your Path) by the collective Las Tesis has been performed by masses of women who sing and dance to protest police violence. This form of protest has spread to other countries.

== Songs ==
| Year | Artist | Song | Album | Notes |
|---|---|---|---|---|
| 1884 | C. C. Harrah | "The Equal-Rights Banner" | | An American anthem for women's voting rights, the lyrics were written by Reverend C. C. Harrah, sung to the tune of "The Star-Spangled Banner". The second verse mentions the evil of "License", referring to alcohol abuse by men, a central issue for women in the Temperance movement. |
| 1891 (text) c.1890s (music) | Lyricist: David Edelstadt Music: Traditional | "Arbeter Froyen" | | A Yiddish-language poem that was adopted as a song by striking workers in the Russian Empire. The song extols working-class women to stand up together in the fight for liberation as both a sex and as class. |
| 1908 | Florence MacAulay | "The Women's Marseillaise" | | The lyrics were written by Florence MacAulay to the tune of the French anthem "La Marseillaise". It was one of the anthems of the British Women's Social and Political Union, and it was also sung in other countries. |
| 1910 | Cicely Hamilton | "The March of the Women" | | With words by Cicely Hamilton and music by Ethel Smyth, the song was the official anthem of British women fighting for voting rights, and was also sung worldwide. |
| 1963 | Lesley Gore | "You Don't Own Me" | Lesley Gore Sings of Mixed-Up Hearts | |
| 1967 | Aretha Franklin | "Respect" | I Never Loved a Man the Way I Love You | Written by Otis Redding and released by him in 1965, the song was changed by Franklin to suit a woman's viewpoint. |
| 1971 | Helen Reddy | "I Am Woman" | I Don't Know How to Love Him | The song was not a chart hit until it was remade in 1972 and released as a single. The hit version was included in the album I Am Woman released later that year. |
| 1972 | Yoko Ono | "Sisters, O Sisters" | Some Time in New York City | Accompanied by her husband John Lennon and the band Elephant's Memory, Ono encourages women to join and make the world a better place. |
| 1977 | Margie Adam | "We Shall Go Forth" | Margie Adam | Adam sang the song at the 1977 National Women's Conference in Houston, and it became a feminist as well as a gay anthem promoting LGBT rights in the United States. |
| 1978 | Gloria Gaynor | "I Will Survive" | Love Tracks | |
| 1978 | Chaka Khan | "I'm Every Woman" | Chaka | |
| 1979 | Peggy Seeger | "Reclaim the Night" | Different Therefore Equal | Folk singer Peggy Seeger denounces the patriarchal system which enables men to rape women and children. The song was sung by feminists in the 1983 documentary about Greenham Common Women's Peace Camp, and it has been sung at various protest marches including the 2017 Women's March. |
| 1979 | Sister Sledge | "We Are Family" | We Are Family | |
| 1980 | Dolly Parton | "9 to 5" | 9 to 5 and Odd Jobs | Created for the playful-but-anti-patriarchal comedy film 9 to 5, the song was picked up as an anthem for women working in the office. |
| 1980s | Naomi Littlebear Morena | "You Can't Kill the Spirit" | | Sung by thousands at the Greenham Common Women's Peace Camp in the 1980s. |
| 1981 | Sister Sledge | "All American Girls" | All American Girls | |
| 1982 | Grace Jones | "Nipple to the Bottle" | Living My Life | |
| 1983 | Cyndi Lauper | "Girls Just Want to Have Fun" | She's So Unusual | Described as a feminist anthem for its perky assertion of feminine solidarity. |
| 1983 | Donna Summer | "She Works Hard for the Money" | She Works Hard for the Money | |
| 1985 | Eurythmics | "Sisters Are Doin' It for Themselves" | Be Yourself Tonight | Featuring Aretha Franklin, the song also appearing on her album Who's Zoomin' Who?. |
| 1989 | Queen Latifah | "Ladies First" | All Hail the Queen | Featuring Monie Love. |
| 1989 | Tears for Fears | "Woman in Chains" | The Seeds of Love | Featuring Oleta Adams. |
| 1992 | Mary Chapin Carpenter | "He Thinks He'll Keep Her" | Come On Come On | A country music song in which an unappreciated wife leaves her husband of 15 years to join the workforce. |
| 1993 | Bikini Kill | "Rebel Girl" | Yeah Yeah Yeah Yeah | Produced by Joan Jett who also plays guitar, the song celebrates the sisterhood of punk. It is a leading example of the 1990s riot grrrl feminist movement. |
| 1993 | Queen Latifah | "U.N.I.T.Y." | Black Reign | A hip hop song that confronts violence against women, it provided Queen Latifah with her biggest chart hit and a Grammy Award. |
| 1995 | No Doubt | "Just a Girl" | Tragic Kingdom | No Doubt's frontwoman Gwen Stefani rails against the assumption that women are submissive to men. |
| 1998 | Rachael Sage | "Sistersong" | Smashing the Serene | Sage wrote "Sistersong" as a tribute to women's independence, honoring Ani DiFranco who established her own record label. In 2018, Sage reworked the song and released it in acoustic form as "Sistersong 2018" for the #MeToo movement, with proceeds benefiting Girls, Inc. |
| 1999 | Le Tigre | "Hot Topic" | Le Tigre | Riot grrrl band Le Tigre honors feminist heroes such as Yoko Ono, Joan Jett, Nina Simone and Aretha Franklin. |
| 2001 | Paulina Rubio | "Yo No Soy Esa Mujer" | Paulina | "Yo No Soy Esa Mujer" (I Am Not That Woman) shows the singer telling her man that she will not be subservient. |
| 2003 | Christina Aguilera | "Can't Hold Us Down" | Stripped | Featuring Lil' Kim. |
| 2005 | Robyn | "Handle Me" | Robyn | |
| 2007 | Annie Lennox | "Sing" | Songs of Mass Destruction | "Sing" is a charity single that features 19 other women singing, including Madonna, Faith Hill, k. d. lang, Dido and more. Proceeds benefited Treatment Action Campaign. |
| 2008 | Beyoncé | "Single Ladies (Put a Ring on It)" | I Am... Sasha Fierce | "Single Ladies" brings women together to celebrate independence. |
| 2011 | Beyoncé | "Run the World (Girls)" | 4 | "Run the World (Girls)" encourages female empowerment. |
| 2012 | Marina Diamandis | "Sex Yeah" | Electra Heart | A track about societal gender roles assigned at birth, described as a "feminist statement". |
| 2012 | M.I.A. | "Bad Girls" | Matangi | |
| 2013 | Lily Allen | "Hard out Here" | Sheezus | "Hard out Here" received critical acclaim upon release. Rolling Stone praised the song calling it a "feminist anthem through and through", and noted the subjects which Allen tackles including "tired gender roles and expectations to double standards regarding sex and appearance for men and women". |
| 2015 | Marina Diamandis | "Can't Pin Me Down" | Froot | “Can’t Pin Me Down” provides a candid and direct callout of misconceptions surrounding feminism and the actions of women. |
| 2015 | Downtown Boys | "Monstro" | Full Communism | Downtown Boys are a "sax punk" band from Rhode Island, with several women members. Spin magazine described the band's lead single "Monstro" as a "thrashing feminist anthem". |
| 2015 | Speedy Ortiz | "Raising the Skate" | Foil Deer | Described by Flavorwire as a feminist anthem, the singer faces her male opposition to "prove 'em wrong". |
| 2016 | Anna Wise | "BitchSlut" | | "BitchSlut" is about double standards, and was described by HuffPost as a "gratifying rundown of slut-shaming and sexist culture". |
| 2017 | Milck | "Quiet" | | The song "Quiet" was performed by Milck and 26 singers for the 2017 Women's March. Uploaded videos went viral. |
| 2017 | Zolita | "Fight Like a Girl" | Sappho | i-D magazine wrote that the contemporary R&B song "Fight Like a Girl" is "a bewitching feminist power anthem championing equal rights and diversity." |
| 2017 | Rachel Platten | "Broken Glass" | Waves | Idolator wrote that the song is "an uplifting feminist anthem". |
| 2017 | Mona Haydar | "Hijabi (Wrap My Hijab)" | | "Hijabi" was a viral video in 2017, Haydar's first international hit song. Billboard magazine named it one of the “Top 25 Feminist Anthems." |
| 2018 | Kesha | "Woman" | Rainbow | The funk/pop song "Woman" emphatically asserts the singer's self-sufficiency and independence. Parade listed it as one of Kesha's "empowering feminist anthems". |
| 2018 | Christina Aguilera | "Fall in Line" | Liberation | Featuring Demi Lovato. |
| 2018 | Ariana Grande | "God Is a Woman" | Sweetener | This anthemic fusion of hip hop and pop ends with a gospel-inflected swell. The song's video shows the singer embracing her feminine power, rejecting the insults of small-minded men, and allowing her womanly divinity to shine out. |
| 2018 | Little Mix featuring Nicki Minaj | "Woman Like Me" | LM5 | Jess Glynne and Ed Sheeran wrote the song for Glynne, but they offered it to Little Mix instead. Nicki Minaj raps on the third verse. MTV said the "girl power" song challenges the stereotype of submissive women. |
| 2018 | Lynzy Lab | "A Scary Time" | | Hollywood Reporter classified this viral video as a feminist anthem, the singer protesting against comments made by Donald Trump related to the media attention surrounding Brett Kavanaugh's alleged sexual attack of Christine Blasey Ford. |
| 2018 | BoA | "Woman" | Woman | The Korean language song "Woman" was described by Rolling Stone India as a K-pop feminist anthem promoting women's self-sufficiency and diversity. |
| 2018 | Meg Mac | "Give Me My Name Back" | Hope | Australian singer-songwriter Meg Mac broadens the scope of this anthem to include women's rights, the rights of indigenous Australians, civil rights for the LGBT community, and reparations for those who suffered Catholic Church sexual abuse as children. |
| 2018 | Little Mix | "Joan of Arc" | LM5 | Idolator wrote that this upbeat dance number was a "fiercely feminist anthem". |
| 2018 | Sara Bareilles | "Armor" | Amidst the Chaos | Bareilles wrote and released "Armor" as part of the #MeToo movement. |
| 2019 | CLC | "NO" | "No.1" | The theme of the song is that people shouldn’t try to impose their beauty expectations on women. The opening lines are about how frivolous beauty related gifts are and they emphasise that women are much more than their beauty. “Red Lip, NO / Earrings, NO / High heels, NO / Handbag, NO” |
| 2019 | Avril Lavigne | "Dumb Blonde" | Head Above Water | Featuring Nicki Minaj. |
| 2019 | Tamara Todevska | "Proud" | | Todevska performed the song at the Eurovision Song Contest 2019, representing North Macedonia. The song celebrates womanhood and feminism, but is also intended for any downtrodden person striving for equality. |
| 2019 | Miley Cyrus | "Mother's Daughter" | She Is Coming | On October 22, 2020, the Constitutional Tribunal of Poland ruled that an abortion in cases of "disability or incurable illness" of fetus is unconstitutional (in practice, the provision that was ruled unconstitutional represented the majority of more than 90% abortions legally done in Poland each year). Due to this, "Mother's Daughter" went viral in Poland, becoming one of the most listened to songs at the time. Thousands of women took the streets to demand decriminalization of abortion with phrases inspired by the verses of the song such as "Don't mess with my freedom" written on posters. The phenomenon had several pictures circulating the internet, as well as videos of the protesters singing the song, and was also shared and endorsed by Cyrus on her social media. |
| 2019 | Las Tesis | "A Rapist in Your Path" | | Chilean protest song and performance piece to protest police violence against women. |
| 2019 | MAMAMOO | "HIP" | Reality in Black | The girls send flying gender roles in society, more precisely in jobs. |
| 2020 | Vivir Quintana | "Canción sin miedo" | | Commissioned by Chilean singer Mon Laferte to perform at a women's equality festival in Mexico City, Quintana's recording of the song "Canción sin miedo" (Song Without Fear) went viral on WhatsApp prior to the festival. |
| 2020 | Ava Max | "Kings & Queens" | Heaven & Hell | Max sings to the power of women, requiring equality with men. |
| 2020 | Refund Sisters | "Don't Touch Me" | | Supergroup singing about consent to touch somebody's body, here women's ones. |
| 2020 | Marina Diamandis | "Man's World" | Ancient Dreams in a Modern Land | With the lyrics about the womanhood treatment in history, Marina assembled an all-star team of female collaborators to create song and video after learning that women account for only two percent of producers and three percent of engineers involved in popular music. As explained by Marina herself, "The original idea for the song was to write a snapshot of how women and LGBTQ+ individuals have been subjugated and discriminated against throughout history going back to the Salem witch trials, where any person who was deemed abnormal or slightly alternative was singled out." |
| 2021 | Loud Women | "Reclaim These Streets" | | A charity single written by Cassie Fox with additional lyrics performed by Brix Smith, featuring 60 British women singing, including Siobhan Fahey, Debbie Googe, Charley Stone, Debbie Smith, Laura Kidd and many more. Loud Women, a non-profit organization, released the song as part of protests against the death of Sarah Everard. |
| 2021 | Samanta Tīna | "The Moon Is Rising" | | Tīna performed the song for the Eurovision Song Contest 2021, representing Latvia. The song describes women taking control of their lives. |
| 2021 | Yola | "Stand for Myself" | Stand for Myself | Consequence called the song "a Black feminist anthem". |
| 2021 | Emmy Meli | "I Am Woman" | | Filled with self-affirmations, the song went viral on TikTok in October 2021, inspiring many more cover versions. |
| 2021 | Christina Aguilera | "Pa Mis Muchachas" | Aguilera | Aguilera joins American Becky G and Argentines Nicki Nicole and Nathy Peluso to perform the song "Pa Mis Muchachas" (For My Girls) which has been called a "decadent, grrl-power–filled showcase" and "a modern-day girl-power anthem that honors the Latinas that came before us". |
| 2022 | St. Vincent | "The Melting of the Sun" | Daddy's Home | Rolling Stone wrote that in "The Melting of the Sun" Anne Clark muses on women who have been crushed or otherwise mistreated by the entertainment industry, as she explains it is "a love letter to strong, brilliant female artists." |
| 2022 | Florence and the Machine | "King" | Dance Fever | Grazia magazine wrote that "King" is 2022's feminist anthem. The singer reflects on the contradictions of womanhood. |
| 2022 | Mehdi Yarrahi | "Soroode Zan" ("Woman's Anthem") | | Iranian lyricist and poet Mona Borzouei wrote the words to "Woman's Anthem", sung by Mehdi Yarrahi who wrote the music as a response to the death of Mahsa Amini. Borzouei was arrested by Iranian authorities for advocating women's rights, as part of the Mahsa Amini protests in September 2022. The song repeats the protest slogan "Woman, Life, Freedom" in the Iranian language. |
| 2023 | Vesna | "My Sister's Crown" | | This song, described by BBC News and The Times as a feminist anthem, represented the Czech Republic in the Eurovision Song Contest 2023. |
| 2023 | Demi Lovato | "Swine" | | Lovato wrote and released "Swine" in response to the one-year anniversary of the Supreme Court's decision to overturn Roe v. Wade in 2022. Billboard describes "Swine" as a "long lost nu-metal anthem" in which Lovato "rage[s] against the system that aims to strip women of their bodily autonomy." |
| 2023 | Paris Paloma | "Labour" | | "Labour" has been described as an "anthem for female rage" that addresses issues of gender inequality within societal structures. Snippets from the song went viral on TikTok receiving over 1 million streams on Spotify within 24 hours of release, and 1 million views on YouTube. After the single's release, it started a viral trend in which women posted TikTok videos with the song where they described their own personal experiences with sexism |
| 2023 | Hwasa | "I Love My Body" | | Ode to self-love, and more particularly the love of one's body as a woman. |
| 2024 | Jennie | "Mantra" | Ruby | A girl-power song encouraging self-empowerment, the lyrics underscore the theme of women standing for each other. |
| 2026 | Paris Paloma | "Good Girl" | | "[A] rejection of the idea that a woman’s body exists for consumption or ornamentation, insisting instead on bodily autonomy and self-definition." |
| 2026 | Olivia Rodrigo | "Serena Joy" | | |

== See also ==
- Girl power
- Women's music
