= Lost Domain (album) =

Studio album by Tim Wheeler
- Released: 7 November 2014
- Length: 49:15
- Label: Sony RED
- Producers: Tim Wheeler, Claudius Mittendorfer

Tim Wheeler chronology
This Is Christmas (2011)	Lost Domain (2014)

Lost Domain is the debut studio album by Irish musician Tim Wheeler, following his collaboration album with Emmy the Great, This Is Christmas (2011). Lost Domain was released on 7 November 2014 through Sony RED.

== Background and recording ==
As a member of Ash, frontman Tim Wheeler released several top ten-charting albums, including the number ones 1977 (1996) and Free All Angels (2001). In 2008, Tim Wheeler's father George Wheeler started suffering from Alzheimer's disease. After two years, he was admitted to a dementia ward; Tim Wheeler would spend the next six months travelling across the Atlantic Ocean to visit his father. In January 2011, George Wheeler died because of the disease. Upon returning to his home in New York City, Tim Wheeler attempted to focus his efforts on Ash. He found himself reminiscing on the time he spent visiting his father. As a way to cope with the death, Wheeler began writing songs about the situation. He would subsequently compose soundtracks for television and films, such as for Spike Island (2012) and Fleming: The Man Who Would Be Bond. He was contemplating Ash's next album; alongside this, he realised he had some experimental ideas that he wanted to work on and expand into a solo album.

Wheeler initially had difficulty structuring the songs, as this was something he previously had assistance on with his bandmates bassist Mark Hamilton and drummer Rick McMurrary. Wheeler came across Mat Whitecross, who was working on the film Ashes, which dealt with the disease. Whiteacross asked Wheeler if he would contribute music to the movie. Over a period of time, Wheeler wrote several tracks with Emmy the Great, culminating in their joint effort, This Is Christmas (2011). Shortly after this, Ash played a show in November 2011 with the Divine Comedy; the father of the latter's frontman was also suffering from Alzheimer's. Wheeler subsequently began working with the charity Alzheimer's Society. Wheeler recorded a solo album at a studio in New York City that Ash used; Claudius Mittendorfer and Wheeler produced the proceedings.

== Composition and lyrics ==
Musically, the sound of Lost Domain has been described as orchestral; it is a concept album that details George Wheeler's death as a result of Alzheimer's. AllMusic reviewer James Christopher Monger said the album's themes unfold "more or less happens in real time", such as the diagnosis of the disease, experiencing the illness that followed and the eventual death. musicOMH contributor John Murphy said the album can be broken into three sections, namely the "initial shock of the diagnosis, which leads into hospital visits and death, and eventually the final coming to terms with mortality and a focus on celebrating the departed person’s life". Monger said that Tim Wheeler provided "(in great detail) arresting images of hospital visits, pain management, heartfelt family discussions, and various other (seemingly) mundane components of end-stage care". Detailing the album's sound, The Irish Times writer Lauren Murphy said listeners "expecting histrionic guitars on the Ash frontman's solo debut might be surprised to learn that this is a sumptuous, largely orchestral affair".

The album opens with "Snow in Nara", a guitar-centered instrumental track. Wheeler said having this type of song as the first track was a "nicely cinematic, gentle, and melancholic" way to start the concept. He explained that Nara was a city in Japan, which he would like to visit. "End of an Era" deals with change, specifically, a break-up that Wheeler was experiencing around the time his father was entering the hospital. "Do You Ever Think of Me?" has an orchestral backing that echoes the work of Elbow. It is another break-up track that dated from five-to-six years ago. "Hospital" is a piano ballad that compiles several events, including his father and his friends going into hospital. Wheeler explained that he saw his loved ones suffering and wished that he could take their place instead. "Medicine", with its experimental electronic backing, is a 10-minute long song that Wheeler unintentionally wrote from his father's perspective.

During one occasion in the dementia ward, Wheeler saw a piano and proceeded to play it with his father, coming up with a piece of music that he considered to border on ambient. He recorded it and included it on "Medicine". He went home and started playing a chord progression repeatedly, coming up with lyrics via stream-of-consciousness. He revisited it a year later, continuing adding parts to it until it clocked in at 17 minutes in length, which was later edited down to 10 minutes. "First Sign of Spring" was the first song written for the album, and is about dealing with grief. "Vigil" details George Wheeler's last moments as he lays in a hospital bed accompanied by his family. The jazz-indebted instrumental "Vapour", which is in the style of the Divine Comedy, is in 5/4 time. It came about from seeing jazz musicians after bumping into a former school friend while in New York City who was a "total jazz fiend". With the piano ballad "Hold", Wheeler said that after his father's death he kept his feelings inside and felt like a ghost. "Lost Domain" is a Eurodance and synthpop song with chorus sections that recalled the work of Coldplay. Wheeler saw "Lost Domain" as about moving on, which he felt more open to after listening to "Valerie" (1982) by Steve Winwood. The album's closing track, "Monsoon", discusses grief affecting one's ability to be intimate with another person. As he opened the album gently, Wheeler wanted it to end in a similar manner.

== Release ==
On 1 September 2014, Lost Domain was announced for release in two months' time; alongside this, the album's track listing was posted online and "First Sign of Spring" was made available for streaming. The music video for "Vigil" premiered through Gigwise's website on 28 October 2014. Lost Domain was originally scheduled for release on 3 November 2004. After made available for streaming via Drowned in Sound's website on 4 November 2014, it was released on 7 November 2014 for Republic of Ireland and three days later for everywhere else through Sony RED. Ten-percent of the album's sales through PledgeMusic were donated to Alzheimer's Society. Wheeler embarked on a short four-date tour of the UK to promote it. "Vigil" was released as a single on 10 November 2014.

== Reception ==
Professional ratings
Aggregate scores
Source	Rating
AnyDecentMusic?	6.4/10
Metacritic	79/100
Review scores
Source	Rating
AllMusic	4/5 stars
Belfast Telegraph	4/5 stars
Classic Rock	4/5 stars
Evening Standard	3/5 stars
Gigslutz	4/5 stars
The Irish Times	4/5 stars
MusicOMH	4/5 stars
NME	3.5/5 stars
State	1/5 stars

Lost Domain was met with generally favourable reviews from music critics. At Metacritic, which assigns a normalized rating out of 100 to reviews from mainstream publications, the album received an average score of 79, based on seven reviews. AnyDecentMusic? gave it a score of 6.4, based on eight reviews.

Irish Independent writer John Meagher considered it "up there with [Wheeler's] best work he’s yet done", mentioning that there was a "considerable pain and sadness in his well-chosen lyrics, but there’s so much that celebrates life". Monger wrote that the album was "as heavy as it is melodious"; he said that it was a "tiring listen, but it can also be a cathartic one," going on to praise the "adherence to pop craftsmanship and a willingness to see the whole thing through". Gigslutz's James Van Praag shared a similar sentiment, stating that it was "not a difficult listen" for him, adding that the "lyrical content would not work nor be as poignant without the impressively varied and technically proficient music that surrounds it". Lauren Murphy said Wheeler tackles the album's concept in a "remarkably candid manner that is refreshing, moving and even uplifting in places". Evening Standard writer Andre Paine thought it was "lyrically anguished and sometimes experimental".

Classic Rock writer Ian Fortnam said Wheeler made an album "so personal, so effecting [...] that its soul-rending lyrical subject matter is only rendered endurable by the sheer beauty of its masterly musical realisation". Michael Conaghan of Belfast Telegraph felt that Wheeler had "stretched the musical palette to become a genuine multi-instrumentalist". NME journalist Mark Beaumont wrote that Wheeler "constructs pop heartbreakers... capped with his trademark chest-burster choruses. It can be a harrowing listen, but Wheeler sugars the anguish with slabs of OMD synthpop on the title track and 10-minute centrepiece 'Medicine'." John Murphy said there was a "stronger feeling of catharsis and healing evident on Wheeler's record", and warned listeners that it was "probably not one to listen to if you're feeling in a mentally frail state". James Glynn of State called the album "frankly awful" and found it "simply impossible not to question its content which veers from the melodramatic to the downright cheesy".

Irish Independent ranked the album at number nine on their list of the year's best releases from Irish musicians. Lauren Murphy would later include it on a 2022 list of overlooked releases by Irish musicians for The Times. It was nominated for the 2015 Northern Ireland Music Prize, ultimately losing to Before We Forgot How to Dream (2015) by Soak.

== Track listing ==
1. "Snow in Nara" – 3:10
2. "End of an Era" – 4:30
3. "Do You Ever Think of Me?" – 4:02
4. "Hospital" – 5:12
5. "Medicine" – 10:16
6. "Vigil" – 5:22
7. "First Sign of Spring" – 3:03
8. "Vapour" – 2:43
9. "Hold" – 2:21
10. "Lost Domain" – 4:10
11. "Monsoon" – 4:26
