= Malojian =

Irish singer-songwriter

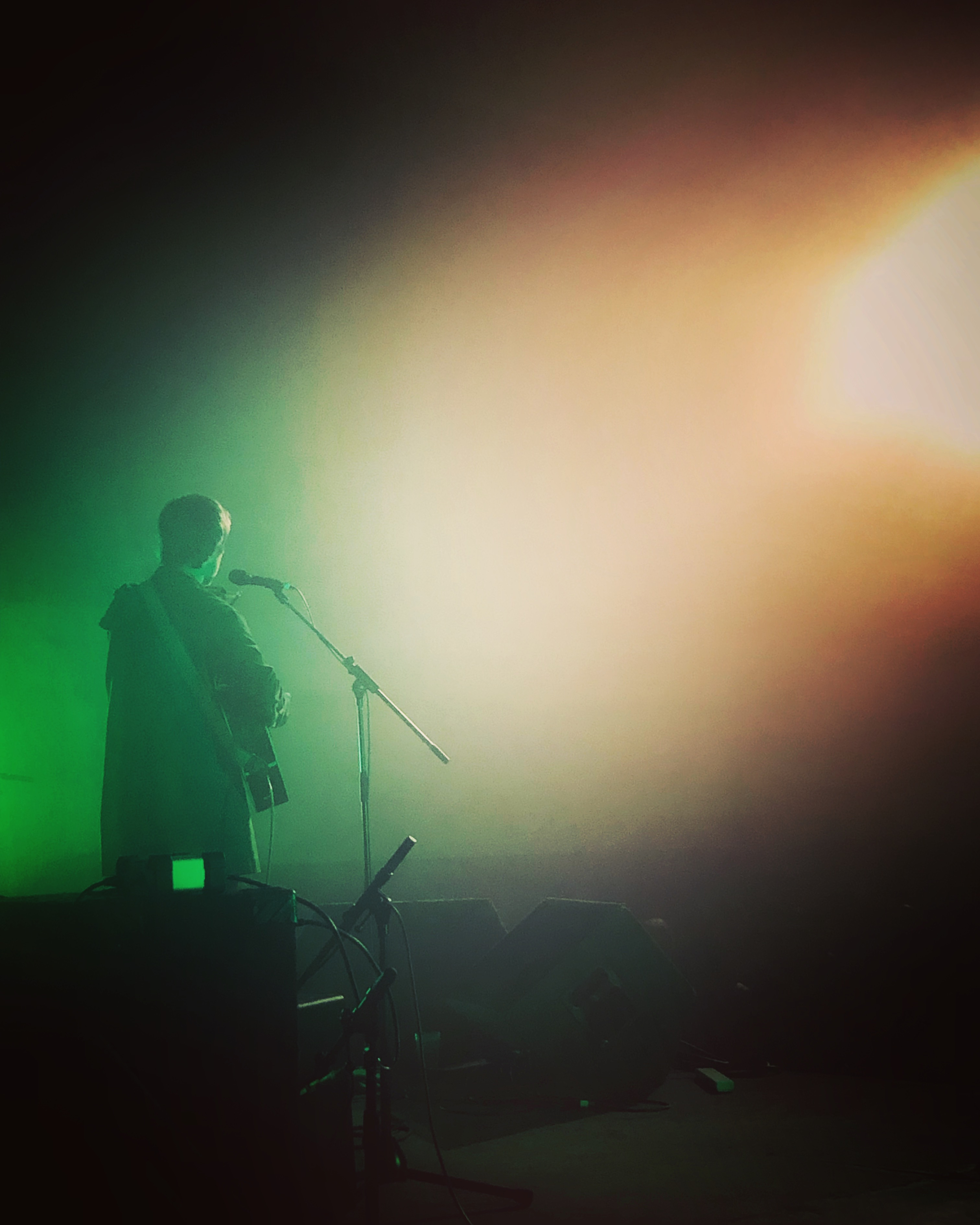

Background information
- Origin: Lurgan, County Armagh, Northern Ireland
- Genres: alternative folk, indie, alt rock, americana
- Years active: 2005–present
- Labels: Bad Paw, Twenty30, Rollercoaster, Style
- Website: malojian.bandcamp.com

Malojian is the musical solo project of Stevie Scullion, a Northern Irish singer-songwriter and founder of independent record label Style Records.

== Biography ==
2012's The Deer's Cry was recorded in Start Together Studios, Oh Yeah Music Centre, Belfast, The Freak Farm, Dromore and Millbank Studio, Lisburn. It received critical acclaim upon release and featured on BBC Radio 2 Bob Harris Sunday, where Malojian played a live set, to which Harris stated, "I love your music"

2015's Southlands was recorded at Millbank Studios, Lisburn and Malojian played at set on BBC Radio 6 Cerys Matthews show The single "Communion Girls" received extensive airtime on Irish and UK radio stations featuring on BBC Radio 6 Music, BBC Radio Scotland Ricky Ross, RTE Radio and BBC Radio Ulster amongst others

2016's This Is Nowhere was recorded at Electrical Audio by Steve Albini and a documentary filmed by photographer Colm Laverty, Document: a Film About Malojian was released on YouTube and follows the recording of the album.

2017's Let Your Weirdness Carry You Home, partly recorded in Rathlin Island East Lighthouse and 2020's Humm, features Joey Waronker (Beck, R.E.M., Roger Waters, Atoms For Peace) on drums and percussion, Gerry Love (Teenage Fanclub) on bass and Jon Thorne (Yorkston, Thorne & Khan; Lamb).

2020's Humm was partly co-written and co-produced with Jason Lytle of Grandaddy. Lytle and Scullion previously completed a UK and Irish collaborative tour in the summer of 2019. Collaborating over the internet with Lytle, bouncing ideas back and forth, the album title refers to the transatlantic cable on Foilhummeran Bay on Valentia Island off the coast of Ireland.

Southlands, This Is Nowhere, Let Your Weirdness Carry You Home, and Humm were short-listed for the Northern Ireland Music Prize Album of the Year.

== Discography ==
=== Studio albums ===
- The Deer's Cry (2012)
- Southlands (Twenty30, 2015)
- This is Nowhere (Rollercoaster Records, 2016)
- Let Your Weirdness Carry You Home (Rollercoaster Records, 2017)
- humm (Style Records, 2020)

=== EPs ===
- The Broken Deer EP (self-released, 2012)
- The Simple Life EP (self-released, 2013)

=== Singles ===
- "Communion Girls" (2015)
- "Ambulance Song / Beardness" (2018)
