= Quiet (MILCK song) =

Song by MILCK
- Published: MILCK
- Released: 2017

"Quiet" is a feminist anthem co-written, co-produced, and performed by Los Angeles-based singer-songwriter MILCK. It received national attention after she organized a capella performances of the song at the 2017 Women's March in Washington D.C., after which she made the sheet music publicly available and organized further activity around the song.

The lyrical structure of the song breaks with the most common pop music song structure, taking the form of verse, pre-chorus, chorus, pre-chorus, chorus, bridge, chorus.

== History ==
MILCK wrote "Quiet" with her co-writer Adrianne “AG” Gonzalez in 2015. While the song draws on the artist’s adolescent experiences of domestic violence, depression, and anorexia, it was inspired by “a nightmare in which she was being assaulted and a bystander in her dream told her she just had to stay quiet until it was over.”

MILCK organized 26 singers from various choirs around the U.S. into the #ICANTKEEPQUIET chorus, to perform an a cappella version of her song flash mob style during the 2017 Women’s March in Washington, D.C. One performance with the singers from the GW Sirens & Capital Blend went viral on the internet; MILCK was praised for having authored the “unofficial anthem” of the Women’s March. Within a week, MILCK and other performers reprised the Women's March version on the television show Full Frontal with Samantha Bee.

In response to the attention given to "Quiet" as a result of the Women's March, MILCK publicized the song on Twitter using the hashtag #ICANTKEEPQUIET. This was intended to allow people to share their stories and access the sheet music for the a cappella version for free, so that they could create their own #ICANTKEEPQUIET choirs.

== Personnel ==
- MILCK – composer, lead vocals
- Adrianne Gonzalez – composer, background vocals
- Rod Castro – guitar
- Matt Chamberlain – drums
- Patricia Bahia - background vocals
- Kyler England - background vocals
- Keely Bumford - background vocals
- Dia Frampton - background vocals
- Mary Osborne - background vocals
- Iljeoma Njaka - background vocals
- Sophia Dion - background vocals
- Hungarian Studio Orchestra - orchestra
