= I Am Woman (Emmy Meli song) =

Single by Emmy Meli
- Released: November 18, 2021
- Length: 3:52
- Label: Disruptor; Arista
- Songwriter: Emily Catherine Lomeli
- Producer: Okano

Emmy Meli singles chronology
"Matrix" (2021)	"I Am Woman" (2021)

"I Am Woman" is a song by American singer Emmy Meli, released on November 18, 2021, through Arista and Disruptor Records. The song went viral on video sharing app TikTok. The song has been described as a feminist anthem promoting a positive self-image.

== Background ==
Emmy Meli is a singer from California who gained popularity after posting the song to TikTok, where it has over 22 million views. Meli says she wrote the song to "empower women" and called seeing the song resonate with listeners "the most amazing and beautiful thing" she has experienced.

== Commercial performance ==
The song first charted inside the top 75 of the UK Singles Chart at number 67 on 7 January 2022 after amassing a sales total of 5,789 units.

== Charts ==
Chart performance for "I Am Woman"
Chart (2021–2023)	Peak position
Australia (ARIA)	28
Austria (Ö3 Austria Top 40)	63
Belgium (Ultratop 50 Flanders)	48
Canada (Canadian Hot 100)	55
Germany (GfK)	73
Global 200 (Billboard)	56
Hungary (Single Top 40)	36
Ireland (IRMA)	60
Lithuania (AGATA)	46
Netherlands (Single Top 100)	82
New Zealand (Recorded Music NZ)	15
Portugal (AFP)	69
Romania (Romanian Radio Airplay)	8
San Marino (SMRRTV Top 50)	10
Sweden (Sverigetopplistan)	99
Switzerland (Schweizer Hitparade)	50
UK Singles (OCC)	63
US Billboard Hot 100	74
US Mainstream Top 40 (Billboard)	28

== Certifications ==
Certifications for "I Am Woman"
Region	Certification	Certified units/sales
Australia (ARIA)	Gold	35,000^{‡}
Austria (IFPI Austria)	Gold	15,000^{‡}
Canada (Music Canada)	Platinum	80,000^{‡}
New Zealand (RMNZ)	Platinum	30,000^{‡}
Switzerland (IFPI Switzerland)	Gold	10,000^{‡}
United Kingdom (BPI)	Silver	200,000^{‡}
United States (RIAA)	Platinum	1,000,000^{‡}
^{‡} Sales+streaming figures based on certification alone.

== Release history ==
Release history for "I Am Woman"
Region	Date	Format	Label	Ref.
Various	November 18, 2021	Digital download; streaming	Arista; Disruptor	
United States	January 18, 2022	Contemporary hit radio	Arista	
Italy	January 21, 2022	Contemporary hit radio	Sony	
