= LasTesis =

Feminist artist performance collective

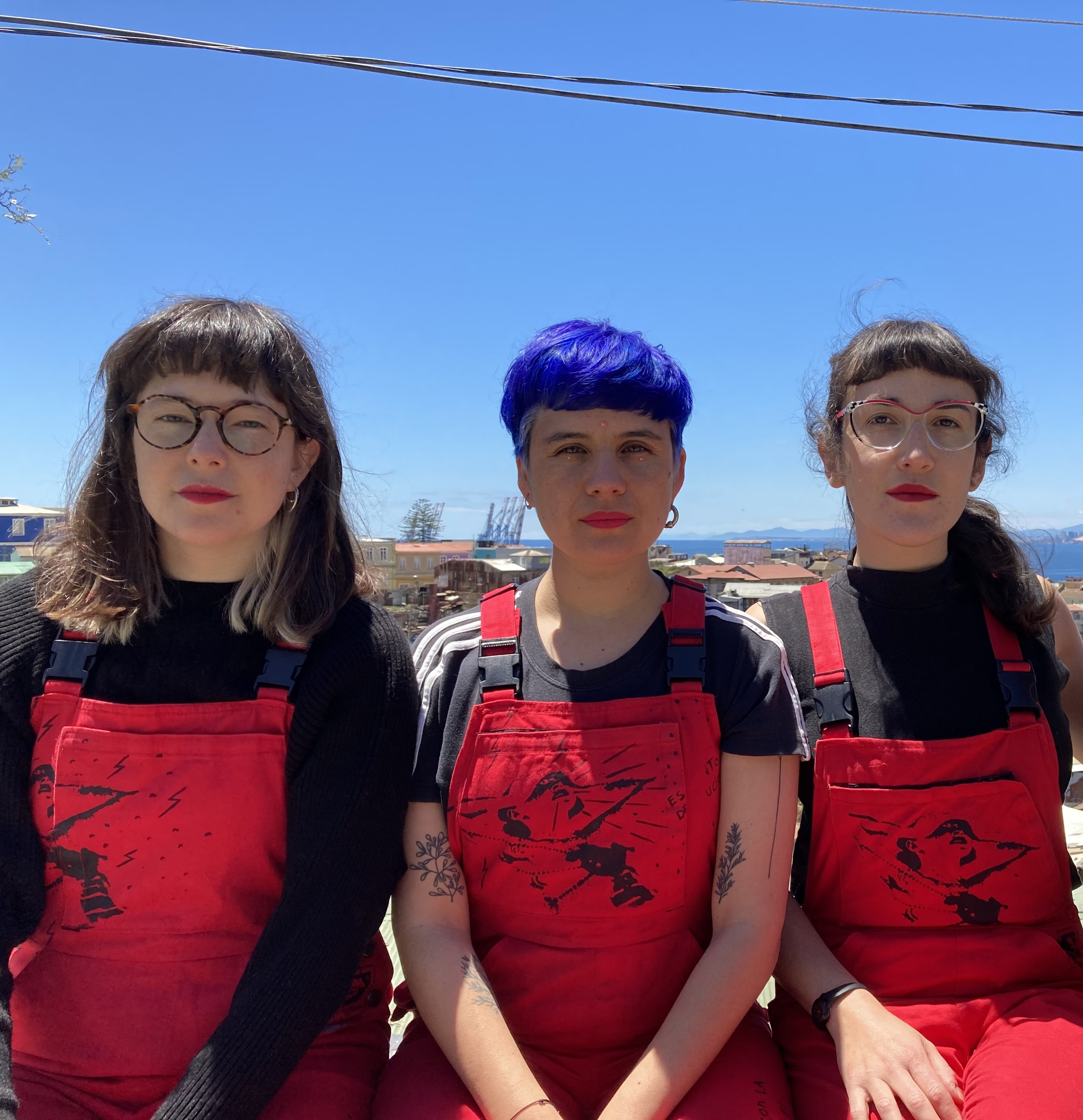
LASTESIS in 2020.

LASTESIS (styled all in capital letters) are a Chilean interdisciplinary, intersectional and trans-inclusive feminist collective, whose members are Sibila Sotomayor Van Rysseghem, Daffne Valdés Vargas and Paula Cometa Stange. Sotomayor and Valdés are from a theater background, while Cometa from a background in design and history. The collective’s name embodies the group's interest in promoting the tesis (theses) of important feminist thinkers, such as Silvia Federici and Rita Segato, in their performances. LASTESIS direct their performances toward institutionalized sexual violence against women committed by police, government officials, and other systems of power. An important component of LASTESIS’ anti-patriarchal art is their choreography: distinct movements that transition as each song unfolds in front of the audience and which engage the audience.

The collective is most prominently known for their performance of “Un Violador en tu Camino” (A Rapist in Your Path), a song with accompanying choreography that was first staged in front of a police station by a small group during a protest on 20 November 2019 in Valparaíso, Chile, and then on 25 November in Santiago, Chile, as part of International Day for the Elimination of Violence Against Women demonstrations. The performance was then replicated across Latin America and other Spanish-speaking countries, and spread all over the world: London, Berlin, Paris, Madrid, Barcelona, Tel Aviv, New Delhi, Tokyo, Beirut, Istanbul, Mexico City, Caracas, Lima, Buenos Aires, among other places. In Manhattan, according to The Associated Press, it caused “a commotion so loud that it could be heard in a 15th-floor courtroom.” It has been performed in over 200 locations globally. The performance was influenced by Argentine feminist anthropologist Rita Segato's studies on rape. It also drew from statistics for sexual assault in Chile, “where only 8% of resolved sexual-assault cases in 2018 ended up in some sort of conviction against the perpetrator, according to government statistics compiled by the Chilean Network Against Violence Against Women.”

== Origins ==
The collective was formed in 2018 with the aim of engaging feminist theory, or "tesis" (thesis), through art. Their name, LASTESIS, or "the (feminine) thesis," derives from the group’s drive to promote a feminist thesis and the theses by feminist thinkers. Group members have said that their performances are conceived as an attempt to translate feminist theories into a format that would be accessible to those who would not ordinarily encounter them. “Our interventions are only 15 minutes long, the idea is for it to be like that, precise, concise and effective.” Their first performance was influenced by the writings of Italian feminist Silvia Federici and their second by the works of Argentine feminist anthropologist and decolonial thinker Rita Segato.

== Notable performances ==
"Patriarcado y Capital es alianza criminal" ("Patriarchy and Capital are a Criminal Alliance"), the first performance by LASTESIS, was performed in halls, academic venues and parties. It was based on Silvia Federici's book Caliban and the Witch: Women, the Body and Primitive Accumulation (2004), which explores the history of witch hunts and the murder of hundreds of thousands of women in America and Europe. Through their performance, LASTESIS ask: "How is our economic system linked to the exploited bodies of women?" At moments, performing movements inspired by Jane Fonda’s aerobics videos.

“Un Violador en tu Camino” (A Rapist in Your Path), a song with accompanying choreography that was first staged in front of a police station by a small group during a protest on 20 November 2019 in Valparaíso, Chile. The performance was influenced by Argentine feminist anthropologist Rita Segato's studies on rape. It also drew from statistics for sexual assault in Chile, “where only 8% of resolved sexual-assault cases in 2018 ended up in some sort of conviction against the perpetrator, according to government statistics compiled by the Chilean Network Against Violence Against Women.”

LASTESIS performed “Un Violador en tu Camino” in Valparaíso with 50 women and people from the LGBTQIA+ community on 20 November 2019 as part of an intervention with the artistic collective, Fuego Acciones en Cemento (FAEC) in their series of public interventions Barricadas Escénicas (Theatrical Barricades). Barricadas Escenicas was a series of public interventions in which the group would barricade streets and walkways with brief public performances. It was "part of a series of 'barricades,' in the sense of the artistic barricades that interrupt people's day-to-day life – not with fire or physical structures, like a usual barricade, but through art."

In September 2022, at the Theater Spektakel festival in Zurich, LASTESIS gave a 4-day workshop and staged their performance RESISTENCIA o la reivindicación de un derecho colectivo (RESISTANCE or the vindication of a collective right) with more than 30 local participants. The performance sought to translate ideas from Judith Butler, Paul B. Preciado and María Lugones, through a theatrical device supported by the bodies and experiences of the participants. In the antagonism between repression and pleasure, death and party, denunciation and resistance, the performance addressed the claim of the right to a life free of violence in a context of colonization and active extractivism. They have toured with RESISTENCIA in Chile, México, Spain, Germany and The Netherlands.

== Ideology ==
The central idea to LASTESIS is resistance through experience, through the individual body becoming part of a collective body. Even though they delve into difficult and horrifying subjects (political and sexual violence, femicides, street harassment), they believe in the importance of celebration and fun as an integral component to resistance, that it is a communal effort that is important to enjoy, to have fun together, and to preserve this atmosphere of joy and party because they are resisting together through their bodies, stating "our bodies are territories of oppressions and institutional forms of violence, which of course affect us in different ways. But they are also the primary foundations of a collective body that resists.

Members of the LASTESIS collective explain:

“We feel part of an underground network of women and dissidences that do not answer to national, cultural or idiomatic borders. This power is something beautiful, a true gift. Yet at the same time it shows that the problem is transversal, that sexual violence, and all violence stemming from the patriarchy, is global. Art is the trench of struggle and resistance we have chosen and do not tire of saying so. We believe in the transformative potential of art and performance, of art from bodies and for male and female bodies, collectiviZed art, appropriated through common experiences.”

This format of resistance may have had concrete structural impact when on 4 March 2020 both houses of the Chilean congress passed a constitutional reform establishing gender parity for conventional delegates elections. The debate in the Chilean Congress on gender parity reform coincided with the worldwide phenomenon of LASTESIS and their powerful performance “A Rapist in Your Way” (Un violador en tu camino).

On 28 May 2020, LASTESIS performed and published a manifesto against global police violence, co-authored with Pussy Riot. The manifesto was translated into English was a collaboration between Moira Santoro (a Mexico-based member of Pussy Riot) and the members of LASTESIS. The two groups, represented by five masked women in the video, “call on the compañeras, the comrades because as a comandante in the Sierra Maestra once said, a compañero is someone whose lips tremble with rage in the face of injustice committed anywhere on earth” in minutes 6:05–6:20. In her essay titled Anyone Can be Pussy Riot, Jessica Gokberg explains that the groups are arguing that “transnationally collaborative governments are taking advantage of the enforced confinement during the global pandemic to escalate police brutality, army invasions, and the stripping of civil rights. They call on their global audience to take the blatant exertion of militarized government power as a ‘historic moment to set it all on fire’” in minute 4:13 of the video.

In 2021, the collective published Quemar el Miedo (Set Fear on Fire) in print, and in it they outline a queerfeminist and decolonial critique of patriarchal violence based on the unique Latin American experiences of women and gender dissident persons, and in which they declare bodies and performance as the central means of transnational resistance. The book was translated into German (2021, S. Fisher), Italian (2022, Capvolte) and English (2023, Verso books).

== Work ==
=== Performances ===
- Patriarcado y Capital es alianza criminal (Patriarchy and Capital is a Criminal Alliance), 2018
- Un Violador en tu Camino (A Rapist in Your Path), 2019
- The Rapist Is You (2020)
- RESISTANCE or the Vindication of a Collective Right (2021)
- La ciudad del futuro (The City of the Future) collaboration with Delight Lab (2022)
- Canciones para cocinar (work in progress 2022-2023).

=== Books ===
- Antología Feminista. Penguin RandomHouse DEBATE series, 2021
- Quemar el miedo. Planeta, 2021
- Set Fear on Fire (English translation by Camila Valle). Verso, 2022
- About Wild Capitalism & its Patriarchal Performance in Our Lives (in Why Theatre? Golden Book, NTGent, 2020)
- Polifonías Feministas (2022, Random House).

=== Awards ===
- Jaime Castillo Velasco Award from the Chilean Human Rights Commission (2020)
- Design of the Year Award, digital category, The Design Museum, UK (2020)
- The TIME100: Most Influential People 2020.

== Legal Problems ==
On May 27, 2020, they collaborated with Russian feminist art collective Pussy Riot on a video titled "Manifesto Against Police Violence / RIOT x LASTESIS." Ironically, their message resulted in an immediate backlash from Chilean authorities. After the video was published, the police sued LASTESIS for allegedly "inciting violence" against their institution. On 6 June 2020 Carabineros de Chile filed a complaint against the collective. Police claimed to have felt intimidated and fearful of attacks after the performance outside a police station. When asked for more evidence by the prosecutor, they investigated "Un violador en tu camino," which resulted in a second lawsuit filed with what the police felt was "stronger evidence" of hate speech.

colectivo LASTESIS commented the following about the case:

“They want us in the kitchen, confined to the tedium of the domestic, to the private sphere, silenced, invisible. They want to make us return to that place of subordination to which we have historically been confined”, adding that “This only demonstrates the systematic abuse of power by this institution, equating poetry with the true violence which they perpetrate, denying the space to metaphors, art, activism and the legitimate denounce that since October the people have been shouting everywhere.”

On 4 January 2021, Judge Ingrid Alveal dismissed the case against LASTESIS, specifying the artistic nature of the collective and confirming that there was no evidence linking the group and their statements to violence against the police.

In response to the verdict LASTESIS expressed hope that no other artistic group or performer in Chile would face legal proceedings because of their work, stating “We also hope that public resources will be invested in fighting against the impunity of sexual abusers, rapists.”
