= Soak (singer) =

Northern Irish singer-songwriter

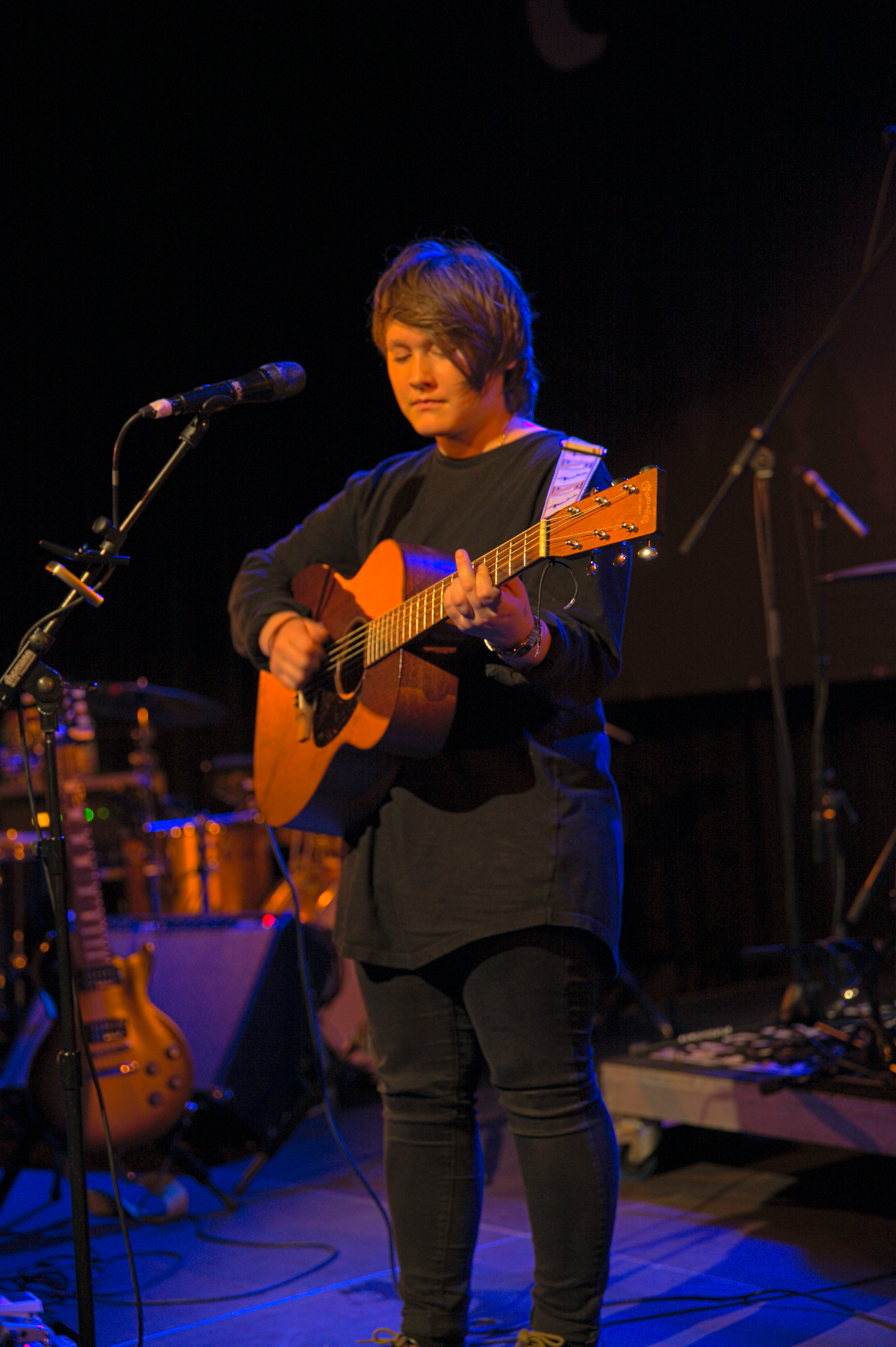
- Soak at the Way Back When festival, 2015

Background information
- Born: Bridie Monds-Watson; 2 May 1996 (age 30); Derry, Northern Ireland
- Genres: Indie folk, dream pop
- Occupations: Singer; songwriter
- Instruments: Vocals, guitar
- Years active: 2013–present
- Label: Rough Trade
- Website: soakmusic.co.uk

Bridie Monds-Watson, better known by their stage name Soak, (born May 2, 1996) is an Irish singer-songwriter from Derry, Northern Ireland. Soak's music has been described as 'a vivid portrait of teenage deep-thinking' by The Guardian. They released their debut studio album Before We Forgot How to Dream in May 2015. "Soak" is a phonetic portmanteau of "soul" and "folk".

== Career ==
In November 2014, they were revealed as one of the acts on the BBC Sound of 2015 long list. On 20 January 2015, they released their debut single, "Sea Creatures". They released their debut studio album Before We Forgot How to Dream on 29 May 2015, which won the Irish Choice Music Prize Album of the Year 2015 on 3 March 2016 at the annual awards ceremony held in Vicar Street, Dublin. On 25 January 2022, Soak announced that their third album If I Never Know You Like This Again would be released on 20 May and debuted the single "Last July".

== Personal life ==
Soak is non-binary, and uses they/them pronouns.

== Discography ==
=== Albums ===
Title	Details	Peak chart positions	
Title	Details	IRE	UK
Before We Forgot How to Dream	Released: 29 May 2015; Label: Rough Trade; Format: Digital download, CD, vinyl	19	37
Grim Town	Released: 26 April 2019; Label: Rough Trade; Format: Digital download, CD, vinyl	66	—
If I Never Know You Like This Again	Released: 20 May 2022; Label: Rough Trade; Format: Digital download, CD, vinyl	—	—
Decembers	Release: due December 4, 2026; Label: Rough Trade; Format: Digital download, CD, vinyl	—	—

=== Singles ===
Title	Year	Album
"Blud"	2014	Before We Forgot How to Dream
"B a noBody"	2014	Before We Forgot How to Dream
"Sea Creatures"	2015	Before We Forgot How to Dream
"Digital Witness"	2015	Non-album single
"Reckless Behaviour"	2015	Before We Forgot How to Dream
"I Can't Make You Love Me/Immigrant Song"	2016	Non-album single
"Everybody Loves You"	2018	Grim Town
"Knock Me Off My Feet"	2019	Grim Town
"Valentine Shmalentine"	2019	Grim Town
"Déjà Vu"	2019	Grim Town
"Last July"	2022	If I Never Know You Like This Again
"Swear Jar"	2022	If I Never Know You Like This Again
"Lunch at Dune" (with Gordi)	2024	Lunch at Dune
"Death Valley Fridge Magnet"	2026	Decembers
"Decembers"	2026	Decembers

==== Guest appearances ====
Year	Title	Other artist(s)	Album
"Country Air"	2019	None	MOOMINVALLEY (Official Soundtrack)

== Awards and nominations ==
Year	Organisation	Award	Nominated	Result
2015	Hyundai	Mercury Prize	Before We Forgot How to Dream	Nominated
2015	Oh Yeah	Northern Ireland Music Prize	Before We Forget How to Dream	Won
2015	RTÉ	Choice Music Prize	Before We Forget How to Dream	Won
