= Before We Forgot How to Dream =

Studio album by Soak
- Released: 29 May 2015
- Genres: Indie folk, dream pop
- Length: 42:23
- Label: Rough Trade

Soak chronology
Before We Forgot How to Dream (2015)	Grim Town (2019)

Professional ratings
Aggregate scores
Source	Rating
Metacritic	75/100
Review scores
Source	Rating
AllMusic	3.5/5 stars
Clash	7/10
DIY	4/5 stars
Exclaim!	7/10
NME	4/5 stars

Before We Forgot How to Dream is the debut album by Northern Irish singer/songwriter Soak. The album was released on 29 May 2015 under Rough Trade Records. It was nominated for the 2015 Mercury Music Prize.

It subsequently won the Choice Music Prize on Thursday 3 March 2016.

== Artwork ==
The artwork for the album was provided by Irish artist Jack Coulter. The CD booklet and vinyl sleeve consists of three of Coulter's photographs and two of his original paintings.

The front cover is a photograph of SOAK taken by Joshua Halling.

== Track listing ==
All tracks are written by Bridie Monds-Watson.

No.	Title	Length
1.	"My Brain"	1:03
2.	"B a noBody"	4:48
3.	"Blud"	2:45
4.	"Wait"	3:58
5.	"Sea Creatures"	3:12
6.	"A Dream to Fly"	0:57
7.	"24 Windowed House"	3:58
8.	"Garden"	3:10
9.	"Shuvels"	3:25
10.	"Hailstones Don't Hurt"	3:09
11.	"Reckless Behaviour"	3:16
12.	"If Everyone Is Someone – No One Is Everyone"	1:04
13.	"Oh Brother"	4:28
14.	"Blind"	2:20

== Charts ==
Chart performance for Before We Forgot How to Dream
Chart (2015)	Peak position
Irish Albums (IRMA)	19
UK Albums (Official Charts)	37
