= HimToo movement =

Reaction to the MeToo movement

#HimToo is a social movement supporting male victims of sexual assault and false rape allegations. The reaction to the #MeToo movement started in October 2018 after a tweet from a mother about her son being afraid to date because of a climate of false rape allegations. It rose to greater prominence during the Brett Kavanaugh Supreme Court nomination. The #HimToo movement was a response to the sexual assault allegations from the #MeToo movement.

== History ==
The meaning of the #HimToo hashtag has constantly changed throughout the course of its existence. When it was first used before 2015, #HimToo had no political meaning attached to it. It was simply an acknowledgement to the participation or presence of a male in an activity.

#HimToo first began to carry a political connotation in 2016, although it was still not used for issues regarding rape allegations or gender related issues. Instead, it was a way of showing support for Senator Tim Kaine of Virginia, Hillary Clinton's running-mate in the 2016 United States presidential election. During that time period, the hashtag #ImWithHer referred to Clinton, while #HimToo was connected to Kaine. Eventually, Donald Trump's supporters used the same hashtag #HimToo to criticize Hillary Clinton and Barack Obama, using #LockHerUp followed by #HimToo.

In 2017, #HimToo was used to bring attention to the existence of male sexual assault victims.

Brett Kavanaugh and Christine Blasey Ford testify before the Senate Judiciary Committee (video from Voice of America)

#HimToo became connected with rape allegations following the emergence of the #MeToo movement when a mother in the United States tweeted about her son with the #HimToo hashtag. She claimed that her son, Pieter Hanson, was afraid to go on dates because of false rape allegations. Hanson himself disavowed his mother's tweet, saying that he does not avoid dating for fear of being falsely accused of sexual misconduct, he never has and never will support #HimToo, and that he supports the #MeToo movement. However, the hashtag became increasingly popular for criticizing rape allegations, especially after actress Asia Argento, one of the major leaders of the #MeToo movement, was accused of sexually assaulting actor Jimmy Bennett when he was a minor and paying him $380,000 as part of a nondisclosure settlement.

During the Brett Kavanaugh hearings, the #HimToo hashtag was re-popularized in his defense. People -- particularly men's rights activists -- used the #HimToo hashtag to express support for Kavanaugh and to criticize women who allegedly gave false rape accusations. The hashtag then evolved and became more generally used to defend men against alleged rape accusations. #HimToo became the antithesis to #MeToo and #BelieveHer, with supporters calling for fairness towards men during sexual assault hearings by asserting that men should not be implied as guilty before sexual assault hearings begin.

== #HimToo rally ==
On November 17, 2018, a rally supporting the #HimToo movement hosted by Patriot Prayer member Haley Adams was held in downtown Portland, Oregon. According to Adams, she and about 40 others gathered to show support for men who were victims of false rape allegations, which they blamed on the #MeToo movement. The speakers shared stories of false rape accusations and spoke about other points regarding men's rights. Joey Gibson, the leader of the Patriot Prayer movement, spoke at the #HimToo rally. Many of the rally's attendees and speakers were associated with Gibson and the Patriot Prayer group.

A counter-protest attended by 350 people was held nearby to express their support for victims of sexual assault in light of the #MeToo movement under a banner saying "Survivors are Everywhere". Among the attendees were various different left wing groups including Antifa dressed in "black bloc" outfits, members of the Portland Democratic Socialists of America (DSA), and the group Popular Mobilizations which led a counter-protest rally called #SupportersAreEverywhere.

After the rally, a larger number of counter-protesters chased the protestors. The counter-protesters allegedly started using pepper spray and fireworks, as well as tossing bottles, flares, silly string, and smoke bombs. The police formed a protective wall around the protesters who were left. The opposing rallies ended in six arrests.

== Alternative views ==
Although the #HimToo movement remains largely associated with highlighting the false rape allegations that men have faced, some argue the movement has been used in other ways. During the rise of the #MeToo movement, the #HimToo reclaimed a 2017 meaning of supporting men who have been victims of sexual harassment and violence themselves.

== Criticism ==
The #HimToo movement was criticized for perpetuating myths about false rape allegations. Analysis by Vox found that 0.005% of American men are falsely accused each year, while a 2018 survey found that 81% of women and 43% of men faced sexual harassment and assault. Women in particular struggle with the myth of #HimToo, as rapes are under-reported and often face disbelief or blame for the assaults. The FBI reports that 8% of rapes are determined to be unfounded, while other studies put the figure as low as 2%. A Netflix documentary, Victim/Suspect (2023), covered the practice of police turning victims into suspects of false allegations. A 2019 Netflix limited series, Unbelievable, was based on a case in which a victim of serial rapist Marc O'Leary was accused of making a false report and coerced into recanting her report by Lynnwood, Washington police. She was awarded $150,000 in a lawsuit against the police department. In 2024, American Nightmare, a docuseries on Netflix, covered the Vallejo, California police department's accusation against a kidnapping and rape victim of perpetrating a hoax; she had been victimized by Matthew Muller.

Critics also claim that the #HimToo movement discourages men who do deal with sexual abuse from coming forward because #HimToo reinforces a gendered dichotomy where men are the accused and women are the accusers. They state that the #HimToo movement discredits the idea that men can be sexually assaulted as well, and casts doubt that those who come forward can be believed.

== See also ==
- "A Scary Time"
- Hashtag activism
- MenToo movement
