= Loud Women =

Music promoter

- Industry: Music promotion
- Genre: Punk, indie rock, indiepop, riot grrrl, electro
- Founded: 2015
- Founder: Cassie Fox
- Headquarters: London, England
- Website: loudwomen.org

Loud Women (stylised in all caps) is a nonprofit music promoter, online zine, festival and record label, established in London in 2015, and focusing on female DIY artists and female-led groups.

Loud Women has received coverage in Louder Than War, Vive Le Rock, God Is in the TV, NME, Clash and Kerrang!

== History ==
Loud Women was established in 2015 by musician Cassie Fox (of the band I, Doris) to address the scarcity of live music opportunities for new female-led bands and female artists on the London music scene, as well as wider issues of representation and equal opportunities in music.

In addition to regular concerts, a Loud Women Fest has been held once a year in London since 2016 (2020 excepted), with Loud Women Fest 9 taking place in 2025.

Loud Women Records was established in 2016 and has released five various artists compilation albums: in 2016, 2019, 2021, 2022 and 2023.

In 2017 Loud Women inaugurated the annual 'HERcury' award for best album by a UK female music band/artist. The award has so far been presented to the Menstrual Cramps (2017), ILL (2018), Dream Nails (2019), Nova Twins (2020), Lilith Ai (2021), Petrol Girls (2022), Big Joanie (2023), Problem Patterns (2024) and Lambrini Girls (2025).

In May 2021, Loud Women released a charity single, "Reclaim These Streets", written by Cassie Fox with additional lyrics performed by Brix Smith, to raise awareness of violence against women, following the eponymous campaign protesting the death of Sarah Everard. All profits from the sale of the track went to Women's Aid. The recording featured over sixty vocalists and musicians including Siobhan Fahey, Debbie Googe, Charley Stone, Debbie Smith, Laura Kidd and members of KaitO, Salad, Scarce, Sidi Bou Said, Hagar the Womb, Big Joanie, Desperate Journalist, Dream Nails, Petrol Girls, the Tuts and the Chefs. The song reached #3 in the iTunes alternative chart.

Initially active solely in London, Loud Women has since opened chapters in the US, Australia, Canada and Ireland, as well as hosting events elsewhere in the UK such as Hastings and Brighton.
