= Milck =

American singer

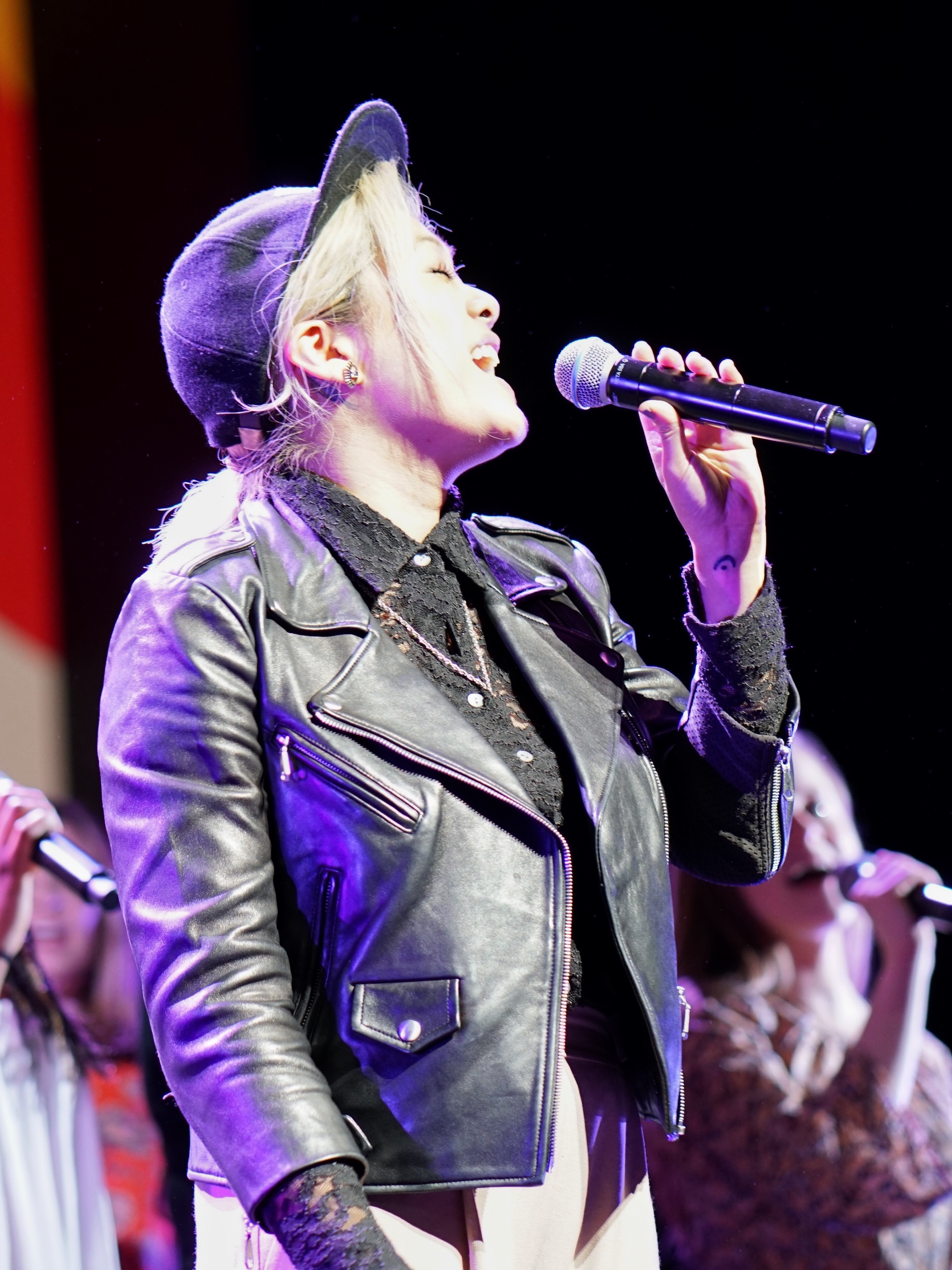
- Milck performing at the Women in the World in 2017
- Born: Connie Kimberly Lim; May 29, 1986 (age 40); Los Angeles County, California, U.S.
- Occupations: Singer; songwriter
- Musical career
- Origin: California, United States
- Genre: Pop
- Label: Atlantic

Connie Kimberly Lim (born May 29, 1986), professionally known as Milck (stylized as MILCK), is an American singer from California. She initially performed as an independent artist for several years, and rose to widespread attention after a video of a performance of her song "Quiet" at the 2017 Women's March became popular, and became embraced as a feminist anthem for the movement. She was eventually signed to Atlantic Records, and released her debut EP This Is Not The End in 2018.

Milck's second EP, Into Gold, was released in early 2020, preceded by the lead single "If I Ruled the World". She released another protest song later that year, "Somebody's Beloved", in collaboration with British songwriter Bipolar Sunshine.

== Early life ==
Lim was raised in Palos Verdes near Los Angeles, California. She enrolled as a child in classical piano and opera class, and composed her first work "Healthy People" at age seven. She was the child of immigrants from Hong Kong, with one sister and one brother. Her father paid his way through medical school by "flipping burgers". She was successful at school and was homecoming queen, but struggled with anorexia.

She attended UC Berkeley studying pre-medicine, where she joined the a cappella group Golden Overtones, and started a band. She eventually dropped out of college and continued to perform as an independent artist for eight years. She signed to a record label and appeared on the first season of the television show The Voice. She was however eventually dropped by her management.

Lim assumed the stage name Milck, based on her first two initials and her last name backwards.

== Career ==
Milck's career largely got its start at the 2017 Women's March in Washington D.C. She had written the song "Quiet" in 2015 along with Adrianne Gonzalez, as a way of coping with sexual assault and abuse as a teenager. Prior to the march she put out requests for female a cappella groups to help perform the song at the event, a call that was answered by groups Capital Blend and GW Sirens from George Washington University. Milck separately recorded each vocal part, and sent them individually to the participants, due to the logistical difficulties involved in rehearsing in-person. Along with 26 other singers, she performed seven times throughout the march among the crowd, where it was recorded by film maker Alma Ha'rel, who uploaded the video to social media where it had 8 million views in two days, and shared by a number of well-known celebrities. (Note: In their review of the song's impact two years later, National Public Radio high listed shares of the video on social media by Emma Watson, Debra Messing and Tom Morello.) The group was then invited to perform on the television show Full Frontal with Samantha Bee. The song was named the number one protest song of 2017 by Billboard, and was widely embraced as an anthem for the movement. The same year she performed the song with Choir! Choir! Choir! at the Phoenix Concert Theatre in Toronto, with proceed from the event donated to the American Civil Liberties Union.

In 2018, Milck returned to the Women's March to perform "Quiet". She also released her debut EP This Is Not The End EP, which she promoted with a performance on The Today Show. The same year she was invited to perform at the Save the Children's Illumination Gala, at the American Museum of Natural History. She recorded a cover of the Five Stairsteps song "O-o-h Child", which was used in an ad campaign by Procter & Gamble related to the 2018 Winter Olympics.

In 2019, Milck released the song "If I Ruled the World", positioned as the lead single of her upcoming EP Into Gold. The song is about fixing global problems; Milck said, "it’s far more empowering and energizing when we encourage people to imagine the world they want, rather than when we focus on cursing the parts of the world we don’t want to see." Into Gold was released on February 21, 2020. Milck said that the album shows the process of grief and rebirth after the end of a five-year relationship—"the man I thought I was going to marry"—to turn "pain into power".

Milck responded to the 2020 killing of Breonna Taylor, the murder of George Floyd, and other indications of rising police brutality by writing another protest song: "Somebody's Beloved". She collaborated with UK musician Bipolar Sunshine who added the lyric, "Blood on leaves falling like autumn, her story's been told a thousand times. Why doesn't everybody scream?" Sunshine aimed to have "Somebody's Beloved" recall the 1937 song "Strange Fruit", made famous by Billie Holiday. Tom Shadyac directed a video for the song.

In 2025 it was announced that Milck and Gonzalez were collaborating on the score for a new musical, The Family Album. The show is scheduled to premiere at the La Jolla Playhouse in the summer of 2026.

== Discography ==
- This Is Not The End (2018)

== See also ==
- Me Too movement
