= Rita Laura Segato =

Argentine-Brazilian academic

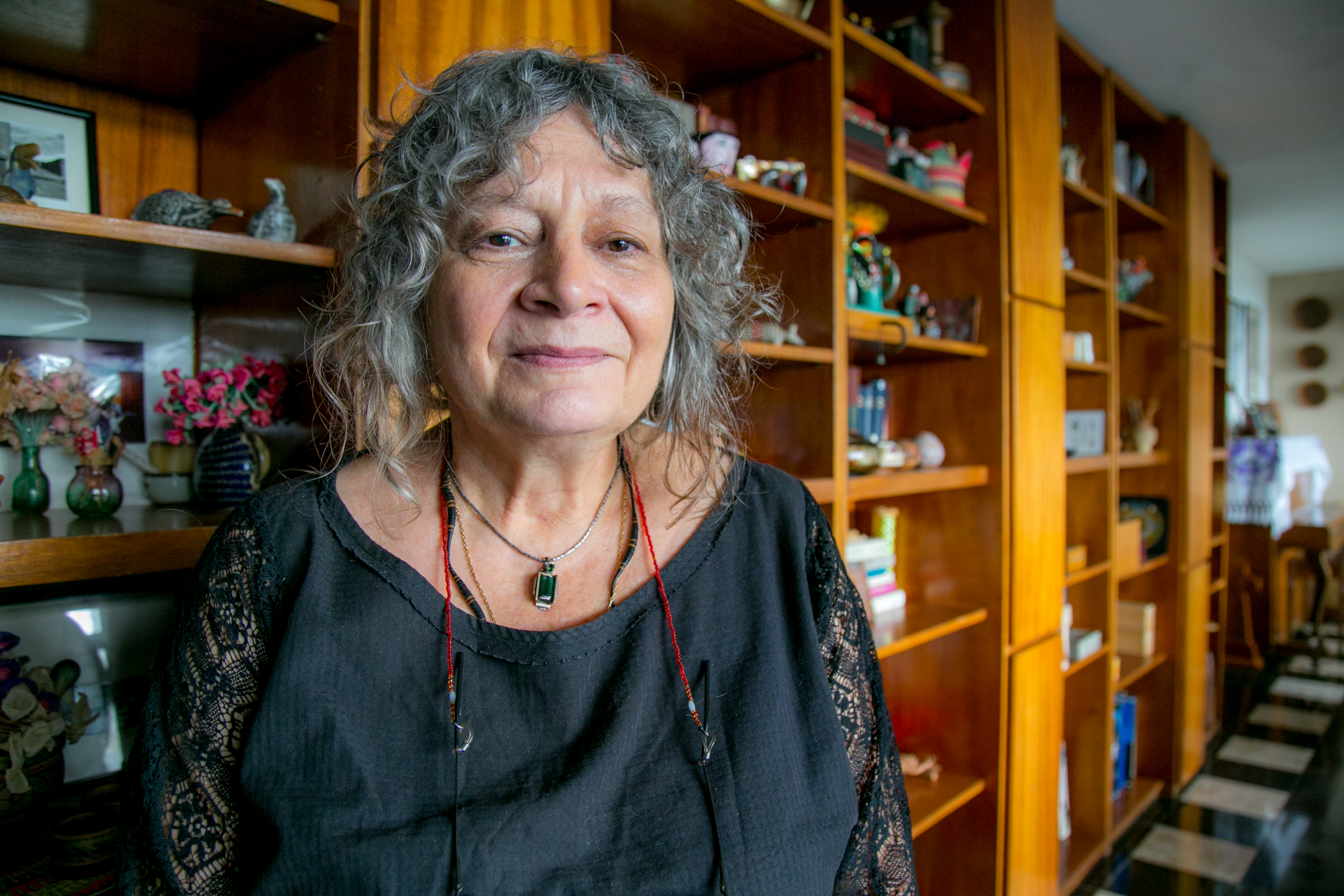
- Segato in 2018
- Born: Rita Laura Segato; August 14, 1951 (age 74); Buenos Aires, Argentina
- Scientific career
- Fields: Anthropology

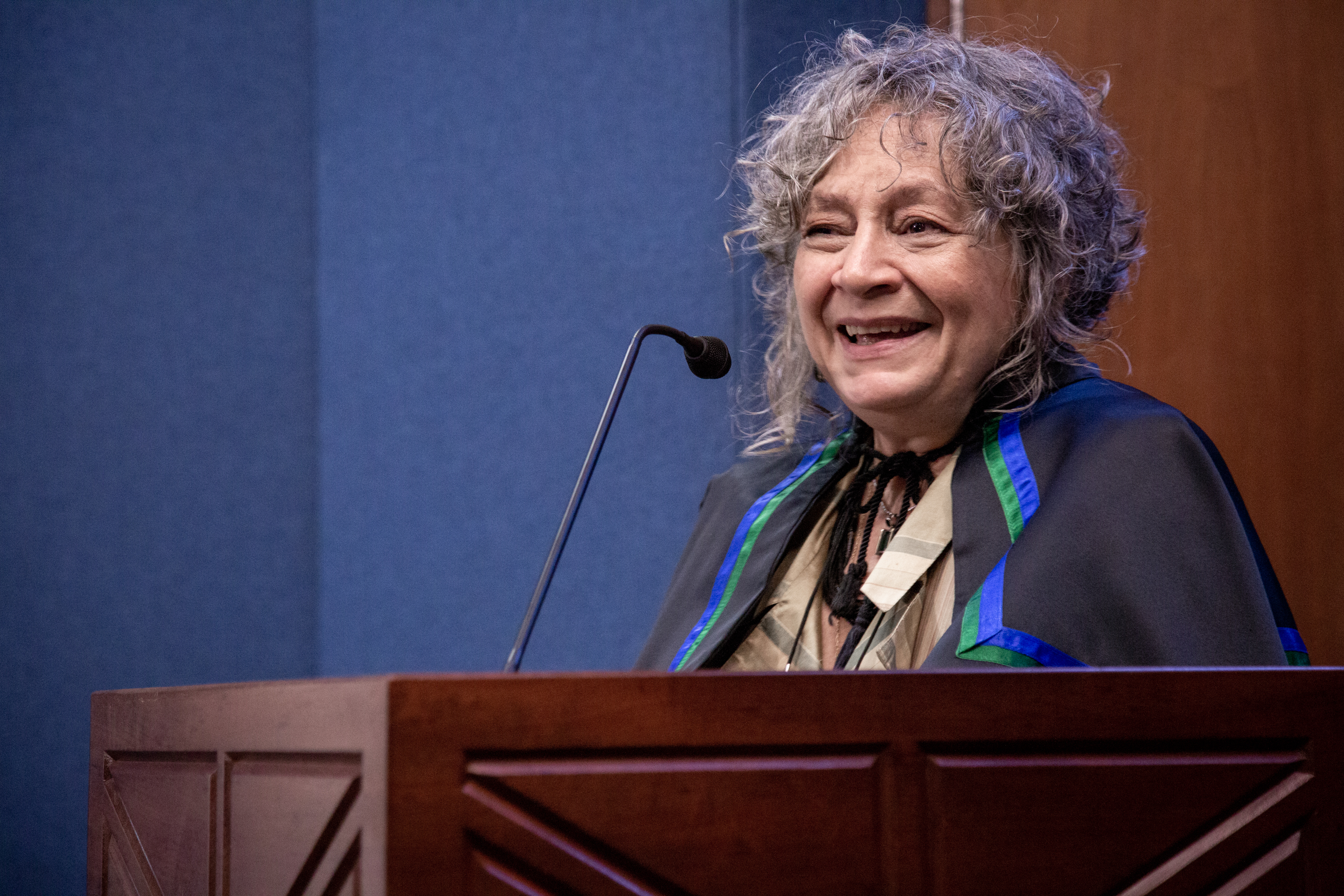
Segato speaks in 2018 at the University of Brasília

Rita Laura Segato (born 14 August 1951) is an Argentine-Brazilian academic, who has been called "one of Latin America's most celebrated feminist anthropologists" and "one of the most lucid feminist thinkers of this era". She is specially known for her research oriented towards gender in indigenous villages and Latin American communities, violence against women and the relationships between gender, racism and colonialism. One of her specialist areas is the study of gender violence.

Segato was born in Buenos Aires and educated at the Instituto Interamericano de Etnomusicología y Folklore de Caracas. She has an MA and a PhD in anthropology (1984) from Queens University, Belfast. She teaches Anthropology at the University of Brasília, where she holds the UNESCO Chair of Anthropology and Bioethics; since 2011 she has taught on the Postgraduate Programme of Bioethics and Human Rights. She additionally carries out research on behalf of Brazil's National Council for Scientific and Technological Development.

In 2016, along with Prudencio García Martínez, Segato was an expert witness in the Sepur Zarco case, in which senior officers at a military base in Guatemala were convicted of crimes against humanity as a result of the holding of fourteen women in sexual and domestic slavery. The defence tried to challenge the expertise of the witnesses, but their appeal was unsuccessful. Her works were an inspiration to the Chilean collective LASTESIS from Valparaíso for the song and performance A Rapist in Your Path, which was performed by women throughout America Europe and Australia.

== Awards and Recognitions ==
- Premio Latinoamericano y Caribeño de Ciencias Sociales CLACSO 50 Años (2017)
- Honorary degree granted by the Universidad Autónoma de Entre Ríos (2018)
- Honorary degree granted by the Universidad Nacional de Salta (2018)
- Honorary degree granted by the University of El Salvador (2021)

== Publications ==
- Santos e Daimones. O politeísmo afrobrasileiro e a tradição arquetipal. Editora da Universidade de Brasília. 1995.
- Las Estructuras Elementales de la Violencia. Ensayos sobre género entre la antropología, el psicoanálisis y los Derechos Humanos. Prometeo - Universidad Nacional de Quilmes. 2003. ISBN 987-558-018-X. Series: Derechos Humanos. Viejos problemas, nuevas miradas Dirigida por Baltasar Garzón.
- La nación y sus otros: raza, etnicidad y diversidad religiosa en tiempos de políticas de la identidad. Prometeo Libros. 2007. ISBN 978-987-574-155-3.
- Los presos hablan sobre los derechos humanos en la cárcel. La Grieta, por Donde Asoma la Palabra. 2009. ISBN 978-987-25040-0-7. Co-authored with Rodolfo Brardinelli and Claudia Cesaroni
- La escritura en el cuerpo de las mujeres asesinadas en Ciudad Juárez. Tinta Limón. 2013. ISBN 978-987-27390-4-1.
- L’Oedipe Noir (París: Petite Bibliothèque Payot, editorial Payot et Rivages, 2014)
- Las nuevas formas de la guerra y el cuerpo de las mujeres (México, DF: Pez en el Árbol, 2014)
- Reinventar la izquierda en el siglo XXI. Universidad Nacional de General Sarmiento. 2014. ISBN 978-987-630-192-3. (Obra colectiva)
- Aníbal Quijano: textos de fundación. Del Signo. 2014. ISBN 978-987-3784-04-0. (Co-authored)
- Des/decolonizar la universidad. Del Signo. 2015. ISBN 978-987-3784-16-3. (Co-authored)
- Genealogías críticas de la colonialidad en América Latina, África, Oriente. CLACSO. 2016. ISBN 978-987-722-157-2. (Co-authored)
- Construir estrategias para erradicar la violencia de género. Al Margen. 2016. ISBN 978-987-618-224-9. (Co-authored)
- La crítica de la colonialidad en ocho ensayos. Prometeo Libros. 2016. ISBN 978-987-574-825-5.
- La guerra contra las mujeres. Tinta Limón - Traficantes de sueños. 2017. ISBN 978-987-3687-26-6.
- Mujeres intelectuales : feminismos y liberación en América Latina y el Caribe. Consejo Latinoamericano de Ciencias Sociales - CLACSO. 2017. ISBN 978-987-722-247-0. (Co-authored)
- Más allá del decenio de los pueblos afrodescendientes. Consejo Latinoamericano de Ciencias Sociales - CLACSO. 2017. ISBN 978-987-722-267-8. (Co-authored)
- Contrapedagogías de la crueldad. Prometeo Libros. 2018. ISBN 978-987-574-911-5.
