= Joshua Burnside =

- Born: Joshua Burnside; 11 July 1989 (age 36); Lisbane, Northern Ireland
- Genres: Indie folk, folktronica, indie rock
- Occupation: Musician
- Instruments: Electric guitar, banjo, accordion, piano
- Years active: 2012–present
- Website: www.joshuaburnside.com

Joshua Burnside (born 11 July 1989) is a Northern Irish folk singer-songwriter based in Belfast. His music incorporates elements of Irish folk, and Scottish folk rock, Americana, world music, sound collage and electronica. His debut album Ephrata was written in Colombia and incorporates Cumbian rhythms, as well as Colombian-inspired lyrical themes referencing the likes of Jaime Garzón. Ephrata was awarded the Northern Ireland Music Prize Best Album award in 2017. Culture Northern Ireland have compared Burnside's musical style to that of Elliott Smith, Nick Drake, and Tom Waits, all of whom he has noted as personal inspirations.

== Radio success ==
The three singles from Ephrata, "Blood Drive", "Tunnels, Pt. 2", and "Holllllogram", have had notable success on BBC 6 Music. Burnside's music has been featured on BBC 6 Music Recommends and received spot plays and praise from presenters Lauren Laverne, Guy Garvey, Steve Lamacq, and Tom Ravenscroft, as well as from BBC Radio 1 presenters Huw Stephens and Phil Taggart.

== Nominations and notable appearances ==
In September 2018, Burnside's single "A Man of High Renown" from the EP All Round the Light Said was shortlisted for the Northern Ireland Music Prize Best Single.

He has performed at a number of international festivals including The Great Escape Festival, Other Voices, Reeperbahn Festival, and South by Southwest. Ahead of his first-ever appearances in America at South By Southwest in March 2018, "Holllllogram" attracted the attention of NPR.

Burnside was the Artist in Residence at the Cathedral Quarter Arts Festival 2018. In this role, he opened for the likes of Bedouine, King Creosote, Shirley Collins, and This Is the Kit.

== Discography ==
=== Albums ===
Title	Details
Ephrata	Release: 5 May 2017; Label: Quiet Arch Records (QA005); Format: Digital download, CD, LP
Wear Bluebells in Your Hat If You’re Goin’ That Way	Release: 11 January 2019; Label: self-released; Format: Digital download, LP
Live at the Elmwood Hall	Release: 24 May 2019; Label: Quiet Arch Records (QA0011); Format: Digital download, CD, LP
Into the Depths of Hell	Release: 4 September 2020; Label: Self-released; Format: Digital download, CD, LP
Higher Places	Release: 7 May 2021; Label: Self-released; Format: Digital download, LP
Teeth of Time	Release: 28 February 2025; Label: Self-released; Format: Digital download, LP
It's Not Going to Be Okay	Release: 20 March 2026; Label: Self-released; Format: Digital download, LP

=== EPs ===
Title	Details
The Winding Straits	Release: 11 August 2012; Label: self-released; Format: Digital download
If You're Goin' That Way	Release: 10 July 2013; Label: self-released; Format: Digital download, CD
All Round the Light Said	Release: 5 May 2018; Label: Quiet Arch Records (QA008); Format: Digital download, CD
Far O'er the Sounding Main	Release: 16 April 2020; Label: Self-released; Format: Digital download
All Round the Light Said + Far O'er the Sounding Main	Limited edition double EP re-release.: Release: 5 February 2021; Label: Self-released; Format: Digital download, CD
In the Half-Light	With Laura Quirke: Release: 16 July 2021; Label: Attic Thing Records; Format: Digital download
Late Afternoon in the Meadow (1887)	Release: 18 November 2022; Label: Attic Thing Records; Format: Digital download

=== Singles ===
Year	Title	Album
2013	"Black Dog Sin"	If You're Goin' That Way (EP)
2017	"Red and White Blues"	Red and White Blues
2017	"Blood Drive"	Ephrata
2017	"Tunnels, Pt. 2"	Ephrata
2017	"Holllllogram"	Ephrata
2018	"A Man of High Renown"	All Round the Light Said (EP)
2019	"Desert Wine"	Desert Wine
2019	"The Good Word (Live at the Elmwood Hall)"	Live at the Elmwood Hall
2019	"Grapes (Live at the Elmwood Hall)"	Live at the Elmwood Hall
2019	"Northern Winds (Live at the Elmwood Hall)"	Live at the Elmwood Hall
2020	"Whiskey Whiskey"	Into the Depths of Hell
2020	"The Only Thing I Fear"	Into the Depths of Hell
2020	"And You Evade Him / Born in the Blood"	Into the Depths of Hell
2020	"War on Everything"	Into the Depths of Hell
2021	"Under the Concrete"	Into the Depths of Hell
2021	"Noa Mercier"	Into the Depths of Hell
2021	"Whiskey Whiskey (Demo)"	Higher Places
2021	"Driving Alone in the City at Night (Demo)"	Higher Places
2021	"Taking the Wheel"	In the Half-light
2021	"Far Away the Hills Are Green"	In the Half-light
2022	"Late Afternoon in the Meadow (1887)"	Late Afternoon in the Meadow (1887)
2022	"Rough Edges"	Late Afternoon in the Meadow (1887)
2024	"Marching Round The Ladies / The Good Life"	Teeth of Time
2024	"Ghost of the Bloomfield Road / Good For One Thing"	Teeth of Time
2024	"Up and Down"	Teeth of Time
2025	"Climb the Tower"	Teeth of Time
2025	"Burnout" (Green Day cover)	In the Bath
2025	"Nicer Part of Town"	It's Not Going to Be Okay
2025	"Moon High"	It's Not Going to Be Okay
2026	"Something Else"	It's Not Going to Be Okay
2026	"The Last Armchair"	It's Not Going to Be Okay
