= If I Never Know You Like This Again =

Studio album by Soak
- Released: 20 May 2022
- Studios: Attica Studios, County Donegal, Ireland
- Length: 43:53
- Label: Rough Trade
- Producer: Tommy McLaughlin

Soak chronology
Grim Town (2019)	If I Never Know You Like This Again (2022)	Decembers (2026)

If I Never Know You Like This Again is the third studio album by Northern Irish singer-songwriter Soak. It was released on 20 May 2022 on Rough Trade Records.

== Critical reception ==
Professional ratings
Aggregate scores
Source	Rating
Metacritic	79/100
Review scores
Source	Rating
AllMusic	3.5/5 stars
DIY	4/5 stars
Hot Press	9/10
The Irish Times	5/5 stars
The Line of Best Fit	8/10
Loud and Quiet	7/10
Paste	7.4/10
PopMatters	8/10
Record Collector	3/5 stars
The Sunday Times	4/5 stars

If I Never Know You Like This Again received generally favourable reviews from contemporary music critics. At Metacritic, which assigns a normalised rating out of 100 to reviews from mainstream critics, the album received an average score of 79, based on 5 reviews.

Rolling Stone called the album "a personal, vivid and essential listen".

== Track listing ==
If I Never Know You Like This Again track listing
No.	Title	Length
1.	"Purgatory"	4:08
2.	"Last July"	3:46
3.	"Bleach"	4:08
4.	"Get Well Soon"	3:56
5.	"Red Eye"	4:26
6.	"Guts"	4:06
7.	"Baby, You're Full of Shit"	4:26
8.	"Pretzel"	3:28
9.	"Neptune"	6:53
10.	"Swear Jar"	4:36
Total length:		43:53

== Charts ==
Chart performance for If I Never Know You Like This Again
Chart (2022)	Peak position
Scottish Albums (Official Charts)	73
UK Independent Albums (Official Charts)	25
