= A Rapist in Your Path =

Chilean feminist protest performance

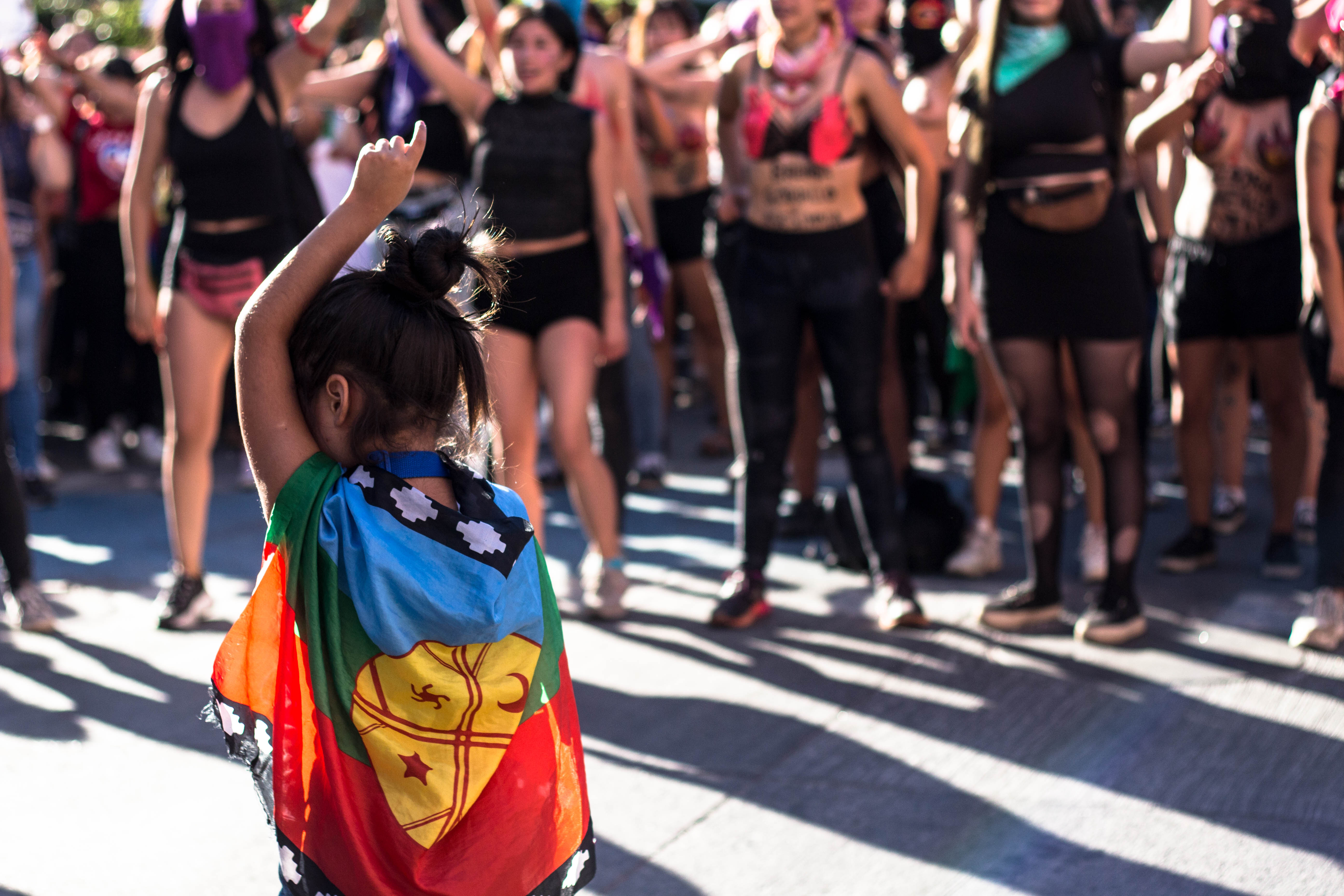
Performance in Concepción, Chile at the 2020 International Women's Day. The girl has a Mapuche flag.

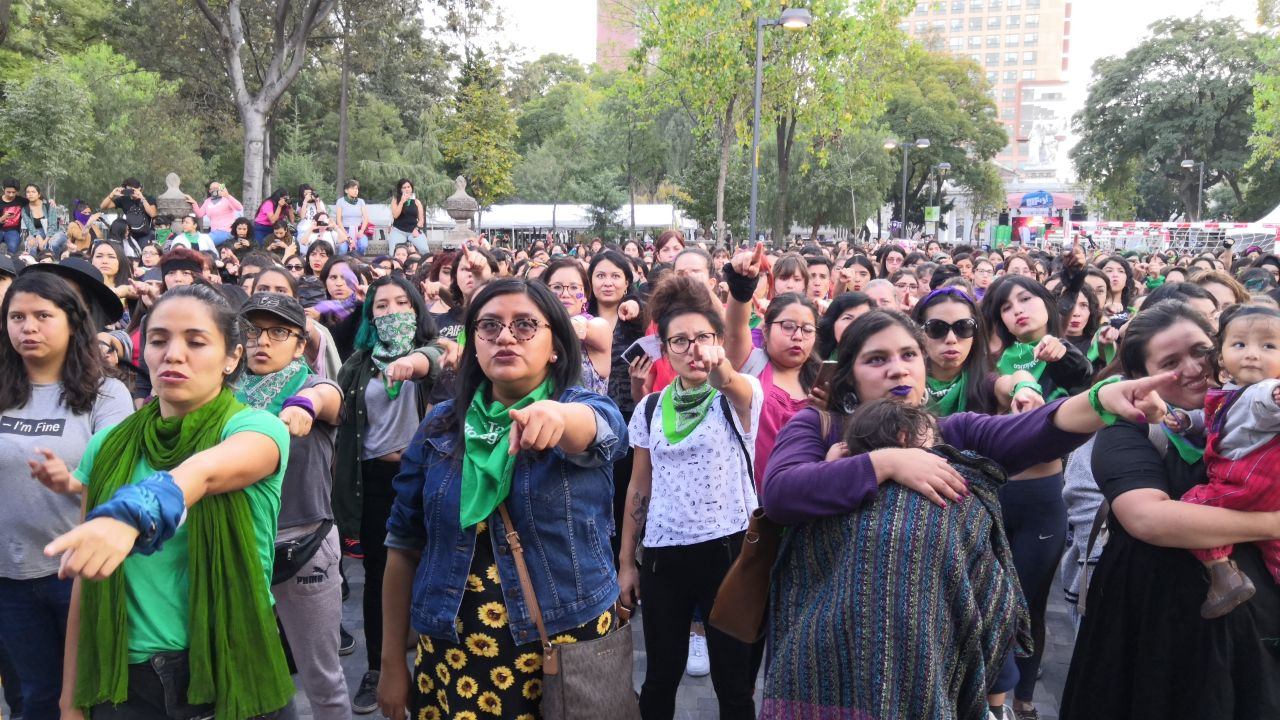
Women performing "A Rapist in Your Path" in Alameda Central, Mexico

"A Rapist in Your Path" (Spanish: Un violador en tu camino), also known as "The Rapist Is You" (Spanish: El violador eres tú), is a Chilean feminist performance piece that originated in 2019 to protest violence against women. The performance has garnered international attention and has been staged in various locations including Latin America, the United States, and Europe. Developed by the Valparaíso feminist collective LasTesis, the piece draws inspiration from the work of Rita Segato.

== Lyrics and choreography ==
The performance takes its name from the slogan Un amigo en tu camino ("A Friend Along Your Path"), which was used by Carabineros de Chile in the 1990s. The lyrics of the original Chilean version of "Un violador en tu camino" include a verse from the Chilean police anthem, Orden y Patria ("Order and Homeland"), which addresses a young girl and suggests that her Carabinero lover is watching over her. These references critique the Chilean police, highlighting allegations of sexual violence against female demonstrators.

In the English version of the song, adapted for performances in the United States and other English-speaking regions, this verse of the police anthem is omitted. Additionally, the choreography includes a squatting motion that references a practice employed by the police against female detainees, where they are forced to strip naked and assume a squatting position. Participants often dress in "party" clothes to protest victim-blaming practices that unfairly shift blame onto victims of sexual assault by focusing on their clothing choices.

The lyrics "y la culpa no era mía, ni dónde estaba, ni cómo vestía" ("and it was not my fault, nor where I was, nor how I dressed") convey the message that women have the right to dress however they choose and occupy public and private spaces without becoming victims of sexual assault or being held responsible for the actions of the perpetrator. Moreover, the use of blindfolds in the performance references both the victims of eye injuries during the 2019-2020 Chilean protests and La Venda Sexy, a torture center from the Pinochet era where female political prisoners were blindfolded and subjected to sexual violence and other forms of torture.

== Performance history ==
=== Origins in Chile ===
Although initially planned for October 2019, the debut of the piece was delayed due to nationwide protests. Finally, on 20 November, "Un violador en tu camino" was performed for the first time in public at Aníbal Pinto Square in downtown Valparaíso. On 25 November, in commemoration of the International Day for the Elimination of Violence against Women, various groups of women performed "Un violador en tu camino" in multiple locations in Santiago, the capital of Chile. Following widespread participation in Chile, the creators called for women in other countries to perform their own renditions of the piece. In Temuco, a city in southern Chile, indigenous Mapuche women performed a translated version of "Un violador en tu camino" in Mapudungun.

While the dance was originally conceived as a critique of rape culture and state violence in general, it resonated even more deeply with Chilean women following incidents of sexual violence against protesters during the October 2019 demonstrations. In response to these events, the creators decided to adapt the piece specifically to address the actions of the police. The Instituto Nacional de Derechos Humanos (National Human Rights Institute) reported that between 17 October 2019 and 13 March 2020, they had initiated legal action on behalf of 282 victims of torture with sexual violence perpetrated by the police and other government agents during the protests. Reports indicate that sexual violence was also used as a form of torture during the military dictatorship in Chile from 1973 to 1990.

Although not originally conceived as a protest piece, widespread performances by demonstrators contributed to its international recognition.

=== Outside of Chile ===
Videos of the performance quickly went viral, rapidly spreading across the world. Similar performances soon emerged in various countries such as Argentina, Mexico, Colombia, France, Spain, and the United Kingdom. On 29 November 2019, thousands of women performed the piece at the Zócalo, Mexico City's main square. On December 8, 2019, in Istanbul, Turkey, police intervened and detained several of the protestors. Authorities stated that the gathering was unauthorized. A few days later, female Turkish members of Parliament performed the song inside the Turkish parliament. Republican People's Party MP, Saliha Sera Kadıgil Sütlü, directly addressed Minister of the Interior Süleyman Soylu, emphatically declaring that "Thanks to you, Turkey is the only country in which you must have (parliamentary) immunity to participate in this protest."

The impact of "Un violador en tu camino" resonated deeply in the United States, particularly in the aftermath of the MeToo Movement, serving as an anthem for ongoing activism against sexual abuse. In January 2020, during the high-profile trial of Harvey Weinstein in New York City, demonstrators performed the piece in response to allegations of sexual misconduct involving powerful figures like Weinstein and Donald Trump. In Miami, some performers referenced Brett Kavanaugh in relation to allegations of sexual misconduct. Meanwhile, in Bogotá, Colombia, journalists devised their own adaptation of the song, altering the lyrics to confront sexism within the press industry and prominently displaying signs in honor of femicide victims.

According to GeoChicas, an organization that tracks documented performances, "Un violador en tu camino" has been performed in more than 400 locations across over 50 countries as of 2021.
