= Grim Town =

Studio album by Soak
- Released: 26 April 2019
- Genres: Indie pop; indie folk; art pop
- Length: 53:49
- Label: Rough Trade

Soak chronology
Before We Forgot How to Dream (2015)	Grim Town (2019)	If I Never Know You Like This Again (2022)

Singles from Grim Town
- 1. "Everybody Loves You" Released: 3 October 2018; 2. "Knock Me Off My Feet" Released: 10 January 2019; 3. "Valentine Shmalentine" Released: 7 February 2019; 4. "Déjà Vu" Released: 8 March 2019

Professional ratings
Aggregate scores
Source	Rating
Metacritic	79/100
Review scores
Source	Rating
AllMusic	4/5 stars
Clash	7/10
DIY	3.5/5 stars
Exclaim!	7/10
Paste	7.4/10
Pitchfork	7.3/10

Grim Town is the second studio album by Northern Irish singer-songwriter Soak. It was released on 26 April 2019 under Rough Trade Records.

== Critical reception ==
Grim Town received generally favourable reviews from contemporary music critics. At Metacritic, which assigns a normalised rating out of 100 to reviews from mainstream critics, the album received an average score of 79, based on 12 reviews.

== Track listing ==
Grim Town track listing
No.	Title	Length
1.	"All Aboard"	1:29
2.	"Get Set Go Kid"	4:19
3.	"Everybody Loves You"	3:20
4.	"Knock Me Off My Feet"	3:08
5.	"Maybe"	4:31
6.	"Fall Asleep/Backseat"	3:27
7.	"Crying Your Eyes Out"	4:01
8.	"I Was Blue, Technicolour Too"	3:59
9.	"Déjà Vu"	3:12
10.	"Scrapyard"	2:46
11.	"Valentine Shmalentine"	4:01
12.	"YBFTBYT"	2:35
13.	"Life Trainee"	3:54
14.	"Missed Calls"	5:01
15.	"Nothing Looks the Same"	4:06

== Popular culture ==
"Knock Me Off My Feet" was used in the Amazon Original Series Invincible Episode 6 "You Look Kinda Dead", In which Mark and Amber take a tour of Upstate University and have an impromptu date.

== Charts ==
Chart performance for Grim Town
Chart (2019)	Peak position
Irish Albums (IRMA)	66
Scottish Albums (Official Charts)	64
UK Independent Albums (Official Charts)	20
