= Aníbal Pinto Square =

Square in Valparaíso, Chile

Coordinates: 33°2′35.35″S 71°37′28.68″W

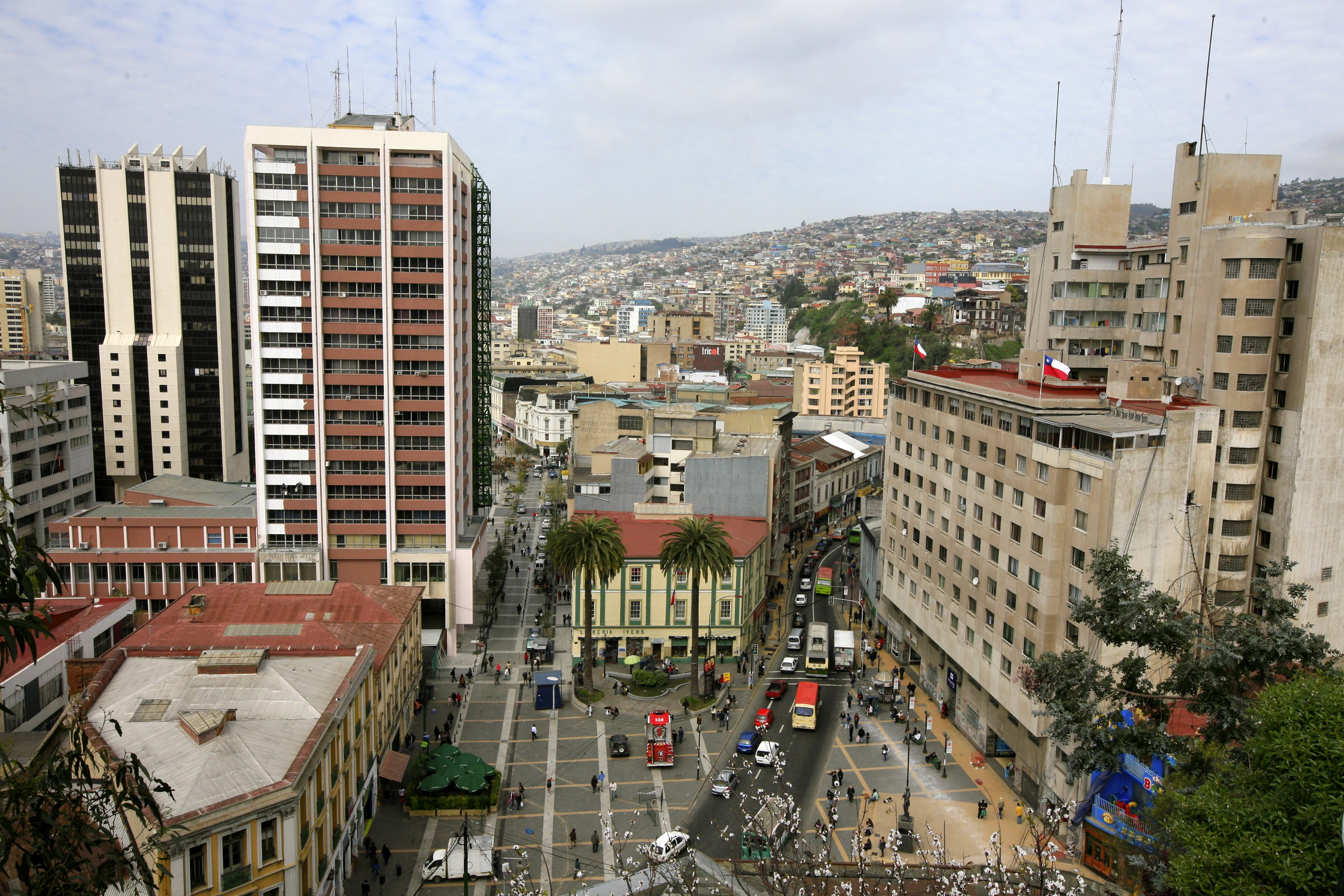
Aníbal Pinto Square as seen from Concepción hill

The Aníbal Pinto Square (Spanish: Plaza Aníbal Pinto) is a town square built on reclaimed land in Valparaíso, Chile. Formerly "Plaza del Orden" (Order Square), the Aníbal Pinto Square is named after President Aníbal Pinto. It features a fountain called "Fuente de Neptuno" (Fountain of Neptune), which was erected in 1892.
