= Northern Ireland Music Prize =

- Awarded for: Recognising the great wealth of recorded music from Northern Ireland
- Sponsored by: Oh Yeah
- Location: Belfast
- Country: Northern Ireland
- First award: 2013
- Website: nimusicprize.com

The Northern Ireland Music Prize awards is an annual award for an album released by a Northern Irish music act. It is produced by the Oh Yeah Music Centre, and is supported by Arts Council of Northern Ireland and Phonographic Performance Limited. Started in 2013, it was "aimed at recognising the great wealth of recorded music from Northern Ireland." In 2020, in light of the COVID-19 pandemic, the ceremony was broadcast online.

A shortlist of 14 albums is created each year by an academy of professionals from the Northern Irish music industry. The prize winner would be selected by a "panel of experts" and announced at a ceremony in Belfast’s Mandela Hall.

Four other awards are presented at the ceremony, as well as the NI Music Prize: Best Live Act, Best Single, The Oh Yeah Contender Award (Emerging Act) and the Legend Award. These awards were introduced at the 2018 ceremony.

== Winners ==
- 2013 — Foy Vance (Joy of Nothing)
- 2014 — Robyn G Shiels (The Blood of Innocents)
- 2015 — Soak (Before We Forgot How to Dream)
- 2016 — Ciaran Lavery (Let Bad In)
- 2017 — Joshua Burnside (Ephrata)
- 2018 — The Wood Burning Savages (Stability)
- 2019 — Ryan Vail & Elma Orchestra (Borders)
- 2020 — Kitt Philippa (Human)
- 2021 — Saint Sister (Where I Should End)
- 2022 — Robocobra Quartet (Living Isn't Easy)
- 2023 — Arborist (An Endless Sequence of Dead Zeroes)
- 2024 — Problem Patterns (Blouse Club)
- 2025 — Róis (MO LÉAN)
- 2026 — Joshua Burnside (It's Not Going to be Okay)
