= Florence MacAulay =

British suffragist and songwriter

Florence Elizabeth Mary MacAulay

Personal details
- Born: 1862
- Died: 1945 (aged 82–83)
- Education: Somerville College, Oxford
- Known for: The Women's Marseillaise

Florence Elizabeth Mary MacAulay (1862–1945) was a British suffragist and part of the Women's Social and Political Union (WSPU). In 1909, she wrote the lyrics to The Women's Marseillaise, which was a popular marching song for the WSPU.

== Early life ==
MacAuley was born in Reading, England. Her father worked as a bookseller. MacAuley received higher education in Somerville College (at the time Somerville Hall) at the University of Oxford. She dropped out of Oxford after two terms, owing to the death of her father. She returned to Oxford in 1886 but did not complete her degree. MacAuley worked as a teacher for 20 years, including six years at Great Yarmouth High School. She never married.

== Suffragist movement ==
MacAuley joined the WSPU by 1907, engaging herself as an organiser and planning activities in multiple locations across England. This entailed living a nomadic lifestyle for a few years. She was the WSPU organiser for Canterbury and South Kent from 1910-1912. During this time she lived in "Trevarra", a boarding house used by WSPU organisers and escaped "mice". In 1913 MacAuley was arrested alongside Annie Kenney in London.
