= Arbeter Froyen =

1918 Yiddish socialist song

Arbeter Froyen (Yiddish: אַרבעטער פֿרױען, lit. 'Working Women') is a Yiddish song by Jacob Glatstein, based on a 1891 poem by David Edelstadt, entitled Tsu Di Arbeter Froyen (Yiddish: צו די אַרבעטער פֿרױען, lit. 'To the Working Women'). The song combines themes of socialist feminism with the ideals of the International Jewish Labor Bund.

The poem was published on May 8, 1891, in American Yiddish-language newspaper Fraye Arbeter Shtime. The song was published in Warsaw in 1918. However, the song had been sung before its first written attribution, as shown by contemporaries to events in the late Russian Empire, such as Anatole Litvak, Shalom Levin, and Abba Levin; who noted that the song was popular in the 1890s amongst strikers.

== Recordings ==
- "Yiddish Songs Of Work And Struggle", Yiddish Youth Ensemble (ft. Betty Glaser, Dina Schwartzman, Josh Waletsky, Judy Gottlieb, Khane Kliger, Moishe Mlotek, Moishe Rosenfeld, Susan Finesilver, Zalmen Mlotek), 1972
- "In Love And In Struggle: The Musical Legacy Of The Jewish Labor Bund", featuring Zalmen Mlotek, Adrienne Cooper, Dan Rous with The New Yiddish Chorale and The Workmen's Circle Chorus, 1999
- "The Butcher's Share", Daniel Kahn & the Painted Bird ft. Sarah Gordon, Lorin Sklamberg, Sasha Lurje, Sveta Kundish, and Patrick Farrell, 2017 [sung in English and Yiddish]
- "Millennial Bundist", Isabel Frey, 2020

== Lyrics ==
=== Original text ===
Yiddish

!אַרבעטער־פֿרױען, לײַדנדע פֿרױען
פֿרױען ,װאָס שמאַכטן אין הױז און פֿאַבריק
װאָס שטײט איר פֿון װײַטן ,װאָס העלפֿט איר ניט בױען
?דעם טעמפּל פֿון פֿרײַהײט ,פֿון מענטשלעכן גליק

העלפֿט אונדז טראָגן דעם באַנער דעם רױטן
פֿאָרװערטס ,דורך שטורעם ,דורך פֿינצטערע נעכט
העלפֿט אונדז װאַרהײט און ליכט צו פֿאַרשפּרײטן
!צװישן אומװיסנדע ,עלנטע קנעכט

!העלפֿט אונדז די װעלט פֿון איר שמוץ דערהײבן

אַלעס אָפּפֿערן ,װאָס אונדז איז ליב

קעמפֿן צוזאַמען ,װי מעכטיקע לײבן
פֿאַר פֿרײַהײט, פֿאַר גלײַכהײט, פֿאַר אונדזער פּרינציפּ

ניט אײן מאָל האָבן שױן נאָבעלע פֿרױען
געמאַכט ציטערן הענקער און טראָן
זײ האָבן געצײַגט, אַז מען קען זײ פֿאַרטרױען
אין ביטערסטן שטורעם די הײליקע פֿאָן

Romanization

Arbeter-froyen, laydnde froyen!
Froyen, vos shmakhtn in hoyz un fabrik,
Vos shteyt ir fun vaytn, vos helft ir nit boyen
Dem templ fun frayhayt, fun mentshlekhn glik?

Helft undz trogn dem baner dem roytn,
Forverts, durkh shturem, durkh fintstere nekht!
Helft undz varhayt un likht tsu farshpreytn,
Tsvishn unvisnde, eltne knekht!

Helft undz di velt fun ir shmuts derheybn!
Ales opfern, vos undz iz lib;
Kemfn tsuzamen, vi mekhtike leybn
Far frayhayt, far glaykhhayt, far undzer printsip!

Nit eyn mol hobn shoyn nobele froyen,
Gemakht tsitern henker un tron,
Zey hobn getsaygt, az men ken zey fartroyen,
In biterstn shturem di heylike fon.

Literal translation

Working women, suffering women.
Women who languish at home and in the factory.
Why are you standing on the sidelines?
Why aren't you helping build the temple of freedom, of human happiness?

Help us carry the red banner
forward, through the storm, through dark nights!
Help us spread truth and light
among ignorant, lonely slaves!

Help us raise the world from its squalor
And achieve everything we value.
to fight together, like mighty lions –
for freedom, equality, our ideals!

More than once have brave women
made tyrants and thrones tremble.
They have shown that they can be trusted,
through the bitterest storms, with the holy flag.

=== English versions ===
Daniel Kahn & Adrienne Cooper's version	Unknown version 1	Unknown version 2
Arbeter froyen, hard-working women	You women who work, you women who suffer	Working Women, women who suffer
Women who labor in fact'ries & homes	All the day long from your breakfast to supper	Who languish at home or in shop's abyss
Join in the fight, for it's only beginning	Why don't you join in and help in constructing	Don't stand at a distance - Why not help build
And no one should stand in the struggle alone	A temple of freedom where you'll be instructing	The temple of freedom, of human bliss?
Let us all carry the red flag together	Your comrades to carry the banner of scarlet	Not once have noble women put fear
Weathering storms in the dark of the night	To say, “We are free and nobody’s harlot”?	On a throne, on a hangman, a money bag
Building a temple of freedom forever	Help us in spreading the truth to the masses;	They showed us that in the bitter storm
Helping each other to carry the light	Teach them they're human and not stupid asses	You can trust them to bear our holy flag
So many sisters, daughters & mothers	Help us to teach them to rise from their squalor	Women heroes, they've stood in the storm
Have given their lives for the things they believe	And set an example of courage and valor.	In darkness they've promised hope and light!
Mighty as lions they fight for each other	Let's join in the fight that says all are equal	They've meted out vengeance on murderous tyrants
For freedom & justice & equality	For thus will true freedom be the great sequel.	Looked in death's face, proud and upright.
We'll carry the banner as sisters & brothers	’Twill not be the first time that women of courage	Remember them? When you do, live their lives
Waking the world to the light of the day	Did challenge the mighty who held all the power	Inspire you again! In triumph you'll pass!
As friends & companions, as comrades & lovers	These were the women whom none could discourage	Learn and think! Fight and strive
Arbeter froyen, show us the way	They stood up and said, “Now this is our hour!”	For freedom and joy for the whole working class!
