= A Scary Time =

2018 feminist protest song

Screenshot from the October 7 video

"A Scary Time" is a 2018 feminist protest song and viral video written and performed by Lynzy Lab. It is based on the comment by former United States president Donald Trump that "it's a very scary time for young men in America", which he said amid the sexual assault allegations against his Supreme Court nominee Brett Kavanaugh. The song contains a list of situations in which men have harassed, coerced, or sexually assaulted women in the U.S. The list also includes some of the past responses from the American public, media, and legal system to women who have accused men of such acts.

== Background ==
In response to allegations that his nominee for the Supreme Court of the United States, Brett Kavanaugh, had sexually assaulted Christine Blasey Ford, Deborah Ramirez and another woman; President Donald Trump said: "I say that it's a very scary time for young men in America, when you can be guilty of something that you may not be guilty of."

Lynzy Lab, a Texan dancer, choreographer, singer-songwriter, dance instructor at the Texas State University, and a former principal dancer at the Houston Metropolitan Dance Company; was inspired by Trump's comment to write a satirical song:

I was angry to hear the president describe these times as 'scary for men' with a complete disregard of the struggles we, as women, face on a daily basis.

— Lab's comments to ABC News

A victim of sexual assault herself, Lab also heard many stories about sexual assault from women to whom she has taught dance. She said that she hoped that the song "would lift a little bit of the weight".

== Song ==
The two-and-a-half-minute song's lyrics satirize men who are anxious because of the Me Too movement, pointing out all of the things that women are told not to do in order to avoid being sexually assaulted. In the refrain, Lab exposes what she sees as false equivalences between male violence against women and supposed male victimization by sexual assault allegations: "But it sure is a scary time for boys!" Lab does not mention Trump or Kavanaugh in the video, but references the 35-year interval between Ford's and Ramirez's alleged assault and their accusations ("I can't speak out against my rapist after 35 years").

Lab momentarily pauses near the end of the song, realizing "it's not such scary time for boys / they've always had the upper hand, they've always had a choice". Lab says that it is time for women to "rise up" and "use our collective voice", and urges the listener to "make some noise" by voting in the 2018 United States elections on November 6.

In her original video, Lab performed solo, singing and playing a ukulele; in her appearance on Jimmy Kimmel Live! she was accompanied by a chorus of more than a dozen women.

== Release and reception ==
Lab posted the video on YouTube Saturday, October 6, the same day that Kavanaugh was confirmed and sworn in as Supreme Court justice. The song became a viral hit, with over 11.4 million views on Twitter in the first five days and more than 28 million on Facebook in the first two days. The video received a warm response on social media and was endorsed by celebrities, including Mark Ruffalo, Ellen DeGeneres, Matthew Modine, Patricia Arquette and Alyssa Milano. Lab said that she "did not expect such an overwhelming response" and described the attention that her song received as "surreal and very exciting". She told ABC that strangers were sharing their stories with her, which she said "[is] truly the most rewarding feeling". Lab performed the song on Jimmy Kimmel Live! on the International Day of the Girl, which encourages female leadership. The host Jimmy Kimmel said that the Me Too movement and the events surrounding Kavanaugh's confirmation as Supreme Court justice had illuminated the risks and fear that women face as part of their everyday life.

According to Australian columnist Van Badham writing for The Guardian, Lab's song "exposes Donald Trump's rightwing mythology of confected male victimhood". Identifying A Scary Time as part of a "[tradition] of confrontation between cultural resisters and the state", Badham compares Lab to prominent protest song artists, such as Phil Ochs. In Vanity Fair, Laura Bradley described the song as "brutally sarcastic". Writing for The Washington Post, Timothy Bella stated that Lab had "morphed into the newest feminist voice of the Democratic resistance". Dan Solomon of Texas Monthly compared the song's focus to the Him Too movement, which casts doubt on all sexual assault allegations based on an alleged conspiracy against men.

Lab received criticism from the video allegedly attempting to mock men. She responded in a tweet she posted on October 10: "Just to clear up any confusion: I'm not here to delegitimize men's struggles. I'm just hoping that we can finally start legitimizing women's. Regardless of what you've decided about me, I'm not 'anti-men'. I am, however, super 'pro-women'. You should be too."
