= Emmy Meli =

American singer (born 1999)

Emily "Emmy Meli" Lomeli (born December 14, 1999) is an American-born R&B pop singer known for her hit song "I Am Woman". The song has earned over 300 million streams. The song went viral after she posted a small clip of it, and she quickly had to write and record then release the full song. "I Am Woman" is the theme song for Meghan Markle's podcast Archetypes. Meli's music has been featured in ad campaigns for Intimissimi, Triumph UK, Savage X Fenty, dm-drogerie markt, Brutal Fruit (spritzer), and Disney+.

Meli has played at Lollapalooza and Firefly Festival, and opened for JoJo (singer) on the Too Much To Say Tour as well as Hayley Kiyoko.

Meli's debut EP, Hello Stranger, was released on May 10, 2024.
