= The Women's Marseillaise =

Anthem

"The Women's Marseillaise" was the former Women's Social and Political Union (WSPU) official anthem. It was sung to the tune of La Marseillaise and included words about women's suffrage written by Florence MacAulay. The song was sung by suffragists in both the United Kingdom and the United States.

== About ==
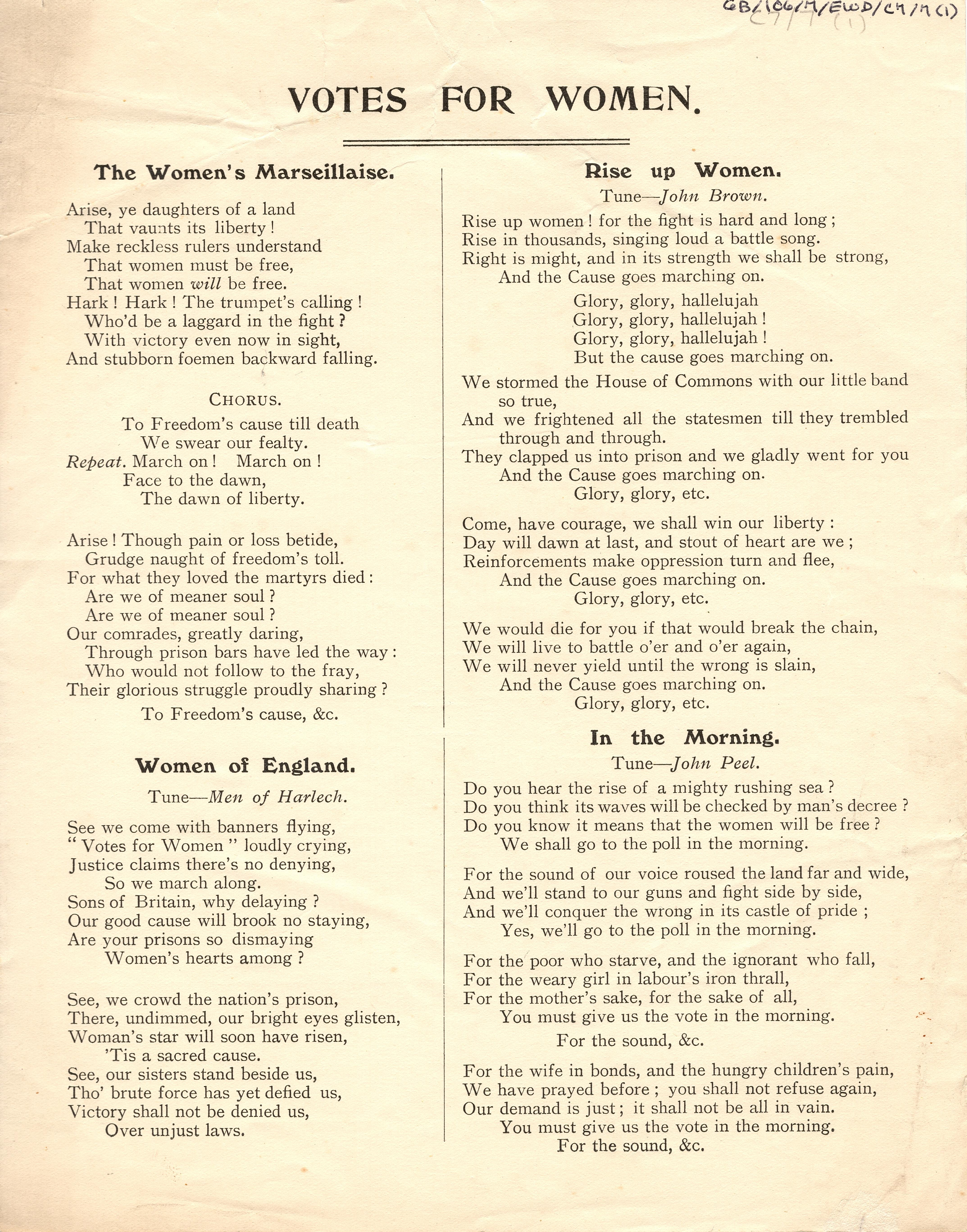
Votes for Women Songs including lyrics for "The Women's Marseillaise." "Rise Up Women," "Women of England" and "In the Morning."

"The Women's Marseillasie" was a former official anthem of the Women's Social and Political Union (WSPU). The song included words written by Florence MacAulay and was sung using the tune of La Marseillaise. Macauley lead the WSPU office in Edinburgh from 1909 to 1913.

The song was sung in many different settings, but most often as a form of protest or solidarity for women's rights in both the United Kingdom and the United States. The song was sung in order to lift the spirits of prisoners in Holloway Prison in 1908. Between 1908 and 1911, the Mascottes Ladies Band often performed "The Women's Marsellaise." In 1913, "The Women's Marsellaise" was sung by a protester in Britain during the trial of two suffragettes. In 1911, it was performed at a suffrage rally in Idaho. Suffragists in North Dakota also sang "The Women's Marsellaise" at an event in 1917.

== See also ==
- Art in the women's suffrage movement in the United States
