= Jack Coulter =

Irish artist (born 1994)

- Coulter in 2025
- Born: Jack Coulter; 20 April 1994 (age 32); Belfast, Northern Ireland
- Occupation: Artist
- Known for: Abstract painting
- Website: jackcoulter.com

Jack Coulter (born 1994) is an Irish artist. He is widely known for his paintings and the visceral quality in his work. In 2020, the Financial Times described Coulter as one of the most popular abstract painters emerging today. In 2021, Forbes featured Coulter in their 30 Under 30 list.

== Early life and education ==
Coulter grew up surrounded by abstract art, from an early age he became influenced by post-war Abstract Expressionism and his aunt Christine, who was an abstract printmaker. While still in art school, limited edition prints of his painting "Halesia" were given to the winners of the GQ Men of The Year Awards. He graduated with a Bachelor of Fine Arts degree in 2015.

Coulter has synesthesia, a neurological condition which has had a profound effect on his work, other well known synesthete artists include David Hockney, Vincent van Gogh and Joan Mitchell. In an interview with The Independent, Coulter's earliest memories of this date back to childhood, where he recalled the sound of his own heartbeat resonating pulses of colour. Throughout his teenage years, he would frequently paint while listening to jazz musicians such as Miles Davis and Dizzy Gillespie, translating the colours of the sounds onto canvas, with the aural timbres of the music inspiring the pace and motion of his paint strokes.

At 21 years of age, his painting titled "21" was purchased for the Arts Council Collection of Northern Ireland, the UK's most widely seen collection of modern and contemporary art, making him the collection's youngest artist.

== Career ==
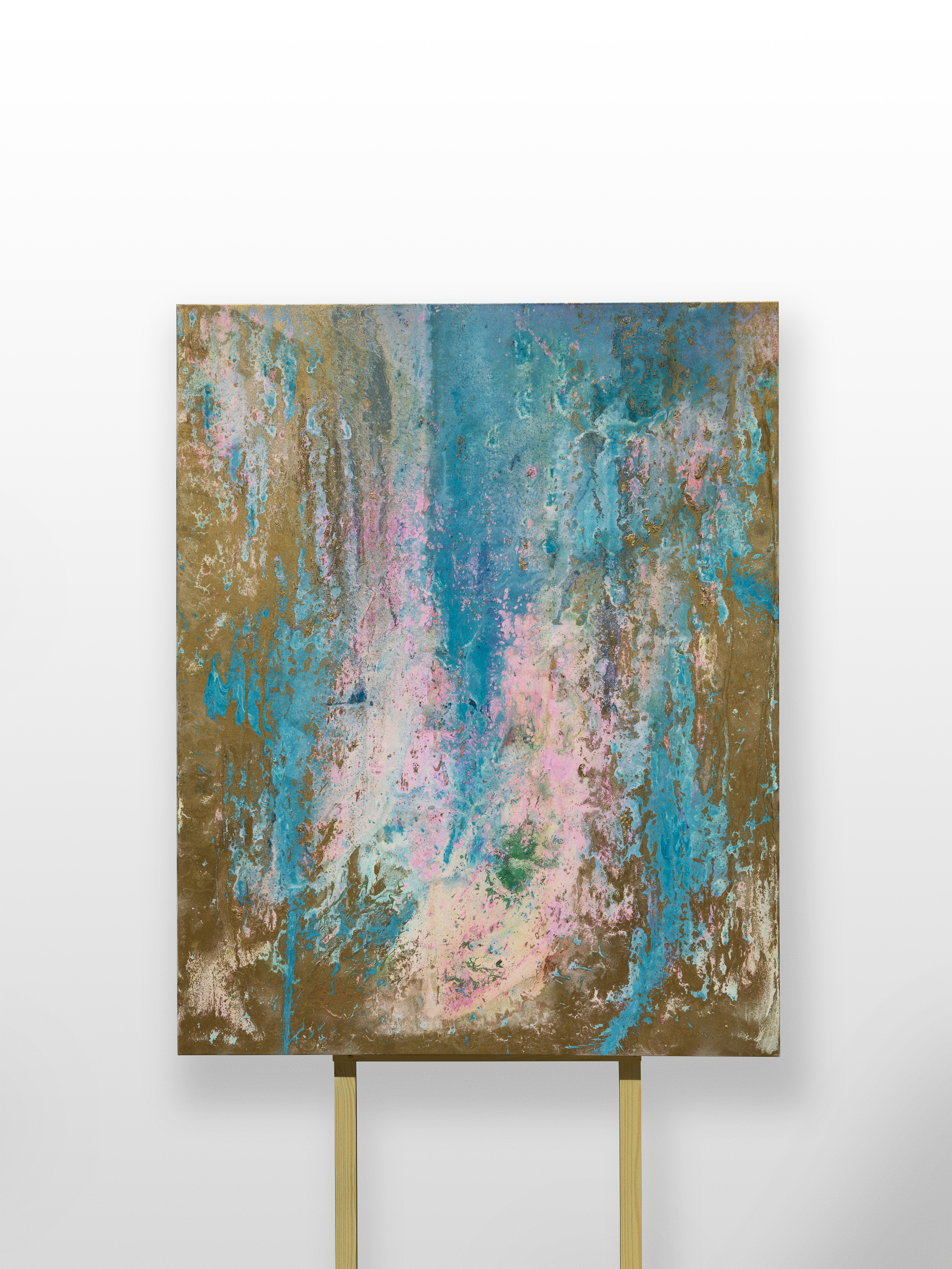
Coulter's painting of "Mr. Bad Guy", commissioned by Freddie Mercury's estate.

In June 2016, Coulter collaborated with worldwide music streaming service Deezer, where he produced a 'musical painting' for Glastonbury Festival. His painting attracted worldwide attention and acclaim, it was featured in The Independent, The Guardian, The Irish Times and AOL.

In April 2018, Coulter painted Mendelssohn's Violin Concerto live with London Chamber Orchestrain front of a full audience at Cadogan Hall in London, it was also streamed worldwide. He had a solo article in British Vogue covering the performance.

In 2018, he was commissioned by The Freddie Mercury Estate, depicting one of the iconic Freddie Mercury tracks "Mr. Bad Guy" on canvas. The piece was then exhibited in Bohemian Rhapsody: The Queen Exhibition in Seoul.

In 2020, Coulter collaborated with Brit Award-winning musician Jack Garratt, providing album artwork for Garratt's sophomore album Love, Death & Dancing under Island Records.

One of his paintings titled 'Rosegold' was auctioned by The Art of Elysium in Los Angeles through Paddle8 in 2018. He was the youngest artist included and the piece was purchased by Shanola Hampton.

Coulter has also collaborated with Chanel, Alexander McQueen, Burberry, Christian Dior, Calvin Klein, Marc Jacobs and Byredo for Dazed, being asked to transcribe each brand's scent on canvas.

Coulter's work is owned by many notable individuals and companies such as Anne Hathaway, Elton John, Coca-Cola, Billie Eilish, Post Malone, Antoni Porowski, Hilary Weston, Paul McCartney and Patti Smith.
