= Problem Patterns =

Belfast feminist punk band

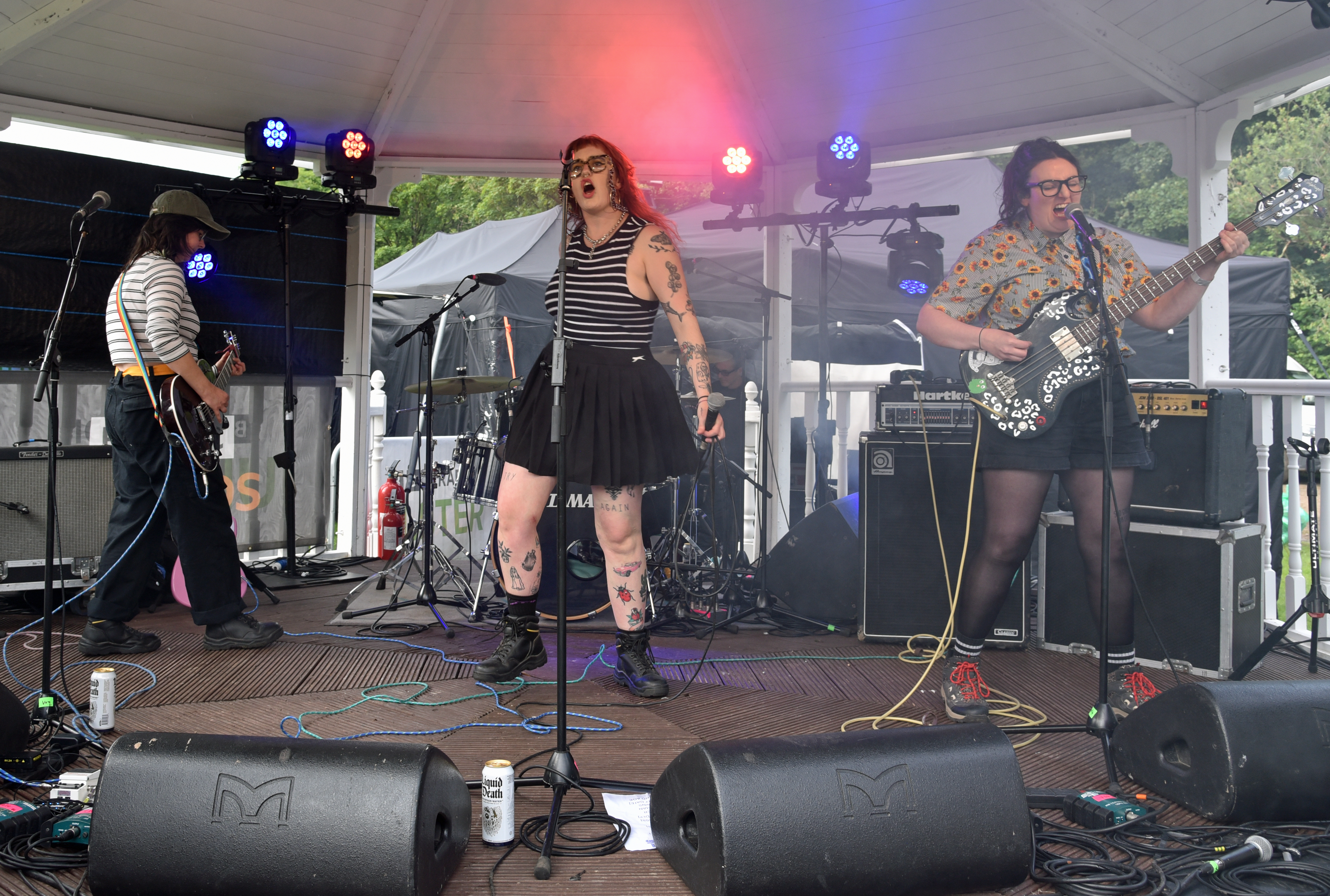
- Problem Patterns at Stendhal Festival in 2024

Background information
- Origin: Belfast, Northern Ireland
- Genres: Punk rock; Riot grrrl; Queercore
- Years active: 2018–present
- Label: Alcopop! Records
- Members: Beverley Boal; Bethany Crooks; Alanah Smith; Ciara King
- Website: problempatterns.bandcamp.com

Problem Patterns are a Northern Irish punk rock band formed in Belfast in 2018 by Beverley Boal, Bethany Crooks, Alanah Smith, and Ciara King. They all share vocals, rather than having a designated frontperson, and switch instruments when performing live. The band is outspokenly feminist. Their lyrics cover topics such as femicide, homophobia, the state of the healthcare system, and sexism in the music industry.

They released their debut album Blouse Club in 2023 on independent label Alcopop! Records. It was the final mastering project of Peter J. Moore. It won Album of the Year at the 2024 Northern Ireland Music Prize. They have performed at Glastonbury Festival, Stendhal Festival, 2000trees and Truck Festival.

== Discography ==
=== Albums ===
- Blouse Club - Alcopop! (2023)

=== EPs ===
- Good For You, Aren't You Great? - Self released (2019)
- Boring Songs For Boring People - Alcopop! (2025)
