= Oh Yeah (music centre) =

Music centre located in Belfast, Northern Ireland

Oh Yeah is a music centre located in Belfast, Northern Ireland, in the Cathedral Quarter. It was founded primarily to support young talented musicians and bands from Northern Ireland and its huge and growing music scene by providing help and promotion, technical equipment for rehearsing, recording, gigs and event organisation, performing space and releases of band compilations (Oh Yeah Sessions, Scratch My Progress). The Oh Yeah Music Centre's genres are varying in its manifolds of Alternative rock, Indie rock, Electronica, Post rock, Post punk, Crossover, Experimental rock and further musical stylistic ways and conceptions.

== Formation ==
The Oh Yeah project was formed after a meeting between Gary Lightbody, of Snow Patrol, the former Assistant Editor of NME Stuart Bailie, who has been presenting radio programmes for the BBC since 1999, Martin Neill, a multi-media professional and head of the web design business "No More Art" and Davy Matchett, who has been involved in business and banking for the past ten years and shares a passion for music, on 29 December 2005. The group agreed that the project would prove beneficial to the Belfast, and Northern Ireland, music scene. Additionally, the group decided that Oh Yeah would be a non-profit organization. After a number of fundraisers and charity work for the centre, Lightbody's band Snow Patrol donated a sizeable sum. Lightbody felt it would be more beneficial to get assistance from the government, and the group met Secretary of State Peter Hain on 11 January 2007 with their idea at Millbank, London. They succeeded in securing backing and financial assistance. Tim Wheeler from Ash and BBC Radio 1's Colin Murray are also counted amongst the active supporters of the Oh Yeah.

What the Patrol would have given for the advice of professionals; the space to rehearse or cut demos; a place to hang out and listen to music and meet people that might one day change your life. “What is needed is a nexus to focus musical energy into and to unite the Belfast music scene in a way that has been elusive until now. It is staggering how simple music is when you boil it down: people, together.

— Gary Lightbody, Snow Patrol

== Location ==
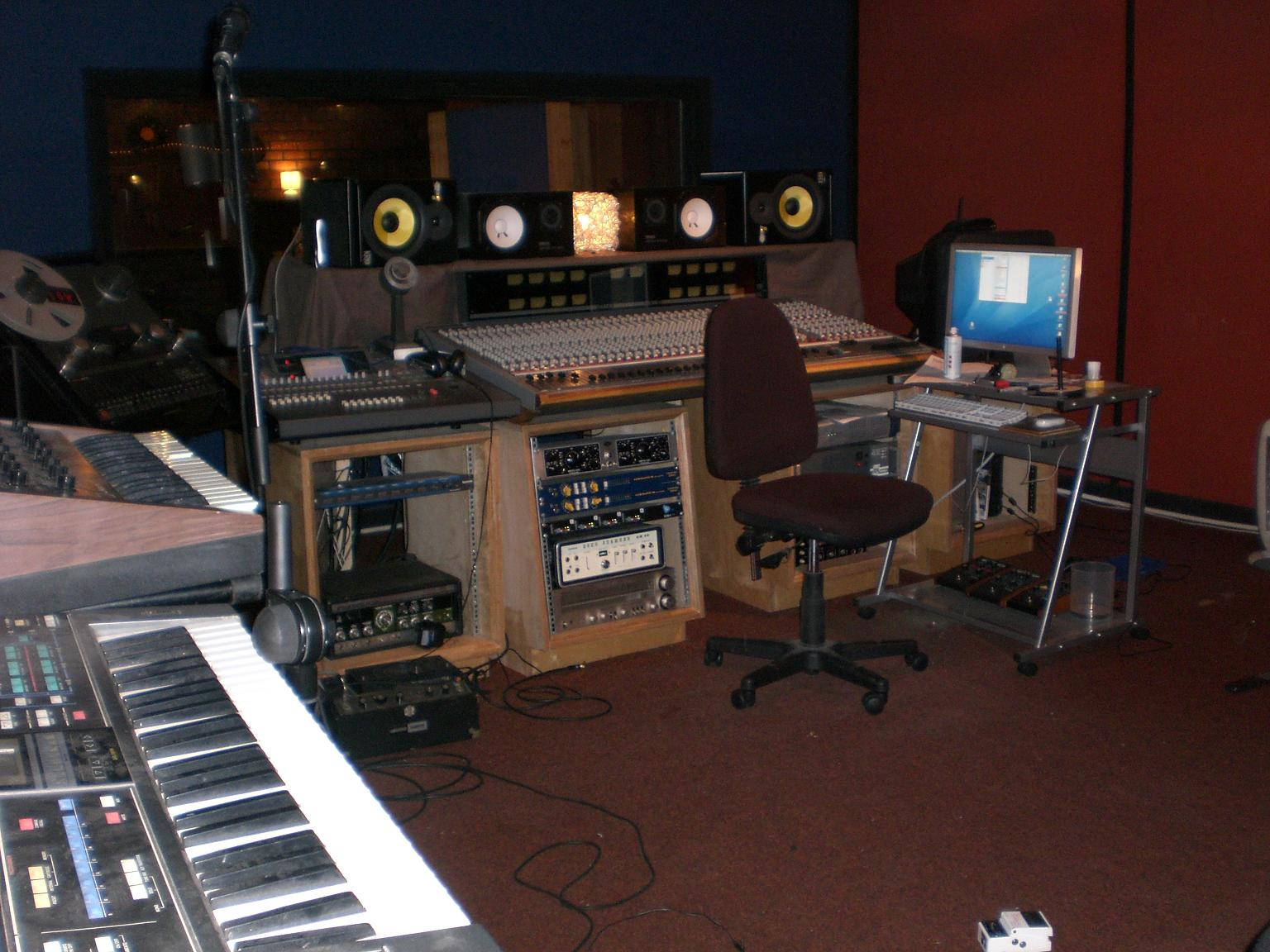
Recording studio

The venue is a former bonded whiskey warehouse in the heart of the Cathedral Quarter, Belfast’s cultural district. It measures 14,500 square feet (1,350 m^{2}) over three floors and is home to rehearsal rooms, performance space, a café and office units for music businesses. The venue was inaugurated on 5 May 2007 and featured performances by Snow Patrol, Starsailor, Duke Special and actor James Nesbitt.

== Recent activity ==
The 2008 Fate Awards supported the project, and part of the profits made from the event were donated for the project. Project manager Stuart Bailie said: "The guys at Fate are actively raising funds for Oh Yeah - to literally put a roof over our heads. Fate instantly recognized that trying to establish a dedicated music centre for Belfast is a very tough process. We hope to become good friends with Fate and their contribution will go a long way to Oh Yeah realizing its potential."

== Band Compilations ==
=== Oh Yeah Sessions 2008 ===
1. When Jackie Shone - Cashier No.9
2. Kansus – Kowalski
3. Where's Your Sense of Urgency? – Panama Kings
4. A Little Bit Of Solidarity Goes A Long Way – And So I Watch You From Afar
5. Golden Ticket – The Jane Bradfords
6. Of The Bear – Mojo Fury
7. Please Take Your Time – General Fiasco
8. Mr. Heskey – Lafaro

Bonus tracks:

9. Align the Planets - In Case of Fire
10. Rides Again - David Holmes
