= Protest song =

Song associated with a movement for social change

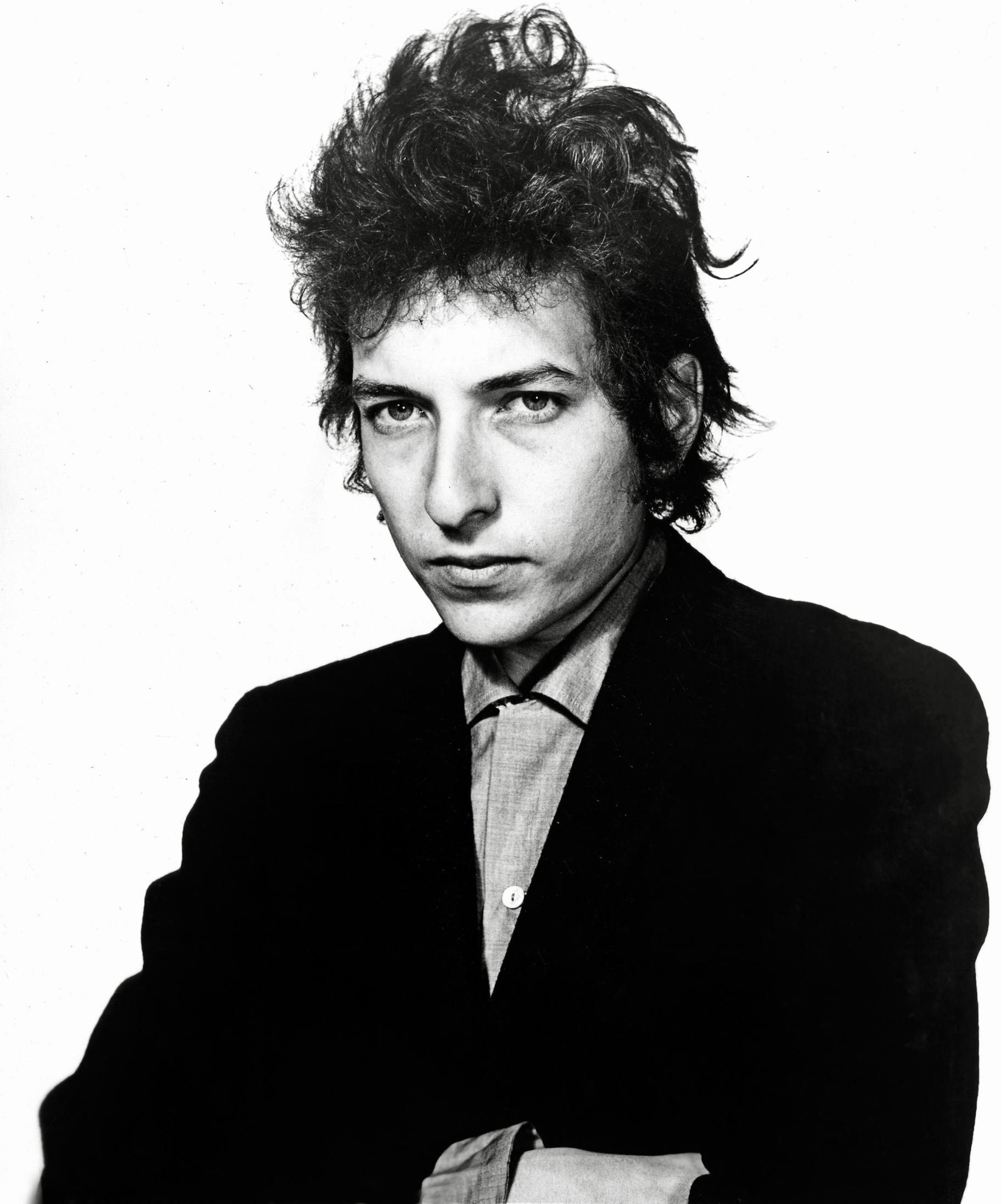
Bob Dylan songs such as "Blowin' in the Wind" and "The Times They Are a-Changin'" became anthems for the civil rights and anti-war movements in the 1960s.

A protest song is a song that is associated with a movement for protest and social change and hence part of the broader category of topical songs (or songs connected to current events). It may be folk, classical, or commercial in genre.

Among social movements that have an associated body of songs are the abolition movement, prohibition, women's suffrage, the labour movement, the human rights movement, civil rights, the Native American rights movement, the Jewish rights movement, disability rights, the anti-war movement and 1960s counterculture, art repatriation, opposition against blood diamonds, abortion rights, the feminist movement, the sexual revolution, the LGBT rights movement, masculism, animal rights movement, vegetarianism and veganism, gun rights, legalization of marijuana and environmentalism.

Protest songs are often situational, having been associated with a social movement through context. "Goodnight Irene", for example, acquired the aura of a protest song because it was written by Lead Belly, a black convict and social outcast, although on its face it is a love song. Or they may be abstract, expressing, in more general terms, opposition to injustice and support for peace, or free thought, but audiences usually know what is being referred to. Ludwig van Beethoven's "Ode to Joy", a song in support of universal brotherhood, is a song of this kind. It is a setting of a poem by Friedrich Schiller celebrating the continuum of living beings (who are united in their capacity for feeling pain and pleasure and hence for empathy), to which Beethoven himself added the lines that all men are brothers. Songs which support the status quo do not qualify as protest songs.

Protest song texts may have significant specific content. The labour movement musical Pins and Needles articulated a definition of a protest song in a number called "Sing Me a Song of Social Significance". Phil Ochs once explained, "A protest song is a song that's so specific that you cannot mistake it for BS." Some researchers have argued that protest songs must express opposition or, at the very least, offer some alternative solutions if they are limited to drawing attention to social issues. A broad definition, which does not exclude any upcoming form of creativity, defines a protest song as one performed by protesters.

An 18th-century example of a topical song intended as a feminist protest song is "Rights of Woman" (1795), sung to the tune of "God Save the King", written anonymously by "A Lady" and published in the Philadelphia Minerva, October 17, 1795. There is no evidence that it was ever sung as a movement song, however.

== Types ==
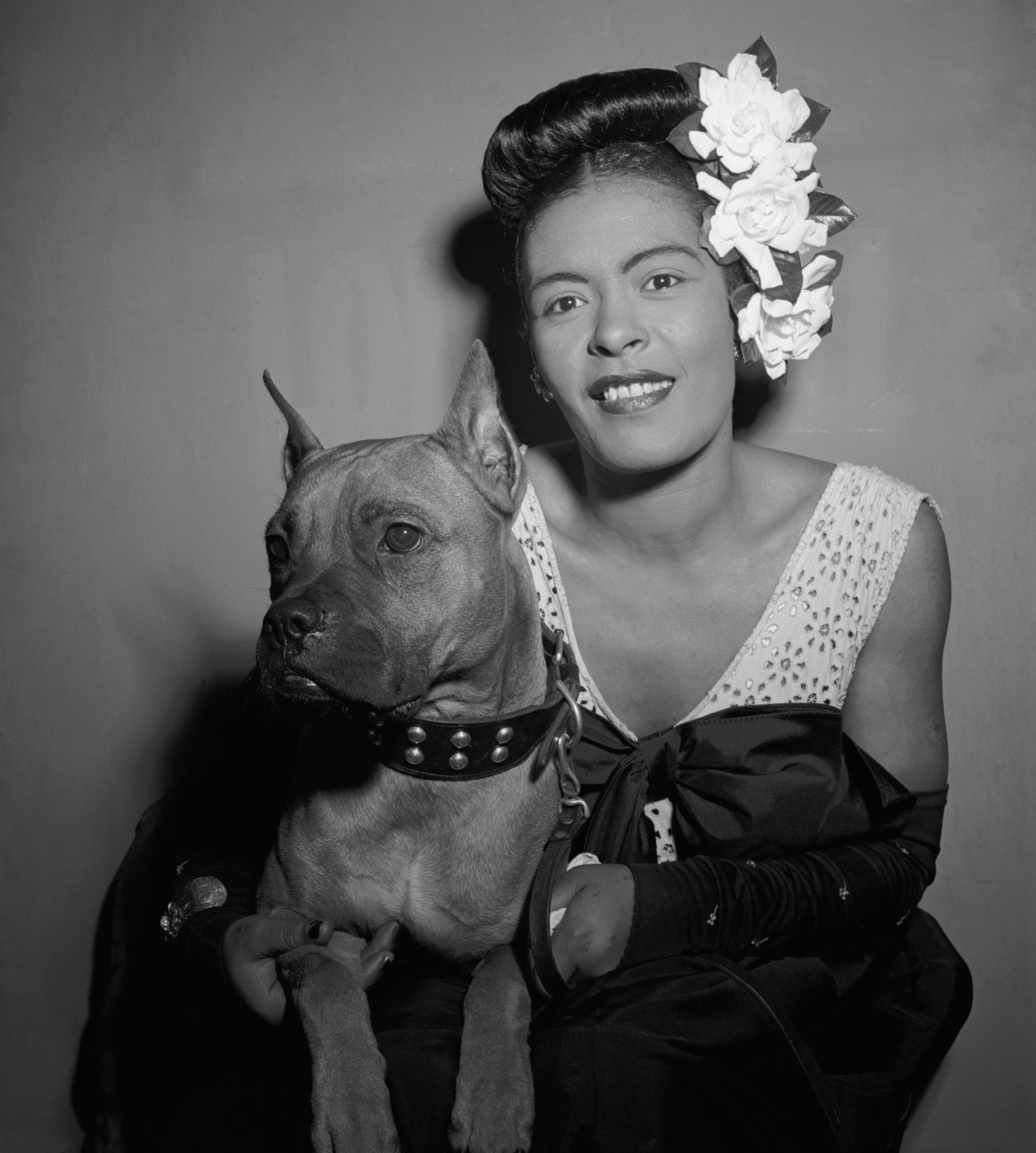
Billie Holiday’s haunting rendition of "Strange Fruit" powerfully protested violence, making it a "rhetorical" protest song of political and social systems of her time.

The sociologist R. Serge Denisoff saw protest songs rather narrowly in terms of their function, as forms of persuasion or propaganda. Denisoff saw the protest song tradition as originating in the "psalms" or songs of grassroots Protestant religious revival movements, terming these hymns "protest-propaganda", as well.

Denisoff subdivided protest songs as either "magnetic" or "rhetorical". "Magnetic" protest songs were aimed at attracting people to the movement and promoting group solidarity and commitment – for example, "Keep Your Eyes on the Prize" and "We Shall Overcome". "Rhetorical" protest songs, on the other hand, are often characterized by individual indignation and offer a straightforward political message designed to change political opinion. Denisoff argued that although "rhetorical" songs often are not overtly connected to building a larger movement, they should nevertheless be considered as "protest-propaganda". Examples include Bob Dylan's "Masters of War" (which contains the lines "I hope that you die / And your death'll come soon") and "What's Going On" by Marvin Gaye.

Ron Eyerman and Andrew Jamison, in Music and Social Movements: Mobilizing Tradition in the Twentieth Century (1998), take issue with what they consider Denisoff's reductive approach to the history and function of song (and particularly traditional song) in social movements. They point out that Denisoff had paid little attention to the song tunes of protest music, considered them strictly subordinate to the texts, a means to the message. It is true that in the highly text-oriented western European song tradition, tunes can be subordinate, interchangeable, and even limited in number (as in Portuguese fado, which only has 64 tunes), nevertheless, Eyerman and Jamison point out that some of the most effective protest songs gain power through their appropriation of tunes that are bearers of strong cultural traditions. They also note that:

There is more to music and movements than can be captured within a functional perspective, such as Denisoff's, which focuses on the use made of music within already-existing movements. Music, and song, we suggest, can maintain a movement even when it no longer has a visible presence in the form of organizations, leaders, and demonstrations, and can be a vital force in preparing the emergence of a new movement. Here the role and place of music needs to be interpreted through a broader framework in which tradition and ritual are understood as processes of identity and identification, as encoded and embodied forms of collective meaning and memory.

Martin Luther King Jr. described the freedom songs this way: "They invigorate the movement in a most significant way... these freedom songs serve to give unity to a movement."

== Africa ==
=== Algeria ===
Raï (Arabic: "opinion" رأي) is a form of folk music, originated in Oran, Algeria from Bedouin shepherds, mixed with Spanish, French, African and Arabic musical forms. Its origins date back to the 1920s and has been primarily evolved by the women referred to as cheikhas, who performed in cafes, bars or bordellos, often for men. A typical performance included the cheikhas accompanied by two to four male instrumentalists playing a gasba (a wooden flute) and gallal (a metal drum). Rai was considered a rejection of the traditional Algerian music of the time, and the cheikhas " . . . used lewd lyrics focusing on the hardships of life facing peasant women in a big city, the pain of love, the lure of alcohol, immigration, and mourning."

By the 1950s, and through the 1960s, male musicians began performing rai music and incorporated the use of what was considered to be modern musical instruments of that time, such as the violin, the accordion, the lute, and the trumpet. As the genre evolved over time, it continued to have associations with political movements and organizations, such as the Algerian Freedom Fighters who rallied against the French occupation. Even after Algeria achieved independence in 1962, Rai continued to have an adverse relationship with the Algerian government, which exerted a tight grip upon its culture. In fact, Raï had been banned from broadcast media, though it thrived in underground spaces, such as cabarets. It was forbidden to the point of one popular singer, Cheb Hasni, being assassinated. However, since the government lifted its restrictions on rai in the 1980s, it has enjoyed some considerable success.

The song "Parisien Du Nord" by Cheb Mami is a recent example of how the genre has been used as a form of protest, as the song was written as a protest against the racial tensions that sparked the 2005 French riots. According to Memi:

It is a song against racism, so I wanted to sing it with a North African who was born in France... Because of that and because of his talent, I chose K-Mel. In the song, we say, 'In your eyes, I feel like foreigner.' It's like the kids who were born in France but they have Arab faces. They are French, and they should be considered French."

Rai continues to be regarded, as Al-Neen states, "[the] music of rebellion and the symbol of cynicism. Rai has emerged as an outlet for voicing the frustrations of youths and placing greater emphasis on freedom and liberty."

=== Egypt ===
Ahmed Fouad Negm is considered a key dissident figure whose poetry in colloquial Arabic gave voice to the underclass in Egypt, and inspired protesters. He teamed up in the 1960s with composer Sheikh Imam Eissa who gave music to his verses, the partnership lasting for twenty years. Lines from Negm's poem "Who Are They, and Who Are We?" were chanted at Tahrir Square in 2011 during protests against President Hosni Mubarak.

Music played a key role in mobilizing the 2011 protests at Tahrir Square against President Hosni Mubarak which led to the Egyptian revolution. "Ezzay," meaning "How come?" by Egyptian singer and actor Mohamed Mounir is considered one of the most popular songs associated with the protests. "Irhal," meaning "Leave", by Ramy Essam became an internet hit, and was subsequently described in the media as having become an anthem for the revolution.

=== South Africa ===
==== Anti-apartheid ====
The majority of South African protest music of the 20th century concerned itself with apartheid, a system of legalized racial segregation in which blacks were stripped of their citizenship and rights from 1948 to 1994. As the apartheid regime forced Africans into townships and industrial centres, people sang about leaving their homes, the horror of the coal mines and the degradation of working as domestic servants. Examples of which include Benedict Wallet Vilakazi's "Meadowlands", the "Toyi-toyi" chant and "Bring Him Back Home" (1987) by Hugh Masekela, which became an anthem for the movement to free Nelson Mandela. The Special AKA wrote a song on Nelson Mandela called "Free Nelson Mandela". The track is upbeat and celebratory, drawing on musical influence from South Africa, was immensely popular in Africa. Masekela's song "Soweto Blues", sung by his former wife, Miriam Makeba, is a blues/jazz piece that mourns the carnage of the Soweto riots in 1976. Basil Coetzee and Abdullah Ibrahim's "Mannenberg" became an unofficial soundtrack to the anti-apartheid resistance.

In Afrikaans, the 1989 Voëlvry movement led by Johannes Kerkorrel, Koos Kombuis, and Bernoldus Niemand, provided a voice of opposition from within the white Afrikaner community. These musicians sought to redefine Afrikaner identity, and although met with opposition from the authorities, Voëlvry played to large crowds at Afrikaans university campuses and is quite popular among Afrikaner youth.

==== Post-apartheid ====
Following apartheid's demise, most Afrikaans writers and musicians followed public sentiments by embracing the new South Africa, but cracks soon emerged in the dream of the "rainbow nation" and criticism started to emerge, criticism that has grown in frequency and intensity in recent years. Violent crime put South Africa in the top category of most dangerous country in the world, along with poverty, government corruption, and the AIDS pandemic. For this reason, writers and musicians in which some of them veterans of anti-apartheid movements, are once again protesting against what they consider to be a government failing to uphold the promise of 'peace, democracy and freedom for all' that Nelson Mandela made upon his release from prison. By 2000, Johannes Kerkorrel claimed in the song "Die stad bloei vanaand" [The city bleeds tonight]: "the dream was promised, but just another lie has been sold."

Two Afrikaans compilation albums of predominantly protest music were released recently: Genoeg is genoeg [Enough is enough] (2007) and Vaderland [Fatherland] (2008), and Koos Kombuis also released a CD called Bloedrivier [Blood River] (2008), which is primarily a protest album. One track, "Waar is Mandela" [Where is Mandela] asks, "Where is Mandela when the shadows descend ... Where is the rainbow, where is the glory?" and another, "Die fokkol" song [The Nothing] song, tells tourists who visit South Africa for the 2010 Football World Cup that there is nothing in South Africa; no jobs, no petrol, no electric power, not even jokes. However, these compilations only represent the tip of the iceberg, as many prominent musicians have included protest songs on recent albums, including Bok van Blerk, Fokofpolisiekar, and KOBUS!.

The reality of the New South Africa is decidedly violent and crime is a well-known theme in post-apartheid Afrikaans protest music. The punk group Fokofpolisiekar (which translates to fuck off police car) sings in "Brand Suid-Afrika" [Burn South Africa]: "For you knives lie in wait, in the garden outside you house," and Radio Suid-Afrika sings in "Bid" [Pray]: "Pray that no-one will be waiting in the garden, pray for strength and for mercy in each dark day." Theirs is a country of "murder and child rape" where the only respite is alcohol abuse. In "Blaas hom" [Blow him away] by the industrial band Battery9, the narrator sings how he gleefully unloads his gun on a burglar after being robbed for the third time, and in "Siek bliksems" [Sick bastards] Kristoe Strauss asks God to help against the "sick bastards" responsible for hijackings. The metal band KOBUS! pleads for a reinstatement of the death penalty in "Doodstraf", because they feel the promise of peace has not been realized. In "Reconciliation Day", Koos Kombuis sings: "Our streets run with blood, every day a funeral procession, they steal all our goods, on Reconciliation Day." Elsewhere he states, "we're in a state of war." The video of this song features a lawless microcosm of theft, rape and abuse – a lawlessness reflected in Valiant Swart's "Sodom en Gomorra": "two cities in the north, without laws, without order, too wonderful for words." Hanru Niemand rewrites the traditional Afrikaans song Sarie Marais, turning it into a murder ballad speculating on where Sarie's body will be found. The new protest musicians also parody Voëlvry's music: Johannes Kerkorrel's "Sit dit af" [Switch it off] – a satire on P. W. Botha of the apartheid regime – is turned into "Sit dit aan" [Switch it on] by Koos Kombuis, now a song protesting mismanagement resulting in chronic power failures.

Much of the protest by Afrikaans musicians concerns the legacy of apartheid: In "Blameer dit op apartheid" [Blame it on apartheid] Koos Kombuis sings how "the whole country is evil," yet the situation is blamed on apartheid. Klopjag, in "Ek sal nie langer" [I will no longer] sings that they will no longer apologize for apartheid, a theme echoed by many others, including Koos Kombuis in "Hoe lank moet ons nog sorry sê" [For how long do we still have to say sorry]. Piet Paraat sings in "Toema Jacob Zuma" [Never mind Jacob Zuma]: "My whole life I'm punished for the sins of my father." There is also a distinct feeling that the Afrikaner is being marginalized by the ANC government: Fokofpolisiekar sings in "Antibiotika" [Antibiotics], "I'm just a tourist in the country of my birth," Bok van Blerk sings in "Die kleur van my vel" [The colour of my skin] that the country does not want him despite his willingness to work, because he is white, even though white South Africans have the lowest rate of unemployment, and in "Bloekomboom" Rian Malan uses the metaphor of a blue gum tree (an alien species) to plead that Afrikaners should not be regarded as settlers, but as part of the nation. Steve Hofmeyr has incorrectly expressed concern about the statistically high murders of Afrikaner farmers, and has also appealed in several speeches to remember Afrikaner heritage. His songs "Ons Sal Dit Oorleef" (We will survive this) and "My Kreed" (My Cry) also echoes many Afrikaners' fears of losing their culture and rights. The appeals by these musicians, and several others, to be included follows a sense of exclusion manifested in the political, linguistic and economic realms, an exclusion depicted particularly vividly by Bok van Blerk's "Kaplyn" [Cut line], a song that laments that fallen South African soldiers have been omitted in one of the country's show-case memorials, the Freedom Park Memorial, despite official claims of it being a memorial for all who had fought for the country.

=== Tunisia ===
Emel Mathlouthi composed songs since a young age which called for freedom and dignity in a Tunisia ruled by the dictator Zine El Abidine Ben Ali, earning her scrutiny from internal security forces and forcing her to retreat to Paris. Banned from the official airwaves, her protest songs found listeners on social media. In late 2010 and early 2011, Tunisian protesters referred to her song Kelmti Horra (my word is free) as an anthem of the Tunisian Revolution.

== Asia ==
=== China ===
The Chinese singer-songwriter Cui Jian's 1986 song "Nothing to My Name" was popular with protesters in Tiananmen Square.

The Chinese singer Li Zhi made references to the Tiananmen Square massacre in his songs and were subsequently banned from China in 2019. Three years later, during the anti-lockdown protests in China, this was used as a protest song across YouTube.

=== Hong Kong ===
Hong Kong rock band Beyond's "Boundless Oceans Vast Skies" (1993) and "Glory Days" (光輝歲月) (1990) have been considered as protest anthems in various social movements.

During the 2019–20 Hong Kong protests, Les Misérables' "Do You Hear The People Sing" (1980) and Thomas dgx yhl's "Glory to Hong Kong" (2019) were sung in support of the movement. The latter has been widely adopted as the anthem of these protests, with some even regarding it as the "national anthem of Hong Kong".

=== India ===
Cultural activism in India has always been considered one of the most effective tools to mobilise people into making a social change since pre-independence times. India provided many examples of protest songs throughout its struggle for freedom from Britain.

Indian rapper Raftaar's "Mantoiyat" lashes out at corrupt politicians and police and brings to light injustices that plague the country. In the song he talks about deep rooted issues and brings light to the hypocrisy of the people and the government. Artists such as Poojan Sahil, Seedhe Maut, Vishkyun, Prabh Deep, Rapper Shaz, Sumit Roy & Ahmer usually talk about social issues in their songs. The rock fusion band Indian Ocean's song "Chitu" was one of their first and prominent songs, a tribal anthem that Ram had come across over the course of being involved in the Narmada Movement.

In 2019, India's citizenship Law led to a mass protest all over the country. Artists like Varun Grover, Poojan Sahil, Rapper Shaz & Madara joined the cause with their own sonic protest.

In more contemporary times, protest music has been a regular feature of movements in India. The Dalit rights movement especially uses music to further its goals. The Kabir Kala Manch is one such well known troupe of singers who used their performances to raise awareness and support for their cause. The widely acclaimed documentary film, Jai Bhim Comrade, highlighted the work of Kabir Kala Manch and presented this form of protest music to both Indian as well as international audiences. Similar, albeit less known, Dalit musical groups exist in various parts of India.

The leftist movements of India too use protest music along with street plays as a means to propagate their message amongst the masses. Protest music was a big feature of plays organized by the Indian People's Theatre Association (IPTA). Similar organisations formed after the break-up of IPTA and highly influenced by its work, like the Jana Natya Manch (JANAM), also made protest music a regular feature of their plays. In recent decades, however, the Left's cultural activism has increasingly been relegated to the margins of the cultural sphere. Some attribute this to the political decline of the mainstream Left in India, as well as a shift in focus to local movements and languages as identity politics took a greater hold of Indian Polity.

Protest music also features regularly in protests held by other mainstream national parties of India.

=== Iran ===
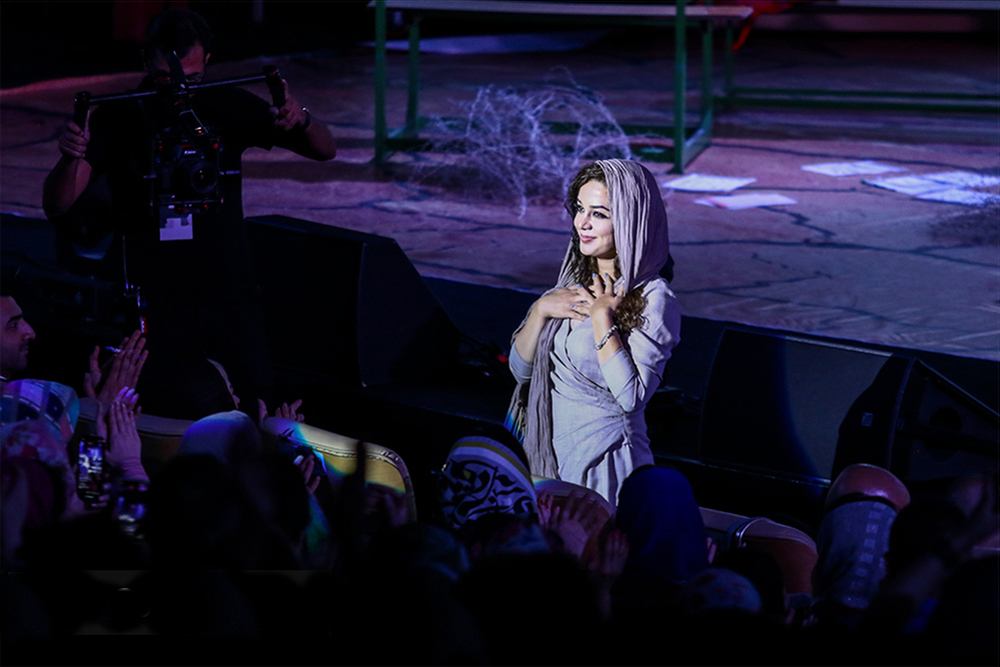
Mona Borzouei co-wrote "Woman's Anthem", a key protest song during the 2022 Mahsa Amini protests, highlighting women's struggles in Iran.

Fereydoun Farokhzad's "Sad Eastern"—which its title is referring to Iranian people—is considered as one of the first Iranian protest songs. Due to the free speech limitations at the time of the song was first sang (1969 or 1970), it is a light protest song talking about "freedom" and "not giving up of our land" Iran.

Since it is illegal to criticize the government and social issues in Iran after the 1979 Iranian Revolution, most of the Iranian artists who make protest songs live abroad. Protest songs in Iran have a long history due to the long history of Human rights violations by the Islamic Republic of Iran.

One of the most important protest songs of Iran is Hichkas's "A Good Day Will Come" which is often considered as the most influential Iranian protest song. "A Good Day Will Come" was released a year after the 2009 Iranian presidential election protests, one of the most violent protests in Iran.

"Iran Iran" which is the debut single of rapper Fadaei, was also released a year after the 2009 Iranian presidential election protests mentioning the killing of Neda Agha-Soltan and the 2009 Kahrizak Detention Center disaster.

After the death of over 1500 protesters in the 2019–2020 Iranian protests —which is best known as Bloody November due to its massive brutality— Iranian artists who live abroad released many protest songs include Hichkas's "Clenched His Fists" —which was released one month after the start of the protests— and "Hit", Fadaei's "Overthrow" (also mentions 2021 Sistan and Baluchestan protests) and "From Karaj to Langerud" (Inspired by the death of Pezhman Gholipour). As of now, Bloody November has been mentioned many times in protest songs.

After the death of Mahsa Amini on September 16, 2022, who was arrested for alleged wearing her Hijab improperly and later died after she had been —according to eyewitnesses— severely beaten by religious morality police officers, a massive global protests sparked all around the world and many Iranian artists released protest songs. Among all of the songs, Shervin Hajipour's "For" —which was released twelve days after Amini's death— became an instant hit and immediately turned into the unofficial "anthem" of the uprising. It was widely used during gatherings, from schools and universities to streets, both nationwide and across the globe. It was broadly circulated in social media and foreign TV channels and radio stations as well. The song also served as the backdrop for several other forms of art such as video works, graphic design and performance art. On November 11, 2022, Roxana Saberi reported the song as "the most viral tune to ever come out of Iran". Since its release, "For" has become the single most covered protest song in Iran's history. Hajipour was later arrested for the song and released on bail five days later, banned from any musical activity.

Other Iranian notable protest songs which were released during Mahsa Amini protests includes Mehdi Yarrahi's "Woman's Anthem", "Life's Anthem" and "Cage is Enough", Hichkas's "This One Is Also For", Fadaei's heavy political theme album "Right" —which includes "Tawaf" and "Blood" protest songs— and "Conquer" (Inspired by the execution of Majidreza Rahnavard), Shapur's "Death to the Whole System", Toomaj Salehi's "Battleground" and "Omen", Ethnic Musician's "Freedom's Anthem", Koorosh and Sami Low's "Us", Shahin Najafi's "Gen Z" and "The Morning of Revenge".

Majid Entezami's "Khorramshahr Symphony" —which was re-released on October 13, 2022, and its title is referring to Khorramshahr's 1980 and 1982 battles— was also used multiple times on protest videos including women cutting their hair and calls for protests.

Many artists have been arrested in Iran after releasing protest songs following the 2022 Mahsa Amini protests includes Shervin Hajipour, Mona Borzouei (Lyricist of Mehdi Yarrahi's "Woman's Anthem") and Toomaj Salehi. Salehi was arrested on October 30, 2022, for his social awareness activities on his social media and releasing the two protest songs "Battleground" and "Omen" during the Mahsa Amini protests. On November 27, 2022, Iranian media revealed that Salehi was charged with "corruption on Earth", an offense which could carry the death penalty.

In March 2023, rapper Fadaei released another protest song associated with the 2022–2023 Iranian protests titled "Black". The song was very controversial due to its Maddahi singing style mixed with pop music. It also contains heavy protest lyrics and Chaharshanbe Suri-Muharram-Nowruz themes.

=== Israel ===
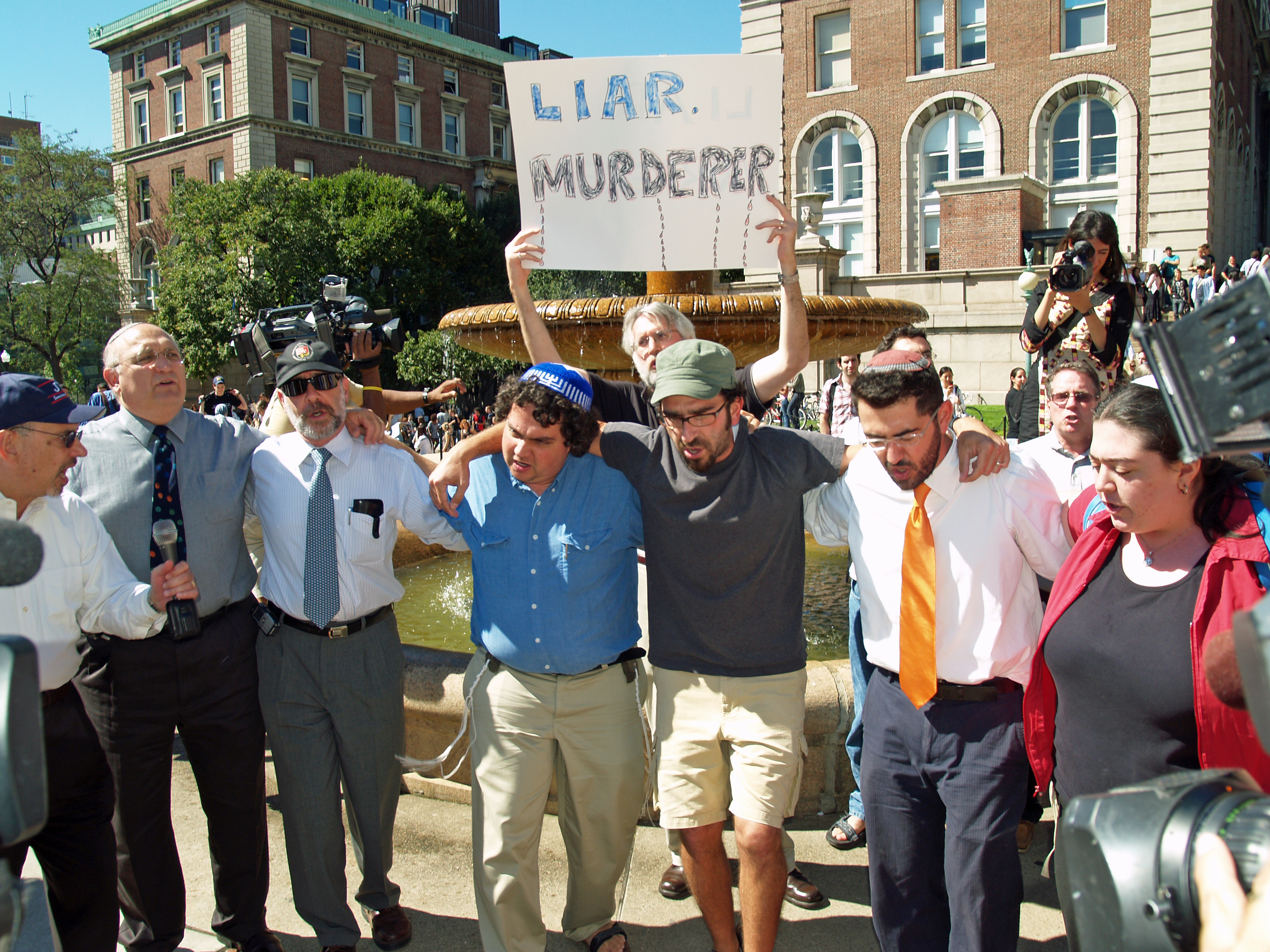
Jews singing Hebrew protest songs when Iranian President Mahmoud Ahmadinejad spoke at Columbia University in 2007

Israel's protest music has often become associated with different political factions.

During the 1967 war, Naomi Shemer added a third verse to her song "Jerusalem of Gold", sung by Shuli Natan, about the recapturing of Jerusalem after 2,000 years. Later on that year, a different point of view of the song was introduced by the folk singer Meir Ariel, who recorded an anti-war version and named it "Jerusalem of Iron".

Gush Emunim supporters have taken a repertoire of old religious songs and invested them with political meaning. An example is the song "Utsu Etsu VeTufar" (They gave counsel but their counsel was violated). The song signifies the ultimate rightness of those steadfast in their beliefs, suggesting the rightness of Gush Emunim's struggle against anti-settlement policy by the government.

Minutes before Prime Minister Yitzhak Rabin was murdered at a political rally in November 1995, Israeli folk singer Miri Aloni sang the Israeli pop song "Shir Lashalom" ("Song for Peace"). This song, originally written in 1969 and performed extensively at the time by an Israeli military performing group, has become one of the anthems of the Israeli peace camp.

During the Arab uprising known as the First Intifada, Israeli singer Si Heyman sang "Yorim VeBokhim" ("Shoot and Weep") to protest Israeli policy in the territories. Pink Floyd's "Another Brick in the Wall" is used as a protest song by some opponents of Israel's barrier in the West Bank. The lyrics were adapted to: "We don't need no occupation. We don't need no racist wall."

Since the onset of the Oslo Process and, more recently, Israel's unilateral disengagement plan, protest songs became a major avenue for opposition activists to express sentiments. Songs protesting these policies were written and performed by Israeli musicians such as Ariel Zilber, Aharon Razel, and others.

=== Myanmar ===
During the 8888 Uprising, Burmese composer Naing Myanmar penned "Kabar Makyay Bu" (ကမ္ဘာမကျေဘူး), rendered in English as "We Won't Be Satisfied till the End of the World" as a protest song. Set to the tune of Kansas' "Dust in the Wind", the song quickly gained popularity across the country, as an emotional appeal for freedom. The song was recorded and distributed on cassette tapes, reaching millions of Burmese eventually becoming an anthem of the 8888 Uprising.

In the aftermath of the 2021 Myanmar coup d'etat, the country's nascent civil disobedience movement has revitalized this song, performing it during protests and acts of civil disobedience.

=== Palestine ===
Palestinian music (Arabic: موسيقى فلسطينية) deals with the conflict with Israel, the longing for peace, and the love of the Palestinians' land. A typical example of such a song is "Biladi, Biladi" (My Country, My Country), which has become the unofficial Palestinian national anthem.

Another example is the song "Al-Quds (Jerusalem) our Land", with words by Sharif Sabri. The song, sung by Amr Diab from Port Said, Egypt, won first prize in 2003 in a contest in Egypt for video clips produced in the West Bank and Gaza. DAM is an Arabic hip-hop group, rapping in Arabic and Hebrew about the problems faced by Palestinians under occupation and calling for change. Kamilya Jubran's song "Ghareeba", a setting of a poem by Khalil Gibran, deals with a sense of isolation and loneliness felt by the Palestinian woman.

=== Pakistan ===
Protest music in Pakistan has been deeply inspired by South Asian traditions since pre-independence times.

The song "Hum Dekhenge" is just one example of protest music from Pakistan. Faiz Ahmed, a poet and a prominent Pakistani Marxist, originally penned the poem with the same title as a response to General Zia ul Haq's repressive dictatorship. The poem is considered a critical commentary of Zia's brand of authoritarian Islam. His political beliefs set him up as a natural critic of General Zia Ul Haq. In 1985, as part of Zia's programme of forced Islamicization, the sari, part of the traditional attire for women on the subcontinent was banned. That year, Iqbal Bano, one of Pakistan's best-loved singers and artists, sang Hum Dekhenge to an audience of 50,000 people in a Lahore stadium wearing a black sari. The recording was smuggled out and distributed on bootleg cassette tapes across the country. Cries of "Inquilab Zindabad" ("Long Live Revolution") and thunderous applause from the audience can be heard on the recording on YouTube. Faiz was in prison at the time.

The song has, since the fall of the Zia dictatorship, regularly featured in protests in Pakistan. More recently, a newer rendition of the song by Pakistani singer, Rahat Fateh Ali Khan, was used as the title song for the political party, Pakistan Tehreek-e-Insaf, in the 2013 Pakistani general election, and in the Azadi march of 2014.

The international anthem girti hui deewaron ko aik dhakka aur do by famous poet Ali Arshad Mir created in the 1970s found profound place in various protests. This revolutionary anthem is still in use in resistance movements against oppressive political regimes and failing institutions by politicians and common people alike.

=== Philippines ===
From the revolutionary songs of the Katipunan to the songs being sung by the New People's Army, Filipino protest music deals with poverty, oppression as well as anti-imperialism and independence. A typical example was during the American era, as Jose Corazon de Jesus created a well-known protest song entitled "Bayan Ko", which calls for redeeming the nation against oppression, mainly colonialism, and also became popular as a song against the Marcos regime.

During the 1960s, Filipino protest music became aligned with the ideas of Communism as well as of revolution. The protest song "Ang Linyang Masa" came from Mao Zedong and his Mass Line and "Papuri sa Pag-aaral" was from Bertolt Brecht. These songs, although Filipinized, rose to become another part of Filipino protest music known as Revolutionary songs that became popular during protests and campaign struggles.

=== South Korea ===
Commonly, protest songs in South Korea are known as Minjung Gayo (Korean: 민중 가요, literally "People's song"), and the genre of protest songs is called "Norae Undong", translating to the literal meaning "song movement". The starting point of Korean protest songs was the music culture of Korean students movements around 1970. It was common in the 1970s~1980s, especially before and after of the June Democracy Movement in 1987, and associated with against the military governments of presidents Park Chung Hee and Chun Doo Hwan reflecting the will of crowd and voices of criticism of the day. From the middle of the 1990s, following the democratization of South Korea, Korean protest songs have lost their popularity. There has been a resurgence of protest songs due to the 2024 South Korean martial law crisis.

=== Taiwan ===
"Island's Sunrise" (Chinese: 島嶼天光) is the theme song of 2014 Sunflower Student Movement in Taiwan. Also, the theme song of Lan Ling Wang TV drama series Into The Array Song (Chinese: 入陣曲), sung by Mayday, expressed all the social and political controversies during Taiwan under the president Ma Ying-jeou administration.

=== Thailand ===
In Thailand, protest songs are known as Phleng phuea chiwit (Thai: เพลงเพื่อชีวิต, IPA: [pʰlēːŋ pʰɯ̂a tɕʰīː.wít]; lit. "songs for life"), a music genre that originated in the '70s, by famous artists such as Caravan, Carabao, Pongthep Kradonchamnan and Pongsit Kamphee.

=== Turkey ===
The roots of the rebellious/protest music in Anatolia goes back to the 16th century. Asiks who lived in that era, like Pir Sultan Abdal, Koroglu and Dadaloğlu who lived in the 18th century are still the inspirations. The tradition of rebellion have gone for centuries and have given many song to this geography's culture. The message in Turkish protest music has been against inequality, lack of freedom, poverty, and the freedom of expression. Milder elements in this style are referred to as progressive, while some die-hard protest musicians have been prosecuted, and sometimes persecuted, in the 20th century Turkey. More than a few Turkish singers have been forced to exile, most notably Cem Karaca, who later returned to Turkey during freer conditions and atmosphere. Typically, protest music bands are leftist bands with a huge following, especially in high schools and universities. The music is a crossover between folk and rock and the lyrics are about freedom, repression and uprising, capitalism and the oppressed, and the revolution that never comes. It's customary to say anti-American slogans here and there. The male singers always have what is called a Davidian voice (meaning deep and husky a la Barry White) and the females usually sing nasally with a high pitch. Some popular examples are Duman, Grup Yorum and Selda Bagcan.

== Europe ==
=== Belarus ===
The first famous Belarusian protest songs were created at the beginning of the 20th century during the rise of the Belarusian People's Republic and war for independence from the Russian Empire and Soviet Russia. This period includes such protest songs as "Advieku My Spali" ("We've slept enough", also known as Belarusian Marselliese) and "Vajaćki Marš" ("March of the Warriors"), which was an anthem of the Belarusian People's Republic. The next period of protest songs was in the 1990s, with many created by such bands as NRM, Novaje Nieba and others, which led to the unspoken prohibition of these musicians. As an example, Lavon Volski, frontman of NRM, Mroja and Krambambulia, had issues with officials at the majority of his concert due to the criticism of the Belarusian political system. One of the most famous bands of Belarus, Lyapis Trubetskoy, was forbidden from performing in the country due to being critical of Aleksandr Lukashenka in his lyrics. These prohibitions lead most "forbidden" bands to organize concerts in Vilnius, which, though situated in modern Lithuania, is considered to be a Belarusian historical capital because less than a hundred years ago most dwellers of Vilnius (Vilnia, as it was called before it was given to Lithuania) were Belarusians. But in the middle of the 2010s, the situation began to change a bit and many protest bands started to organize concerts in Belarus.

=== Estonia ===
Many of the songs performed at the Estonian Laulupidu are protest songs, particularly those written during the Singing Revolution. Due to the official position of the Soviet Union at the time, the lyrics are frequently allusive, rather than explicitly anti-Soviet, such as Tõnis Mägi's song Koit. In contrast, Eestlane olen ja eestlaseks jään, sung by Ivo Linna and the group In Spe is explicitly in favour of an Estonian identity.

=== Finland ===
Finland has a tradition of socialist and communist protest songs going back to the Finnish Civil War, most of which were imported and translated from Soviet Russia. In the 21st century the socialist protest song tradition is somewhat continued by left wing rap artists and to lesser degree in more traditional Taistoist form by KOM-theatre choir.

In Finland, modern protest songs became more widespread, particularly in the mid-1960s, taking their cue from American folk music. Among the best-known Finnish protest singers was Irwin Goodman, whose 1976 song "Haistakaa paska koko valtiovalta" ("Fuck the Whole State Apparatus") criticizes, among other things, the heavy taxation he faced.

=== France ===
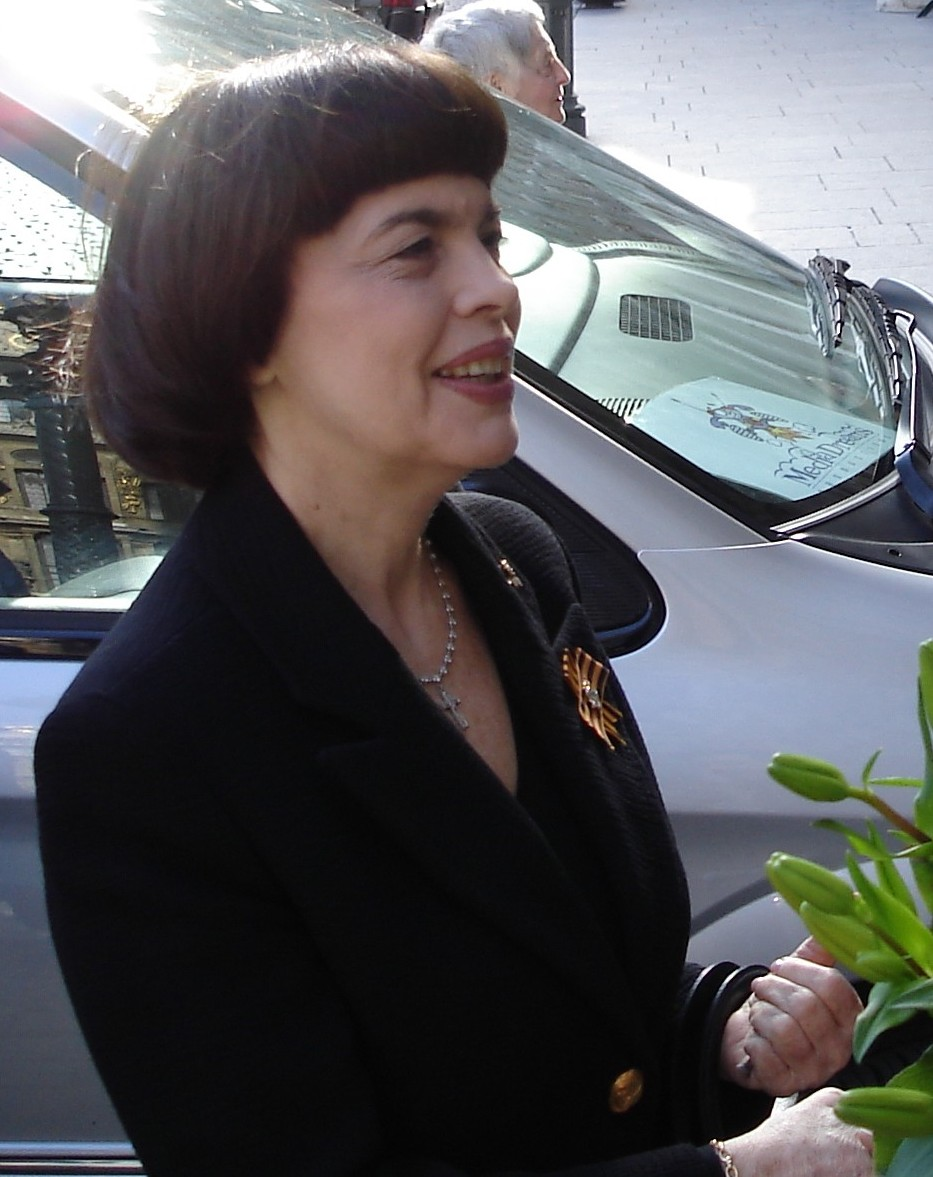
Mireille Mathieu is known for her song "Une femme amoureuse", reflecting themes of freedom and emotion.

"The Internationale" ("L'Internationale" in French) is a socialist, anarchist, communist, and social-democratic anthem.

"The Internationale" became the anthem of international socialism. Its original French refrain is C'est la lutte finale/ Groupons-nous et demain/ L'Internationale/ Sera le genre humain. (Freely translated: "This is the final struggle/ Let us join together and tomorrow/ The Internationale/ Will be the human race.") The "Internationale" has been translated into most of the world's languages. Traditionally it is sung with the hand raised in a clenched fist salute. "The Internationale" is sung not only by communists but also (in many countries) by socialists or social democrats. The Chinese version was also a rallying song of the students and workers at the Tiananmen Square protests of 1989.

There is not so much a protest song trend in France, but rather of a permanent background of criticism and contestation, and individuals who personify it. World War II and its horrors forced French singers to think more critically about war in general, forcing them to question their governments and the powers who ruled their society.

Jazz trumpeter and singer Boris Vian's was one of the first to protest against the Algerian war with his anti-war song "Le déserteur" (The deserter), which was banned by the government.

Several French songwriters, such as Léo Ferré (1916–1993), Georges Brassens (1921–1981), Jacques Brel (1929–1978) (actually a Belgian singer), Maxime Le Forestier (born 1949) or interpreters (Yves Montand, Marcel Mouloudji, Serge Reggiani, Graeme Allwright ...) often wrote or sang songs aligned against majority ideas and political powers. Because racial tensions did not rise to the same levels as those in the United States, criticism was focused more toward bourgeoisie, power, religion, and songs defending liberty of thought, speech and action. After 1945, immigration became a source of inspiration for some singers: Pierre Perret (born 1934), well known for his humorous songs, started writing several more "serious" and committed songs against racism ("Lily", 1977), which critically pointed out everyday racist behaviour in French society.

Brassens wrote several songs protesting war, hate, intolerance ("Les Deux Oncles" ["The Two Uncles"], "La Guerre de 14–18" ["14–18 War"], "Mourir pour des idées" ["To Die for Ideas"] "Les Patriotes" ["The Patriots"] ...), against chauvinism ("La Ballade des gens qui sont nés quelque part" ["Ballad of People Who Are Born Somewhere"]), against bourgeoisie ("La Mauvaise Réputation" ["The bad reputation"], "Les Philistins" ["The Philistines"] ...). He was often called "anarchist" because of his songs on representatives of law and order (and religion) ("Le Gorille" ["The gorilla"] "Hécatombe" ["Slaughter"] "Le Nombril des femmes d'agents" ["The navel of cops wives"], "Le Mécréant" ["The miscreant"] ...).

Ferré was also called an "anarchist". He sang against consumerism ("Vitrines" ["Shop Fronts"], "Chanson mécanisée" ["Mechanized Song"], "Il n'y a plus rien" ["There is nothing left"] ...), against French war ("Miss guéguerre" ["Miss Squabble"], "Pacific blues", "Regardez-les" ["Look at them"], "Mon général" ["My general"], "Les Temps difficiles" ["Hard Times"], "La Marseillaise"), death penalty ("Ni Dieu ni maître" ["No God no Master"], "La Mort des loups" ["The Death of the Wolves"]), Estate control ("La Gueuse", "La Complainte de la télé" ["Lament of TV"], "La Révolution" ["Revolution"], "Le Conditionnel de variétés" ["Middle of the road music conditional mood"]), illusion of representative democracy ("Ils ont voté" ["They voted"], "La Grève" ["Strike"]), dictatorships ("Franco la muerte", "Allende", "La Violence et l'Ennui" ["Words ... Words ... Words ... "]), sexual hypocrisy and freedom ("Le Chien" ["The Dog"], "Le Mal" ["Evil"], "Ton style" ["Your style"], "La Damnation" ["Damnation"] ...).

Brel's work is another ode to freedom ("Ces gens-là" ["These people"], "Les Bourgeois" ["The Bourgeois"], "Jaurès", "Les Bigotes" ["The bigots"], "Le Colonel" ["The colonel"], "Le Caporal Casse-Pompon" ["Corporal Break-Nots"]).

=== Germany ===
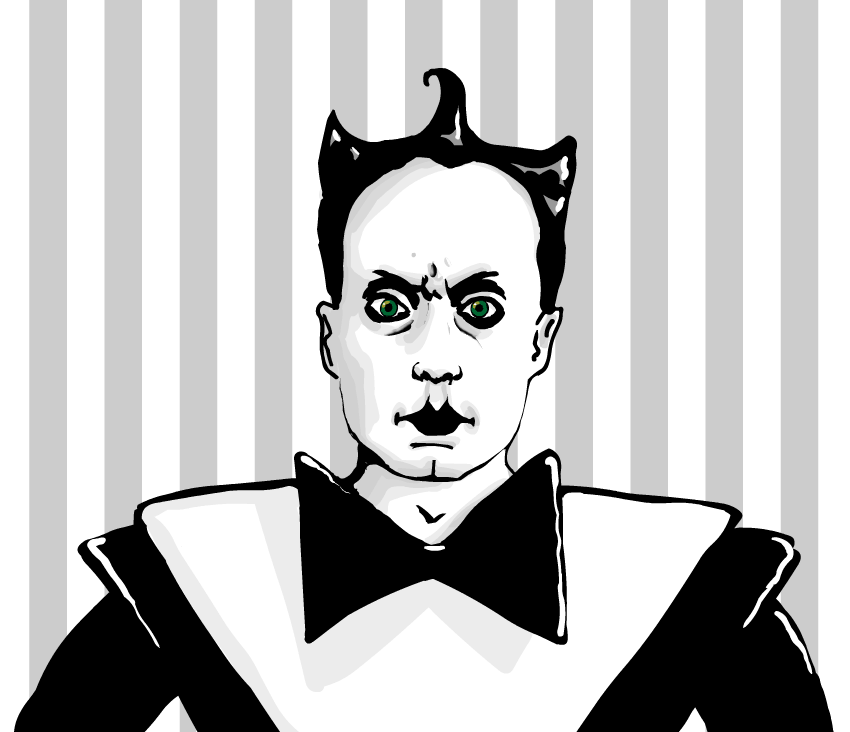
Klaus Nomi's collaborator and influential figure in the punk and protest scene

Ton Steine Scherben, one of the first and most influential German language rock bands of the 1970s and early 1980s, were well known for the highly political lyrics of vocalist Rio Reiser. The band became a musical mouthpiece of new left movements, such as the squatting movement, during that time in Germany and their hometown of West Berlin in particular. Their lyrics were, at the beginning, anti-capitalist and anarchist, and the band had connections to members of the German Red Army Faction movement before they became illegal. Later songs were about more complex issues such as unemployment ("Mole Hill Rockers") or homosexuality ("Mama war so"). They also contributed to plays and two full-length concept albums about homosexuality by the Hamburg theatre group Brühwarm (literally: boiling warm).

A dissatisfied German youth in the late 1970s and early 1980s resulted in a strand of highly politicized German-language Punkrock ("Deutschpunk"), which mostly concerned itself with politically radical left-wing lyrics, mostly influenced by the Cold War. Probably the most important German-language punk band was Slime from Hamburg, who were the first band whose LP was banned because of political topics. Their songs "Deutschland" ("Germany"), "Bullenschweine", "Polizei SA/SS", and the anti-imperialist "Yankees raus" ("Yankees out") were banned, some of them are still banned today, because they propagated the use of violence against the police or compared the police to the SA and SS of Nazi Germany.

The Cologne-based rock group BAP is known for their committed and intelligently written lyrics, dealing with discrimination and the power games of Germany's political elites in many of their songs. The song "Kristallnaach" (1982) is a point in case. It analyses the corruptibility of the present-day masses for new forms of fascism, while referring to the "Night of Broken Glass" that took place in 1938.

In East Germany, protesting against the state was often prohibited. Despite this, the song Ermutigung by Wolf Biermann became a widely popular protest song against the SED government.

=== Ireland ===
==== Irish rebel songs ====
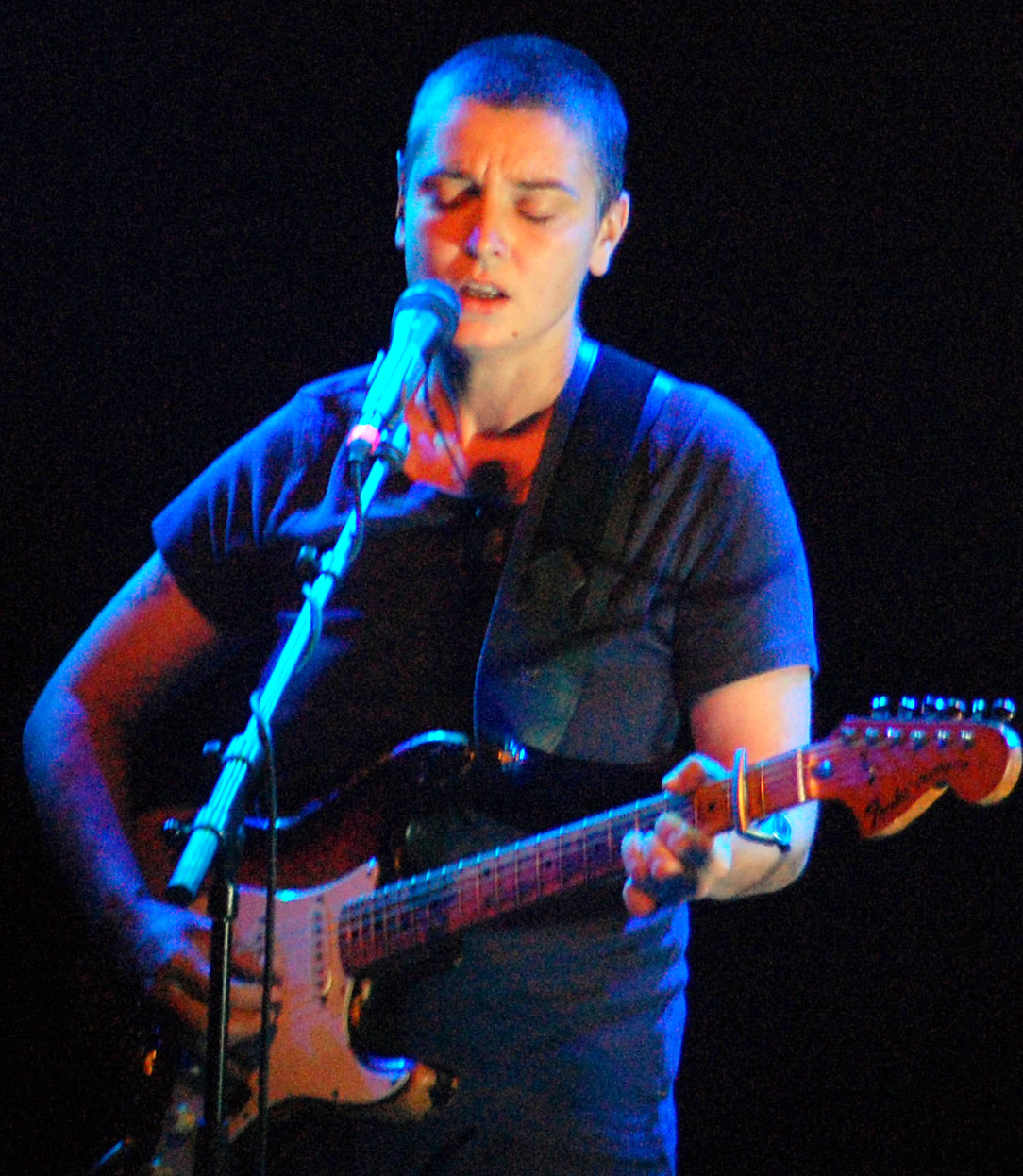
Sinead O'Connor is known for her political songs, including "The Foggy Dew", reflecting Irish rebel music themes.

Irish rebel music is a subgenre of Irish folk music, played on typically Irish instruments (such as the Fiddle, tin whistle, Uilleann pipes, accordion, bodhrán etc.) and acoustic guitars. The lyrics deal with the fight for Irish independence, people who were involved in liberation movements, the persecution and violence during Northern Ireland's Troubles and the history of Ireland's numerous rebellions.

Among the many examples of the genre, some of the most famous are "A Nation Once Again", "Come out Ye Black and Tans", "Erin go Bragh", "The Fields of Athenry", "The Men Behind the Wire" and the Republic of Ireland's national anthem "Amhrán na bhFiann" ("The Soldier's Song"). Music of this genre has often courted controversy, and some of the more outwardly anti-British songs have been effectively banned from the airwaves in both England and the Republic of Ireland.

Paul McCartney also made a contribution to the genre with his 1972 single "Give Ireland Back to the Irish", which he wrote as a reaction to Bloody Sunday in Northern Ireland on January 30, 1972. The song also faced an all-out ban in the UK, and has never been re-released or appeared on any Paul McCartney or Wings best-ofs. The same year McCartney's former colleague John Lennon released two protest songs concerning the hardships of war-torn Northern Ireland: "Sunday Bloody Sunday", written shortly after the 1972 massacre of Irish civil rights activists (which differs from U2's 1983 song of the same title in that it directly supports the Irish Republican cause and does not call for peace), and "The Luck of the Irish", both from his album Some Time in New York City (1972).

The Wolfe Tones have become legendary in Ireland for their contribution to the Irish rebel genre. The band has been recording since 1963 and has attracted worldwide fame and attention through their renditions of traditional Irish songs and originals, dealing with the former conflict in Northern Ireland. In 2002 the Wolfe Tones' version of "A Nation Once Again", a nationalist song from the 19th century, was voted the greatest song in the world in a poll conducted by the BBC World Service.

An Irish alternative rock/post punk band from Dublin, U2 broke with the rebel musical tradition when in 1983 they wrote their song "Sunday Bloody Sunday". The song makes reference to two separate massacres in Irish history of civilians by British forces – Bloody Sunday (1920) and Bloody Sunday 1972 – however, unlike other songs dealing with those events, the lyrics call for peace as opposed to revenge.

The Cranberries' hit "Zombie", written during their English tour in 1993, is in memory of two boys, Jonathan Ball and Tim Parry, who were killed in an IRA bombing in Warrington.

=== Netherlands ===
In 1626 the Dutch national anthem “Wilhelmus” was composed, it was a song in support of Willem van Oranje who lead the Dutch against the Spaniards in the Eighty Years War.

In 1966 Boudewijn de Groot released "Welterusten meneer de president" ("Good night mister president"), a song about the Vietnam War. The song spent 12 weeks in the Dutch Top 40 and to this day it remains an important song in nederpop and among Dutch protest songs. Following "Welterusten meneer de president", Boudewijn de Groot and Lennaert Nijgh, a Dutch lyricist, made more protest songs. The couple inspired other Dutch musicians, namely Armand and Robert Long. 'Tweede Kamer' by Sophie Straat and Goldband is a ska protest song against the lack of female leadership in the Netherlands, urging Dutch voters to 'vote for a woman'.

=== Portugal ===
The protest songs in Portugal were mostly associated with the antifascist movement and developed chiefly among students and activists. The best known are songs by Paulo de Carvalho and José Afonso, respectively "E Depois do Adeus" (And After the Goodbye) and "Grândola Vila Morena"(Grândola Swarthy Town). They were chosen as a code to start the Carnation Revolution that would successfully triumph against the dictatorial regime. The first was written out of letters that the author, then fighting to maintain the colonies (a war that the general public was against) sent to his wife. Hence the title refers to his departure "goodbye" to the war. The other song was very explicit regarding his objective: "O Povo é quem mais ordena / dentro de ti oh cidade" (The people is the one who orders the most/ inside of you oh city). "E Depois do Adeus" was vague enough to elude the censorship and pass as an "end of love" song, which also accounts for the order of the broadcast.

Of the two, Zeca Afonso was more prolific and more identified with the movement, so much so that another of his songs was the first choice for the code "Venham mais 5" (Let 5 more come). Other artists also used some craft to hide their meanings in the song or went into exile. One example is Adriano Correia de Oliveira that masked the explicit lyrics with the vocal tone making it difficult to distinguish the critical verse, from the refrain or even other verses. In no other song is this more noted that the ballad "Trova do Vento que Passa" (Song/Poem of the Passing Wind), whose lyrics by the writer Manuel Alegre were a direct criticism of the state. The music was by António Portugal but Correia used a typical Fado rhythm to hide such provocative verses as "Mesmo na noite mais triste/em tempo de sevidão/há sempre alguém que resiste/há sempre alguém que diz não" (even in the saddest night/in time of servitude/there is always someone who stands up/there is always someone who says No).

Not only men but also women had an active participation, albeit in lesser numbers. Ermelinda Duarte, one of those women, wrote the song "Somos Livres" (We Are Free), for a 1972 theatre play called Lisboa 72, masking a deep meaning with catchy children's music. Although the version of her singing the tune is the best known it was only recorded after the carnation revolution.

Many other songwriters and singers, to generate awareness, used their talents to act in all of Portugal, sometimes without pay or transport. Fausto Bordalo Dias once sang into a mike so poorly made it needed a plastic cup to work. Other singers included the priest Francisco Fanhais, the writer José Jorge Letria; Fernando Tordo; Luís Cília; Amélia Muge; Janita Salomé; Manuel Freire; José Barata-Moura; the poet Ary dos Santos; José Mário Branco, Sérgio Godinho, Carlos Alberto Moniz, Maria do Amparo and Samuel.

=== Poland ===
Protest songs in Poland were mostly associated with anti-communist movement and developed in the 1970s and 1980s. One of the most important artists was Jacek Kaczmarski, author of such famous songs as "Mury" ("The Walls"), "Przedszkole" ("The Kindergarten") and "Zbroja" ("The Armor"), criticizing both the totalitarian communist government and the opposition. Another famous Polish folk singer, Jan Pietrzak, wrote one of the best-known Polish patriotic protest songs, "Żeby Polska była Polską" ("Make Poland Polish"), in which he reminded the most heroic moments of Polish history, including Kościuszko Uprising, and called people to fight the communists as they fought other enemies of Poland before. He also recorded a musical version of the Jonasz Kofta's poem "Pamiętajcie o ogrodach" ("Remember the Gardens"), protesting against the industrialism of life promoted by the communist propaganda. Other Polish artists well known for writing protest songs include Kazimierz Staszewski and Przemysław Gintrowski.

As Rhythms of Resistance groups operated in many cities during the 2000s, rhythm predominated protests, and protesters tended not to sing. As Poland moved closer to authoritarian rule, protest song writing and performance became a staple of social movements, and singing was incorporated into street demonstrations. The song's melodies, lyrics, and performance style all alluded to earlier social struggles and political traditions that the protest was referencing and strove to uphold.

In the second decade of the 21st century, urban movements established choirs of activists, i.e. the Warsaw Revolutionary Choir "Warszawianka", the Krakow Revolutionary Choir, the TAK [Tricity Women's Action] Choir in Gdańsk, which supported street protests. The song repertoire consisted largely of reconstructions of protest songs from the late 19th and early 20th centuries. In Łódź, "Warszawianka" was sung en masse during the celebrations marking the 110th and 111th anniversaries of the insurrection of 1905.

In 2016, singing workshops for women were conducted during some Black Protest demonstrations. The protest song "Wściekły szpaler" on YouTube with the participation of activists showed how important they find this method of communication.

As a tribute to Piotr Szczęsny, who used public self-immolation to condemn "the ruling party for the systematic violation of the law, inspiring discrimination against minorities, and deliberately destroying the country's nature and educational system," protest songs were written in 2017. In order to convince Andrzej Duda to oppose constitutional amendments, activists later that year performed a modified rendition on YouTube of the Christmas carol "Przybieżeli do Betlejem" in the places the Polish president visited.

Many protest songs were performed in Poland in 2019 during the largest teachers' strike in the country's history. Many schools, even in small towns or villages produced protest songs. Recordings of group performances were posted on social media. Numerous songs were based on tunes from the 1980s of the 20th century, specifically from the time of martial law that put an end to the 'carnival of solidarity' in 1980–1981.

Many protest songs were played during the Women's Strike demonstrations in 2020 and 2021. One was "Tortury ciało" on YouTube to the tune of "Bella ciao". This song became a symbol of the demonstrations against the government and the Catholic church as they both tried to increase restrictions on the right to abortion.

=== Russia ===
The most famous source of Russian protest music in the 20th century has been those known locally as bards. The term (бард in Russian) came to be used in the Soviet Union in the early 1960s, and continues to be used in Russia today, to refer to singer-songwriters who wrote songs outside the Soviet establishment. Many of the most famous bards wrote numerous songs about war, particularly The Great Patriotic War (World War II). Bards had various reasons for writing and singing songs about war. Bulat Okudzhava, who actually fought in the war, used his sad and emotional style to illustrate the futility of war in songs such as "The Paper Soldier" ("Бумажный Солдат").

Many political songs were written by bards under Soviet rule, and the genre varied from acutely political, "anti-Soviet" songs, to witty satire in the best traditions of Aesop. Some of Bulat Okudzhava's songs provide examples of political songs written on these themes. Vladimir Vysotsky was perceived as a political songwriter, but later he gradually made his way into more mainstream culture. It was not so with Alexander Galich, who was forced to emigrate—owning a tape with his songs could mean a prison term in the USSR. Before emigration, he suffered from KGB persecution, as did another bard, Yuliy Kim. Others, like Evgeny Kliachkin and Aleksander Dolsky, maintained a balance between outright anti-Soviet and plain romantic material. Protest rhetoric can also be traced in the works of such rock bands as Grazhdanskaya Oborona, Naive, Tarakany!, Pilot, Noize MC, Lumen and Louna. Later, during the Soviet-Afghan War in the 1980s, Kino (band) released an album, Gruppa krovi, which its main song, "Blood Type" (Группа Крови) is a protest song about the Soviet-Afghan War. In Grand Theft Auto IV, it was part of the soundtrack before its ten-year license expired in 2018. In 2019, twenty-nine years and a day after the group's last performance at Luzhniki Stadium, Metallica held a concert there and sang "Blood Type".

In the 21st century, the feminist punk band Pussy Riot in particular has had frequent run-ins with the Putin presidency and the Russian Orthodox Church.

=== Spain ===
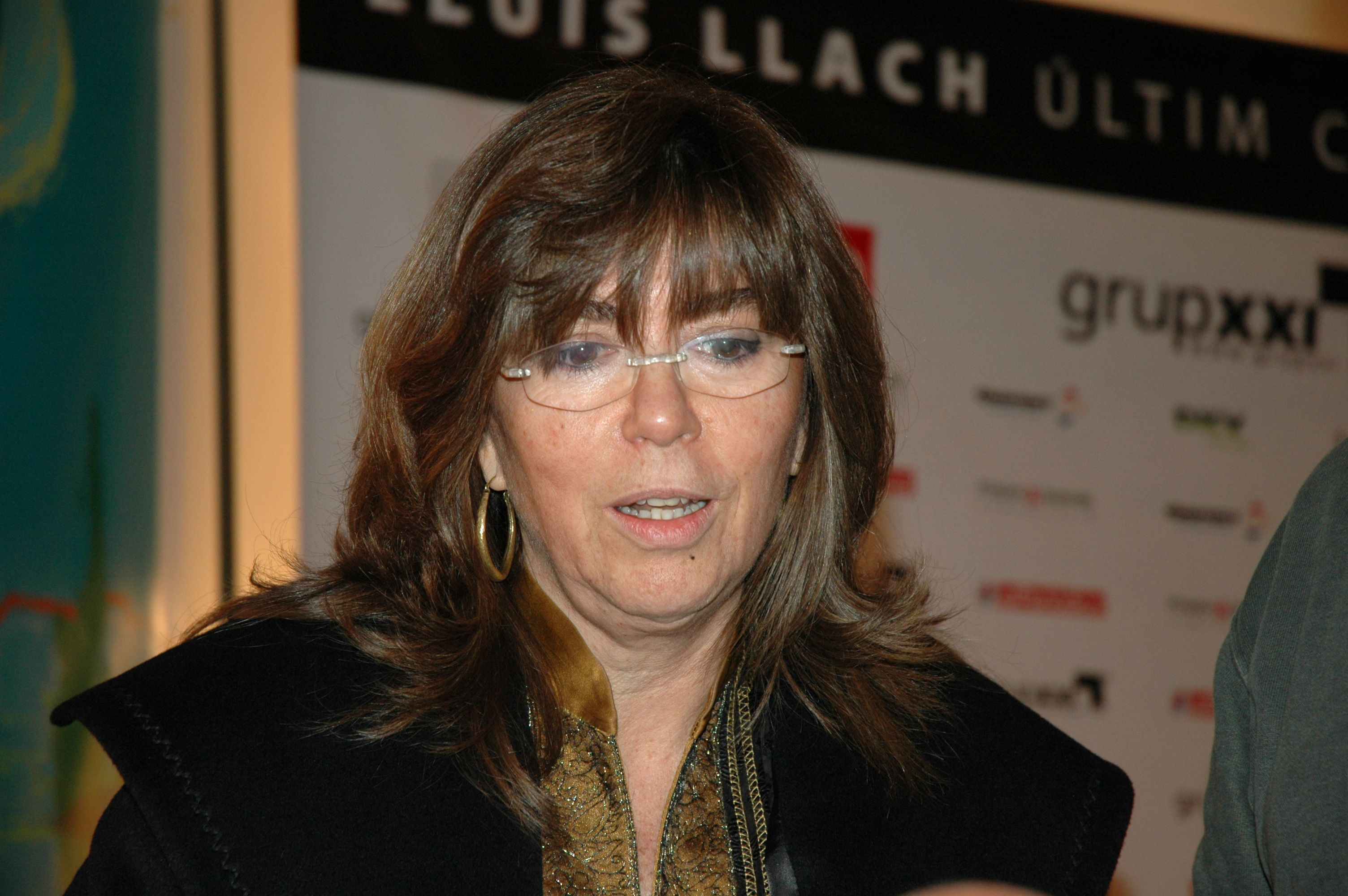
Maria del Mar Bonet is known for her song "Què volen aquesta gent?", an anthem of resistance against Franco's dictatorship.

Spain saw a brief period of protest singers in the 1970s, in the final years of Franco's dictatorship, mainly challenging the regime's censorship. They include some mainstream Spanish artists of the era, as Joan Manuel Serrat and Víctor Manuel, but also many others as José Antonio Labordeta, Raimon, Luis Eduardo Aute, Rosa León or Lluís Llach. The Catalan language, then a non-official language in the country, was often used as a vehicle of protest in itself, to highlight the cultural discrimination towards non-Castilian Spanish native speakers in Spain.

Most of the protest songs were in a folk style with social themes, and were popular among the (then banned) left-wing and their supporters, as well with many young students in main universities. Some notable songs were Al Alba ("At Dawn") by Aute, Al vent ("To The Wind") by Raimon, and L'Estaca ("The Stake") by Llach.

The movement come to an end after the Spanish transition to democracy, years after Franco's death. In 1997, singer Ismael Serrano briefly revamped the style, being his song Papá cuéntame otra vez ("Dad, tell me again") a nostalgic hymn to the 1970s protests.

=== United Kingdom ===
==== 14th–19th century ====
English folk songs from the late medieval and early modern period reflect the social upheavals of their day. In 1944 the Marxist scholar A. L. Lloyd claimed that "The Cutty Wren" song constituted a coded anthem against feudal oppression and actually dated back to the English peasants' revolt of 1381, making it the oldest extant European protest song. He offered no evidence for his assertion, however and no trace of the song has been found before the 18th century. Despite Lloyd's dubious claim about its origins, however, the "Cutty Wren" was revived and used as a protest song in the 1950s folk revival, an example of what may be considered a protest song. In contrast, the rhyme, "When Adam delved and Eve span, who was then the gentleman?", is attested as authentically originating in the 1381 Peasant Revolt, though no tune associated with it has survived. Ballads celebrating social bandits like Robin Hood, from the 14th century onwards, can be seen as expressions of a desire for social justice, though although social criticism is implied and there is no overt questioning of the status quo.

The era of civil and religious wars of the 17th century in Britain gave rise to the radical communistic millenarian Levellers and Diggers' movements and their associated ballads and hymns, as, for example, the "Diggers' Song". with the incendiary verse:

But the Gentry must come down,
and the poor shall wear the crown.
Stand up now, Diggers all!

The Digger movement was violently crushed, and so it is not surprising if few overt protest songs associated with it have survived. From roughly the same period, however, songs protesting wars and the human suffering they inflict abound, though such songs do not generally explicitly condemn the wars or the leaders who wage them. For example, "The Maunding Souldier" or "The Fruits of Warre is Beggery", framed as a begging appeal from a crippled soldier of the Thirty Years' War. Such songs have been known, strictly speaking, as songs of complaint rather than of protest, since they offered no solution or hint of rebellion against the status quo.

The advent of industrialization in the 18th and early 19th centuries was accompanied by a series of protest movements and a corresponding increase in the number of topical social protest songs and ballads. An important example is "The Triumph of General Ludd", which built a fictional persona for the alleged leader of the early 19th century anti-technological Luddite movement in the cloth industry of the north midlands, and which made explicit reference to the Robin Hood tradition. A surprising English folk hero immortalized in song is Napoleon Bonaparte, the military figure most often the subject of popular ballads, many of them treating him as the champion of the common working man in songs such as the "Bonny Bunch of Roses" and "Napoleon's Dream". As labour became more organized songs were used as anthems and propaganda, for miners with songs such as "The Black Leg Miner", and for factory workers with songs such as "The Factory Bell".

These industrial protest songs were largely ignored during the first English folk revival of the later 19th and early 20th century, which had focused on songs that had been collected in rural areas where they were still being sung and on music education. They were revived in the 1960s and performed by figures such as A. L. Lloyd on his album The Iron Muse (1963). In the 1980s the anarchist rock band Chumbawamba recorded several versions of traditional English protest songs as English Rebel Songs 1381–1914.

==== 20th century ====
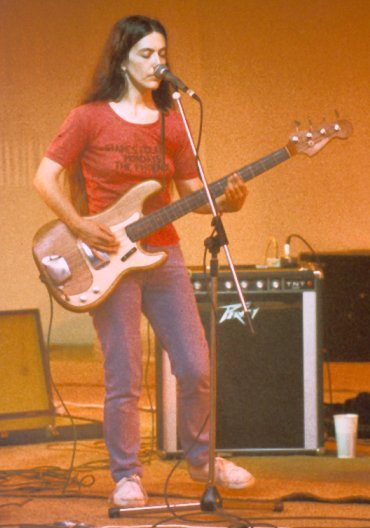
Maggie Holland, known for "A Place Called England"

Colin Irwin, a journalist for The Guardian, believes the modern British protest movement started in 1958 when the Campaign for Nuclear Disarmament organized a 53-mile march from Trafalgar Square to Aldermaston, to protest Britain's participation in the arms race and recent testing of the H-bomb. The protest "fired up young musicians to write campaigning new songs to argue the case against the bomb and whip up support along the way. Suddenly many of those in skiffle groups playing American songs were changing course and writing fierce topical songs to back direct action." A song composed for the march, "The H-Bomb's Thunder", set the words of a poem by novelist John Brunner to the tune of "Miner's Lifeguard":

Men and women, stand together
Do not heed the men of war
Make your minds up now or never
Ban the bomb for evermore.

Folk singer Ewan MacColl was for some time one of the principal musical figures of the British nuclear disarmament movement. A former agitprop actor and playwright. MacColl, a prolific songwriter and committed leftist, some years earlier had penned "The Ballad of Ho Chi Minh" (1953), issued as single on Topic Records, and "The Ballad of Stalin" (1954), commemorating the death of that leader. Neither record has ever been reissued.

According to Irwin, MacColl, when interviewed in the Daily Worker in 1958, declared that:

There are now more new songs being written than at any other time in the past eighty years—young people are finding out for themselves that folk songs are tailor-made for expressing their thoughts and comments on contemporary topics, dreams, and worries,

In 1965, folk-rock singer Donovan's cover of Buffy Sainte-Marie's "Universal Soldier" was a hit on the charts. His anti-Vietnam War song "The War Drags On" appeared that same year. This was a common trend in popular music of the 1960s and 1970s. The romantic lyrics of pop songs in the 1950s gave way to words of protest.

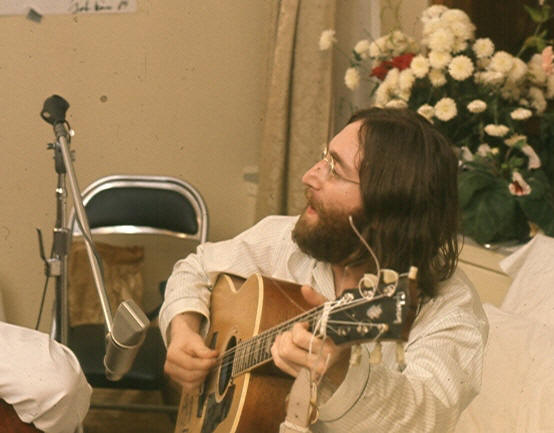
John Lennon rehearsing the anti–Vietnam War anthem "Give Peace a Chance" (1969)

As their fame and prestige increased in the late 1960s, The Beatles—and John Lennon in particular—added their voices to the anti-war movement. In the documentary The US Versus John Lennon, Tariq Ali attributes the Beatles' activism to the fact that, in his opinion, "The whole culture had been radicalized: [Lennon] was engaged with the world, and the world was changing him." "Revolution", 1968, commemorated the worldwide student uprisings. In 1969, when Lennon and Yoko Ono were married, they staged a week-long "bed-in for peace" in the Amsterdam Hilton, attracting worldwide media coverage. At the second "Bed-in" in Montreal, in June 1969, they recorded "Give Peace a Chance" in their hotel room. The song was sung by over half a million demonstrators in Washington, DC, at the second Vietnam Moratorium Day, on October 15, 1969. In 1972 Lennon's most controversial protest song LP was released, Some Time in New York City, the title of whose lead single "Woman Is the Nigger of the World", a phrase coined by Ono in the late 1960s to protest sexism, set off a storm of controversy, and in consequence received little airplay and much banning. The Lennons went to great lengths (including a press conference attended by staff from Jet and Ebony magazines) to explain that they had used the word nigger in a symbolic sense and not as an affront to African Americans. The album also included "Attica State", about the Attica Prison riots of September 9, 1971; "Sunday Bloody Sunday" and "The Luck Of The Irish", about the massacre of demonstrators in Northern Ireland and "Angela", in support of black activist Angela Davis. Lennon also performed at the "Free John Sinclair" benefit concert in Ann Arbor, Michigan, on December 10, 1971, on behalf of the imprisoned antiwar activist and poet who was serving 10 years in state prison for selling two joints of marijuana to an undercover cop. On this occasion Lennon and Ono appeared on stage with among others singers Phil Ochs and Stevie Wonder, plus antiwar activists Jerry Rubin and Bobby Seale of the Black Panthers party. Lennon's song "John Sinclair" (which can be heard on his Some Time in New York City album), calls on the authorities to "Let him be, set him free, let him be like you and me". The benefit was attended by some 20,000 people, and three days later the State of Michigan released Sinclair from prison.

The 1970s saw a number of notable songs by British acts that protested against war, including "Peace Train" by Cat Stevens (1971), and "War Pigs" by Black Sabbath (1970). Sabbath also protested environmental destruction, describing people leaving a ruined Earth ("Into the Void" including, "Iron Man"). Renaissance added political repression as a protest theme with "Mother Russia" being based on One Day in the Life of Ivan Denisovich and being joined on the second side of their 1974 album Turn of the Cards by two other protest songs in "Cold Is Being" (about ecological destruction) and "Black Flame" (about the Vietnam War).

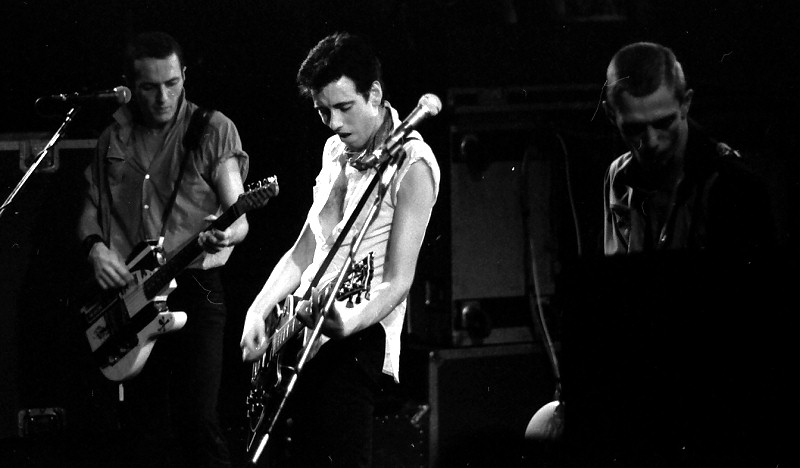
The Clash, one of the pioneers of the punk movement, who protested class economics, race issues, and authoritarianism

As the 1970s progressed, the louder, more aggressive punk movement became the strongest voice of protest, particularly in the UK, featuring anti-war, anti-state, and anti-capitalist themes. The punk culture, in stark contrast with the 1960s' sense of power through union, concerned itself with individual freedom, often incorporating concepts of individualism, free thought and even anarchism. According to Search and Destroy founder V. Vale, "Punk was a total cultural revolt. It was a hardcore confrontation with the black side of history and culture, right-wing imagery, sexual taboos, a delving into it that had never been done before by any generation in such a thorough way." The most significant protest songs of the movement included "God Save the Queen" (1977) by the Sex Pistols, "If the Kids are United" by Sham 69, "Career Opportunities" (1977) (protesting the political and economic situation in England at the time, especially the lack of jobs available to the youth), and "White Riot" (1977) (about class economics and race issues) by The Clash, and "Right to Work" by Chelsea. See also Punk ideology.

War was still the prevalent theme of British protest songs of the 1980s – such as Kate Bush's "Army Dreamers" (1980), which deals with the traumas of a mother whose son dies while away at war. Indeed, the early 1980s was a remarkable period for anti-nuclear and anti-war UK political pop, much of it inspired directly or indirectly by the punk movement: 1980 saw '22 such Top 75 hits, by 18 different artists. For almost th[at] entire year ... (47 weeks), the UK singles charts contained at least one hit song that spoke of antiwar or antinuclear concerns, and usually more than one.' Further George McKay argues that 'it really is quite extraordinary to note that one-third of the year 1984 (17 weeks) had some kind of political pop song at the top of the British charts. Viewed from that lofty perspective, 1984 must be seen as a peak protest music time in Britain, most of it in the context of antiwar and antinuclear sentiment.'

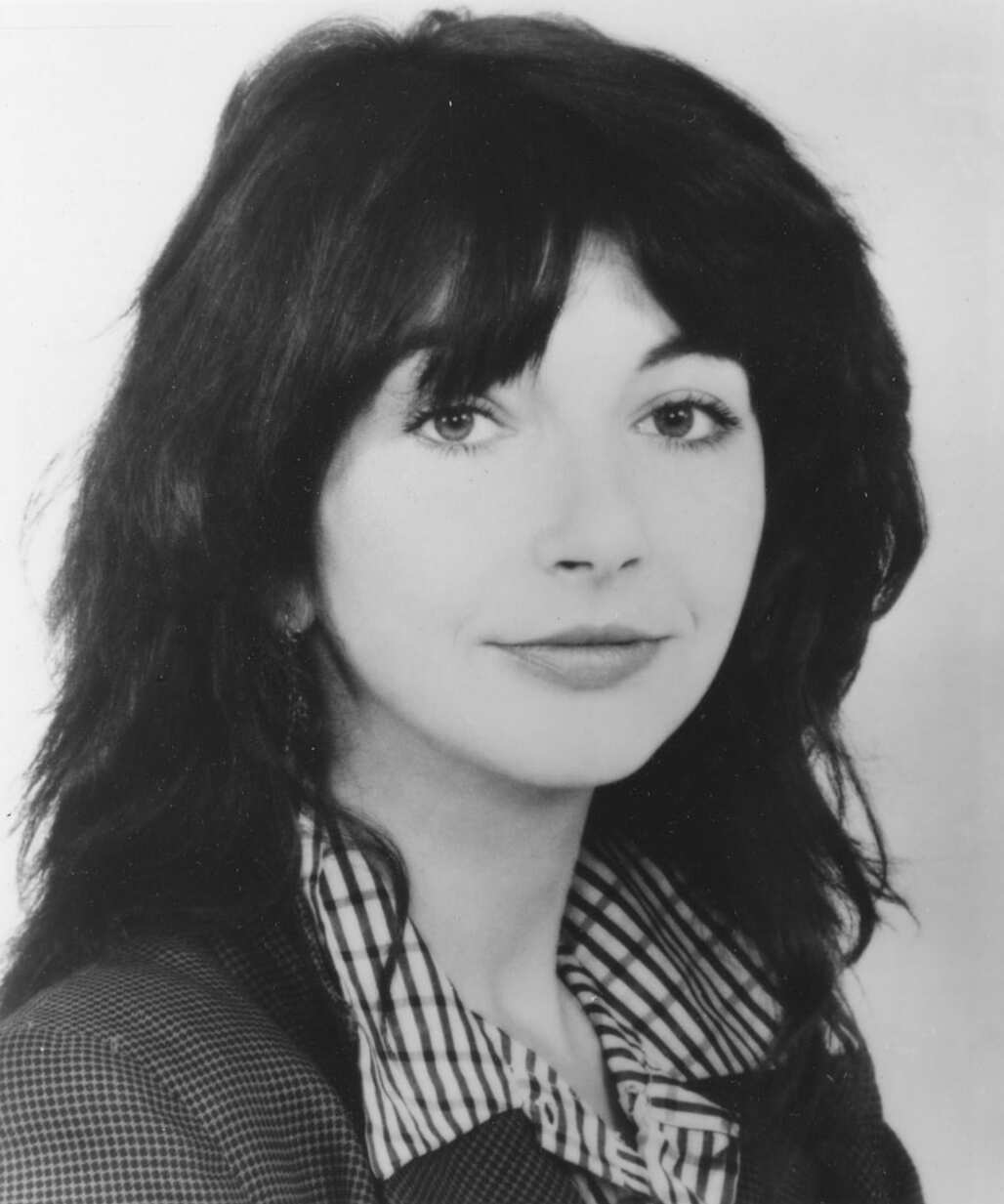
Kate Bush with her poignant anti-war song "Army Dreamers" (1980) capturing the emotional toll of war

However, as the 1980s progressed, it was British prime minister Margaret Thatcher who came under the greatest degree of criticism from native protest singers, mostly for her strong stance against trade unions, and especially for her handling of the UK miners' strike (1984–1985), the subject of Sting's "We Work the Black Seam". The leading voice of protest in Thatcherite Britain in the 1980s was Billy Bragg, whose style of protest song and grass-roots political activism was mostly reminiscent of those of Woody Guthrie, however with themes that were relevant to the contemporary Briton. He summarized his stance in "Between the Wars" (1985), in which he sings: "I'll give my consent to any government that does not deny a man a living wage."

Also in the 1980s, the band Frankie Goes to Hollywood released a political pop protest song named Two Tribes, a relentless bass-driven track depicting the futility and starkness of nuclear weapons and the Cold War. The video for the song depicted a wrestling match between then-President Ronald Reagan and then-Soviet leader Konstantin Chernenko for the benefit of group members and an eagerly belligerent assembly of representatives from the world's nations, the event ultimately degenerating into complete global destruction. This video was played several times at the 1984 Democratic National Convention. Due to some violent scenes ("Reagan" biting "Chernenko"'s ear, etc.), the unedited video could not be shown on MTV, and an edited version was substituted. The single quickly hit the number one spot in the United Kingdom. Several mixes of the track feature actor Patrick Allen, who recreated his narration from the Protect and Survive public information films for certain 12-inch mixes (the original Protect and Survive soundtracks were sampled for the 7-inch mixes).

== North America ==
=== Cuba ===
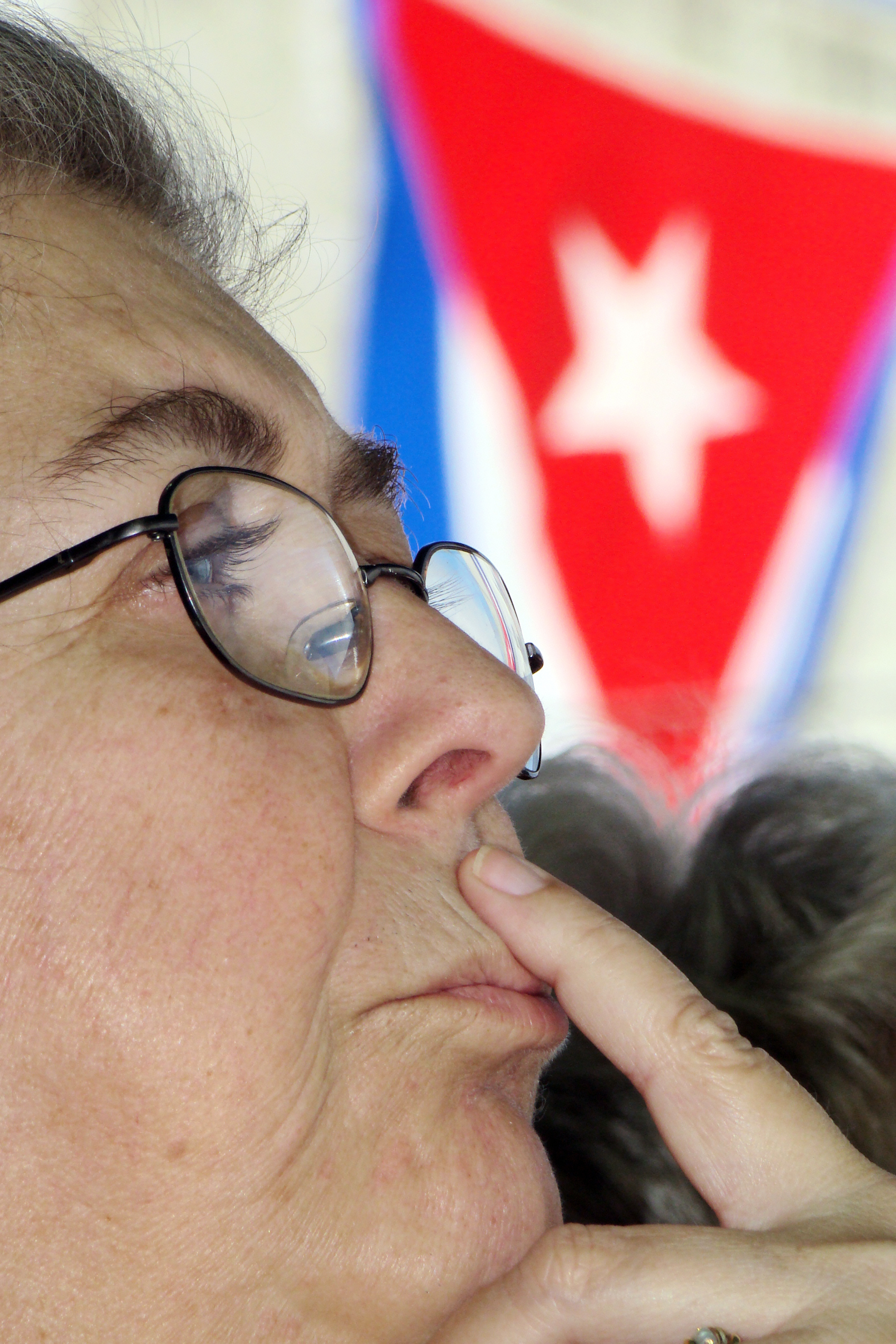
Sara González is one of the most iconic female figures in the Nueva Trova movement.

A type of Cuban protest music started in the mid-1960s when a movement in Cuban music emerged that combined traditional folk music idioms with progressive and often politicized lyrics. This movement of protest music came to be known as "Nueva trova", and was somewhat similar to that of Nueva canción, however with the advantage of support from the Cuban government, as it promoted the Cuban Revolution – and thus part of revolutionary song.

=== Puerto Rico ===
Though originally and still largely Cuban, nueva trova has become popular across Latin America, especially in Puerto Rico. The movements biggest stars included Puerto Ricans such as Roy Brown, Andrés Jiménez, Antonio Cabán Vale and the group Haciendo Punto en Otro Son.

In response to Telegramgate, Puerto Rican musicians Bad Bunny, Residente, and iLE released the protest song "Afilando los cuchillos" on July 17, 2019. It is a diss track calling for the resignation of Ricardo Rosselló.

== Oceania ==
=== Australia ===
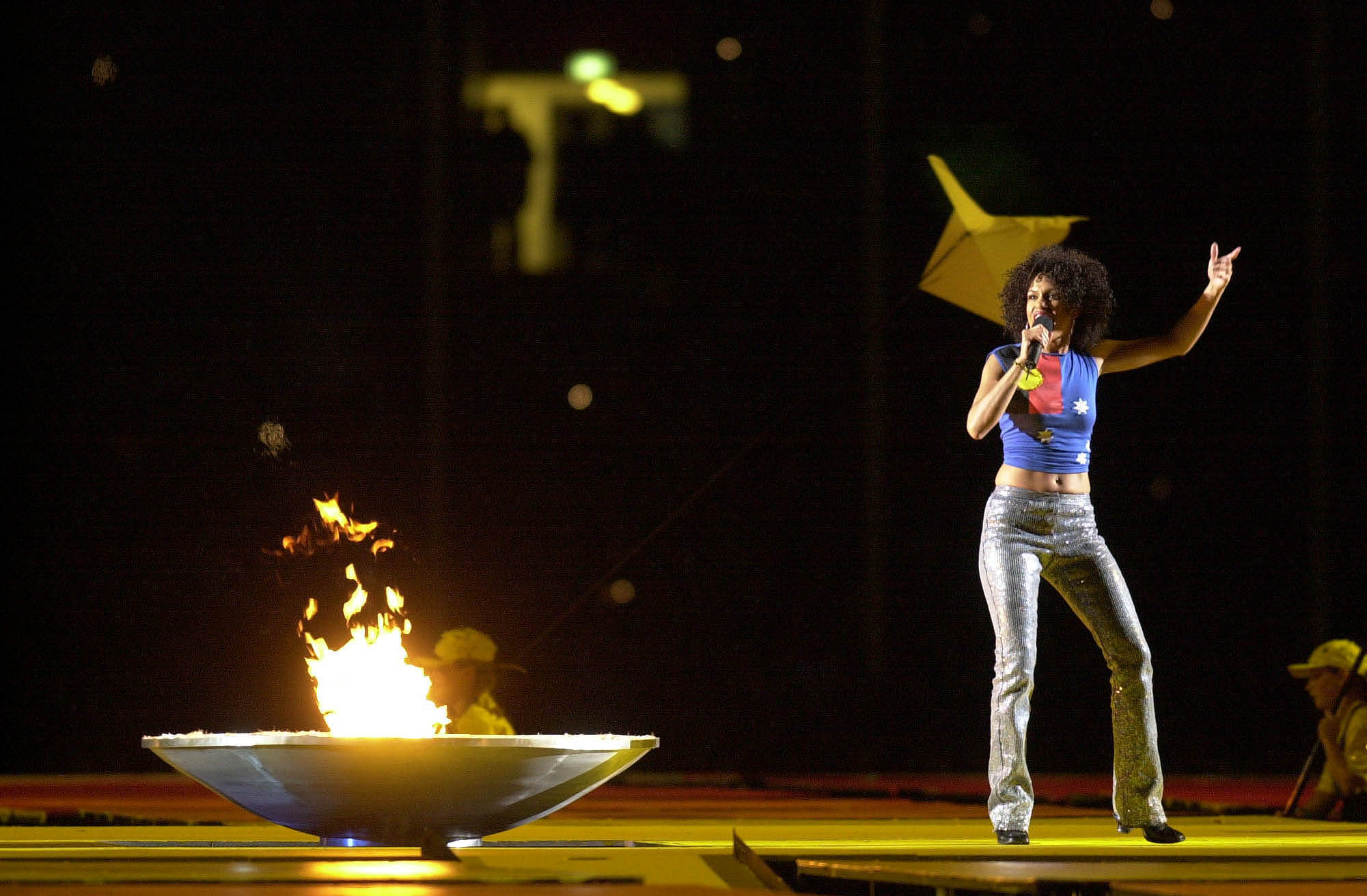
Christine Anu is one of Australia's most celebrated Indigenous artists, and her music often addresses the experiences and struggles of Indigenous Australians.

Indigenous issues feature prominently in politically inspired Australian music and include the topics of land rights and aboriginal deaths in custody. One of the most prominent Australian bands to confront these issues is Yothu Yindi. Other Australian bands to have confronted indigenous issues include Tiddas, Kev Carmody, Archie Roach, Christine Anu, The Herd, Neil Murray, Blue King Brown, the John Butler Trio, Midnight Oil, Warumpi Band, Paul Kelly, Powderfinger and Xavier Rudd.

In addition to Indigenous issues, many Australian protest singers have sung about the futility of war. Notable anti-war songs include "And The Band Played Waltzing Matilda" (1972) by Eric Bogle, and "A Walk in the Light Green" (1983) by Redgum, most often remembered by its chorus "I was only nineteen".

Many songs have also been composed about environmental issues, protests and campaigns. These include "Rip Rip Woodchip" (1989) by John Williamson, and "Let the Franklin Flow" (1983) by Goanna. Numerous songs were written and performed by protesters during anti-logging blockades in northern New South Wales, including "Behind Enemy Lines", "Tonka Toys" and "Hey Terania".

=== New Zealand ===
One of the earliest protest songs in New Zealand was John Hanlon's Damn the Dam, recorded in 1973 in support of the Save Manapouri Campaign.

During the bitterly divisive 1981 Springbok Tour, Blam Blam Blam's There Is No Depression in New Zealand became a favourite among anti-tour protesters. Reggae band Herbs wrote and performed songs criticising French nuclear testing in the Pacific Ocean.

== South America ==
=== Argentina ===
Notable protest songs in Argentina include León Gieco's Sólo Le Pido A Dios, targeting the Argentinian dictatorship and the Dirty War and Como la Cigarra by Mercedess Sosa.

=== Chile ===
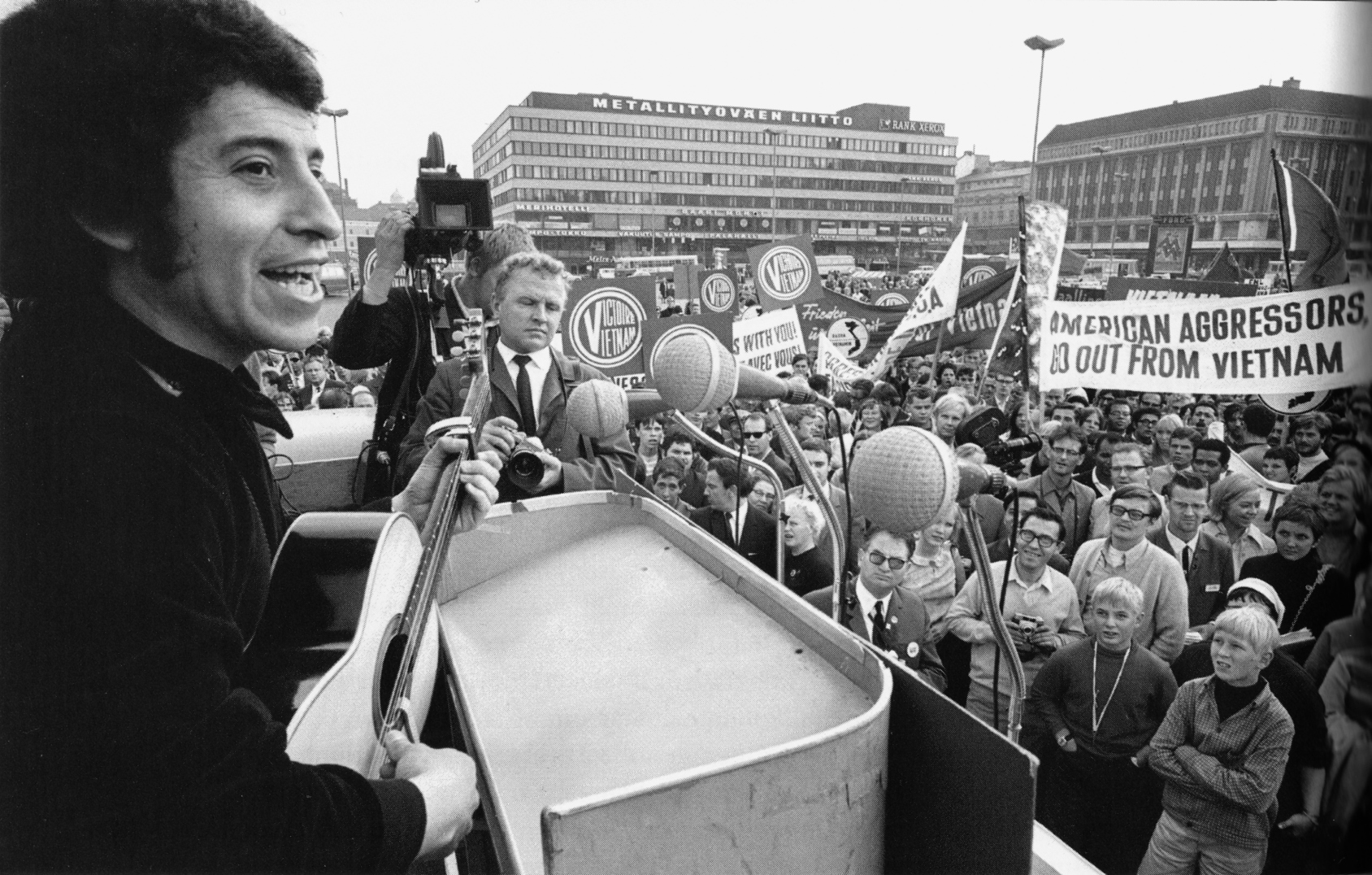
Víctor Jara in Helsinki

While the protest song was enjoying its Golden Age in America in the 1960s, it also saw many detractors overseas who saw it as having been commercialized. Chilean singer-songwriter Víctor Jara, who played a pivotal role in the folkloric renaissance that led to the Nueva Canción Chilena (New Chilean Song) movement, which created a revolution in the popular music of his country, criticized the "commercialized" American protest song phenomenon that had been imported into Chile. He criticized it thus:

The cultural invasion is like a leafy tree which prevents us from seeing our own sun, sky and stars. Therefore in order to be able to see the sky above our heads, our task is to cut this tree off at the roots. US imperialism understands very well the magic of communication through music and persists in filling our young people with all sorts of commercial tripe. With professional expertise they have taken certain measures: first, the commercialization of the so-called 'protest music'; second, the creation of 'idols' of protest music who obey the same rules and suffer from the same constraints as the other idols of the consumer music industry – they last a little while and then disappear. Meanwhile, they are useful in neutralizing the innate spirit of rebellion of young people. The term 'protest song' is no longer valid because it is ambiguous and has been misused. I prefer the term 'revolutionary song'.

Nueva canción (literally "new song" in Spanish) was a type of protest/social song in Latin American music which took root in South America, especially Chile and other Andean countries, and gained extreme popularity throughout Latin America. It combined traditional Latin American folk music idioms (played on the quena, zampoña, charango or cajón with guitar accompaniment) with some popular (esp. British) rock music, and was characterized by its progressive and often politicized lyrics. It is sometimes considered a precursor to rock en español. The lyrics are typically in Spanish, with some indigenous or local words mixed in.

In 2019, "A Rapist in Your Path" (Spanish: Un violador en tu camino) was first performed in Chile to protest rape culture and victim shaming. Videos of the song and its accompanying dance went viral, spreading across the world.

== See also ==
- Protest songs in the United States
- Civil Rights anthem
- Sentimental ballad
- Counterculture
- Counterculture of the 1960s
- Folk music
- Folk punk
- List of anti-war songs
- List of peace activists
- Music and politics
- Nonviolent resistance
- Political/Conscious hip hop
- Punk rock
- Lyrical themes of reggae
- Revolutionary song
- Topical song
- Wobblies
- Work song
