= Roosarito =

2023 single by Mehdi Yarrahi

Single
- Length: 3:57

Roosarito (Persian: روسریتو, lit. 'Your headscarf') is an Iranian Persian-language teen pop single track by Mehdi Yarrahi released in August 2023. September 16 is the anniversary of 2022 Iranian protests, last year Yarrahi had released another song the previous year Soroode Zan.

It was performed by Saeed Mohammadi before.

External videos
- https://ir.voanews.com/a/mehdi-yarahi-hijab-woman-life-freedom-music-/7241071.html

== Reactions ==
Yarrahi was not permitted from singing work since after 2018. The Iranian government arrested Yarrahi for anti hijab lyrics. PEN America condemned his arrest. His arrest was also condemned by Iranians widely regarded as government action against people. Various Iranian and Iranian diaspora artists and celebrities posted support Mohsen Chavoshi, Maziyar Lorestani(Shohre Lorestani). Days after her release Nazila Maroofian was arrested again a fourth time after supporting this song.

== See also ==
- Hijab in Iran
