= Soroode Zan =

2022 protest song by Mehdi Yarrahi

Song by Mehdi Yarrahi
- Language: Persian
- English title: "Woman's Anthem"
- Released: October 4, 2022
- Genre: Anthem
- Length: 2:00
- Composer: Mehdi Yarrahi
- Lyricist: Mona Borzouei

Mehdi Yarrahi singles chronology
"Cage is Enough" (2022)	"Soroode Zan" (2022)	"Life's Anthem" (2022)

Lyric video
- "Woman's Anthem" on YouTube

"Soroode Zan" (Persian: سرود زن, lit. 'Woman's Anthem') is a feminist anthem by Iranian singer and composer Mehdi Yarrahi. Composed by Yarrahi and written by Mona Borzouei, it is a protest song with musical composition of anthem style, released eighteen days after the Death of Mahsa Amini, inspired by her death and its aftermath. Beginning with the "Woman, Life, Freedom" slogan, in the lyrics, the narrators are calling everyone to join them in the Mahsa Amini protests. The song was used as a protest anthem in the demonstrations by the students of Tehran Art University.

== Background and release ==
=== Background ===
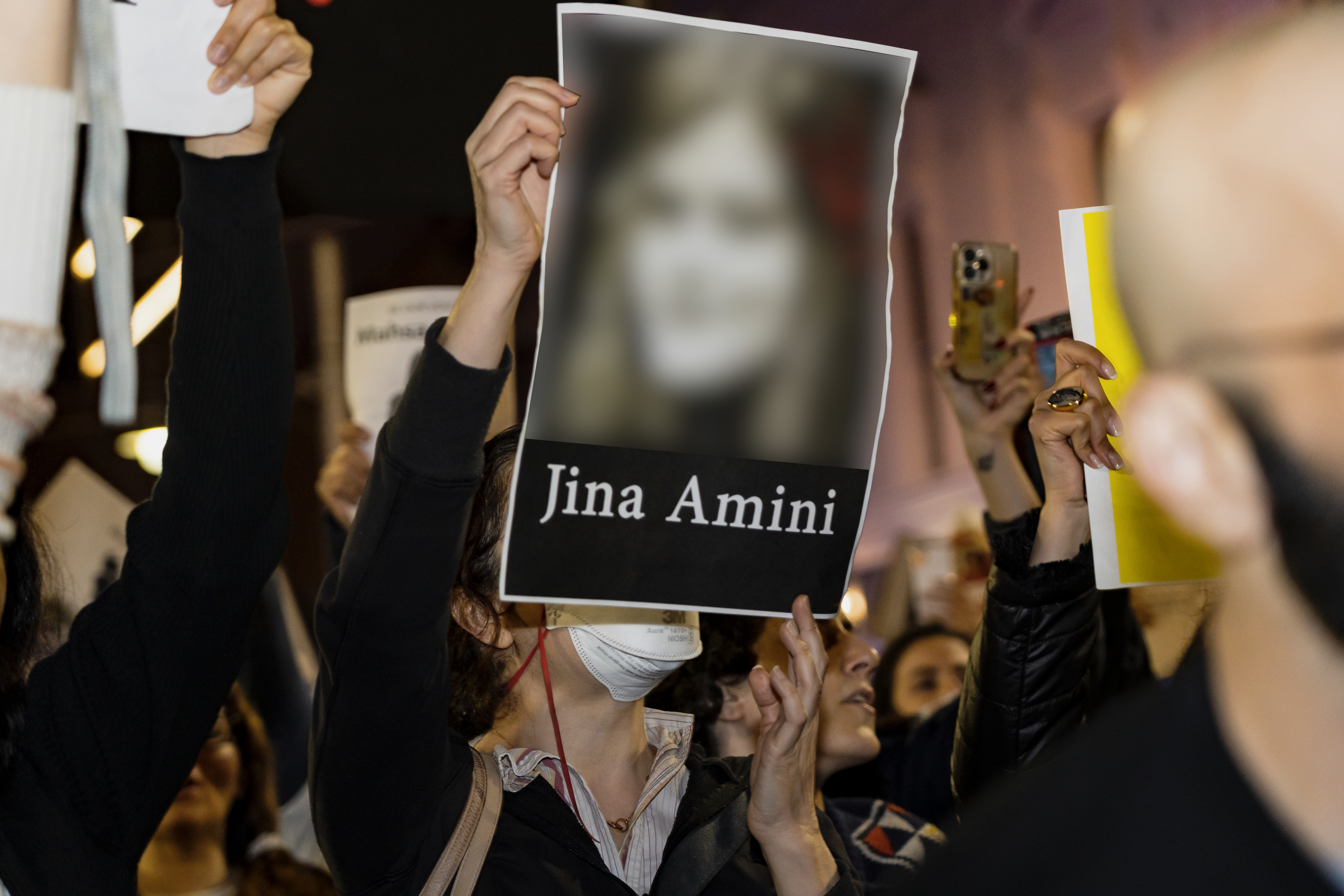
The Death of Mahsa Amini and its aftermath are the main inspiration of "Soroode Zan"

The song was inspired by the death of Mahsa Amini, who was arrested for alleged wearing her Hijab improperly and later died after according to eyewitnesses, she had been severely beaten by religious morality police officers. Amini's death sparked massive global protests and became a symbol for freedom in Iran. The "Woman, Life, Freedom" slogan —which the song starts with— became a rallying cry during the Mahsa Amini protests.

=== Release ===
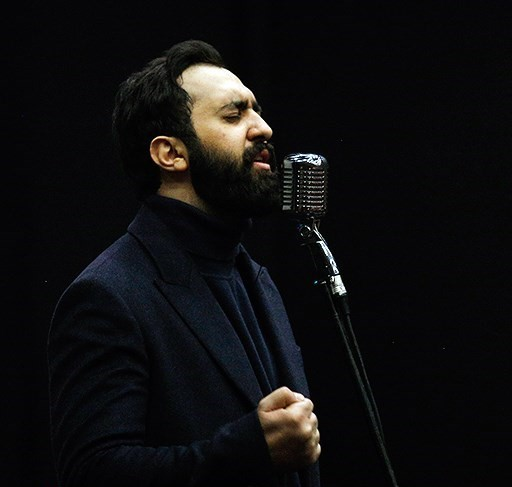
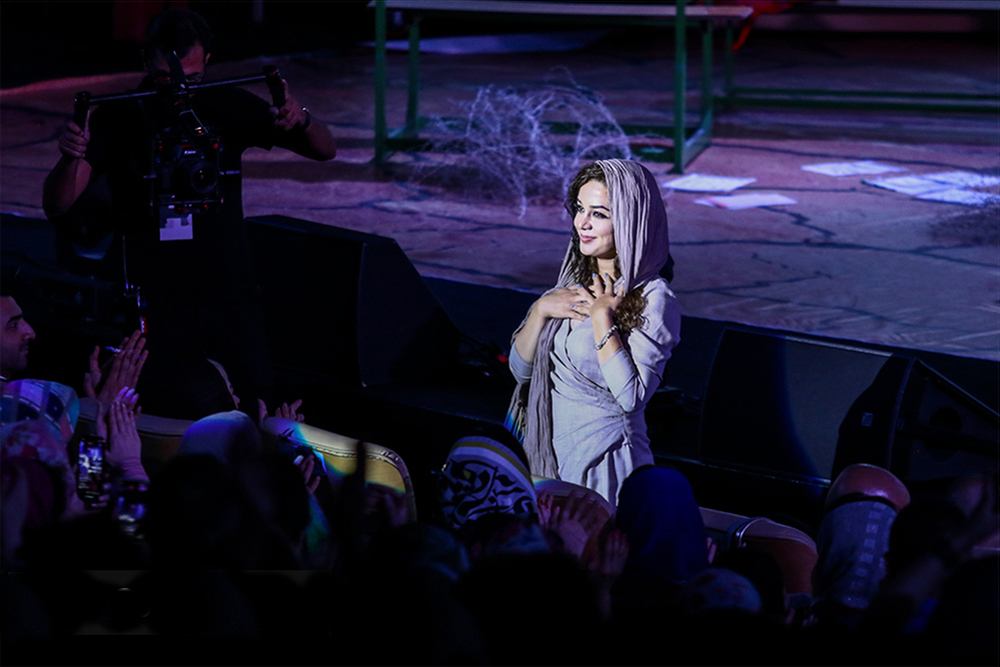
Mona Borzouei (on the right) is the lyricist and Mehdi Yarrahi (on the left) is the composer and performer of the song.

After the death of Mahsa Amini on September 16, 2022, and the start of the protests, many Iranian artists started releasing protest songs inspired by her death. Yarrahi released "Soroode Zan" on October 4, —eighteen days after the death of Mahsa Amini— through all of his platforms, without mentioning the name of the lyricist. Following Borzouei's arrest by the authorities on September 22, and her release on bail eight days later, she tweeted about her arrest. Yarrahi later retweeted Borzouei's tweet and thanked her for her work as the lyricist of the song.

== Composition and lyrics ==
=== Composition ===
"Soroode Zan" is written by Borzouei and composed by Yarrahi. It is a protest song with musical composition of anthem style.

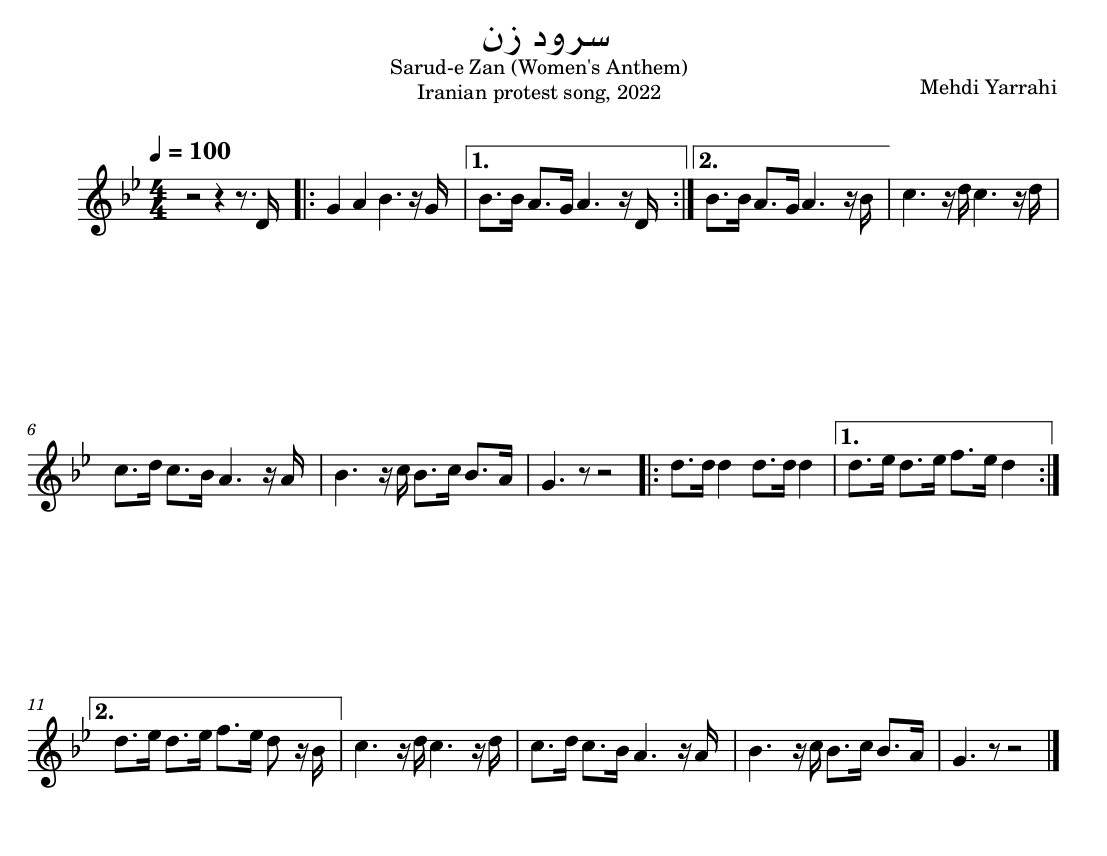
"Soroode Zan" transcription

=== Lyrics ===
The song first starts with a 12-second voice of Wolves howling and then it has two parts, an intro and a verse. The intro consist of six "Woman, Life Freedom" slogans, shouted by men and women. The women's voice are clearer, showing that they are leading the protests (referring to the Initial Mahsa Amini protests which mostly were led by women).

The second part is sung by Yarrahi, female and male guest choirs and some times, all together. The verse starts with the sentence "In the Name of You, That is our code word" that refers to the inscription on Amini's tombstone that later was used as a slogan in the protests:

Kurdish: ژینا گیان تۆ نامری. ناوت ئەبێتە ڕەمز
"Beloved Žina [Mahsa], you will not die. Your name will become a code."

In the second sentence, the song is making a reference to Neda Agha-Soltan, which after getting killed by Basij paramilitary forces for peacefully joining the protests in the 2009 Iranian election protests, she became a symbol for freedom in Iran. Nedā (ندا) means "voice" or "calling", the narrators in the song are calling everyone to join them in the Mahsa Amini protests.

In the verse the female guest choirs are addressing the men's role in the protests, who are like a "Trench warfare" for women and making a tribute to them. In return the male guest choirs and Yarrahi are saying "In-lieu-of them, beat my heart!", assuring the women of the men's role, to make them join the protests. The male guest choirs and Yarrahi also make a tribute to the women's bravery in the protests —which according to the statistics and the videos that went viral in the first days of the protests, the women were at the front line of the demonstrations— by saying "Hairs put up, What a tremendous sense of awe!", referring to the protester Hadis Najafi, which after she got killed —by reportedly getting shot at least six times in the face, hand, neck, abdomen and heart— a video purporting to show her tying her hair into a ponytail before joining the protests on her last night alive became viral on social media, making Najafi a symbol of repression in Iran.

By saying "Why immigrate? Stay and take back!", the narrators are criticizing the Human capital flight from Iran crisis, which due to the long history of Human rights violations by the Islamic Republic of Iran, Iran has the world's highest rate of brain drain, with every year more than 150,000 educated young people leaving the country.

== Commercial performance ==
As of March 20, 2025, the song has over 770,000 views on YouTube.

As of February 3, 2023, the song has about 792,000 streams on Spotify.

As of February 3, 2023, the song has about 259,000 streams on SoundCloud.

== Credits and personnel ==
Credits adapted from Yarrahi's Spotify account and his tweet thanking Borzouei for her work as the lyricist of the song.

Although, this song is credited to Mehdi Yarrahi as the composer but it is actually a cover of Sergio Ortega's protest song called "El pueblo unido jamás será vencido (The People United Will Never Be Defeated!)" with new Persian lyrics by Mona Borzouei, as it was credited.

- Mehdi Yarrahi – vocals, composer
- Mona Borzouei – lyricist

== See also ==
- For
- O Iran!
- Human rights in the Islamic Republic of Iran
