= Mona Borzouei =

Iranian musician

Mona Borzouee
- مونا برزویی
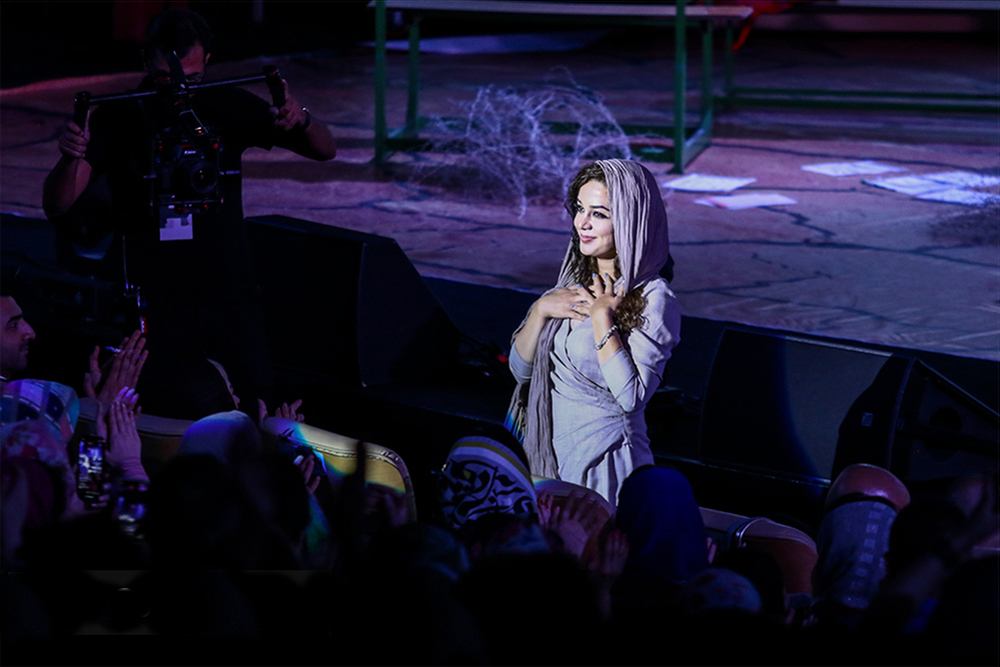
- Born: 9 May 1984 (age 42); Shiraz, Iran
- Occupations: Poet, songwriter
- Writing career
- Language: Persian
- Years active: 2003–present
- Website: borzouei.net

Signature
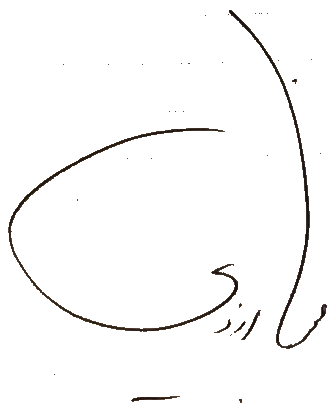

Mona Borzouee (Persian: مونا برزویی) is an Iranian poet and songwriter. Borzouee is known for writing Persian song lyrics for several well-known Iranian musicians. She was arrested in October 2022 during the Iranian protests following the death of Mahsa Amini.

== Background ==
Borzouee first gained recognition for writing the lyrics to Shadmehr Aghili's song, Ashk-e man (Persian: اشک من, lit. "my tear") in 2003. She has written song lyrics for many of Iran's most celebrated Persian-speaking musicians, including Aref, Googoosh, Ebi, Mehdi Yarrahi, Shadmehr Aghili, Majid Akhshabi, Ali Lohrasbi, and Ehsan Khajeh Amiri.

In 2013, she published a collection of her lyrics, titled Taghdir (Persian: تقدیر, lit. "destiny").

Allameh Tabataba'i University cancelled Borzouee's workshop on songwriting after Iran's state TV ran a disparaging news segment about her.

== Arrest ==
Security forces arrested Borzouee on 28 September 2022, during Mahsa Amini protests, for statements she had made on her twitter account.

== See also ==
- ‌Mahsa Amini protests
- Detainees of the September 2022 Iranian protests
- Human rights in Iran
