= Klopjag =

South African, Afrikaans folk-rock band

- Origin: Pretoria, South Africa
- Genres: Rock; jam band; folk rock; funk rock; indie rock; alternative rock
- Years active: 2002–present
- Labels: Hathor Records, Gresham Records
- Members: John-Henry Opperman; Marie-Louise Diedericks; Salmon de Jager; Dawie de Jager; Werner Griesel; Morné Bam
- Past members: Miles Mulder; Michelle Ohlhoff
- Website: http://www.klopjag.co.za

Klopjag is a South African, Afrikaans folk-rock band formed in Pretoria, Gauteng in 2002. The band's founding members were singer-songwriter and guitarist John-Henry Opperman, cellist Marie-Louise Diedericks, singer-songwriter and guitarist Salmon de Jager and singer-songwriter and guitarist Dawie de Jager. Drummer and percussionist, Werner Griesel joined the band in 2005 and Morné Bam joined the band as bassist in 2006.

== History ==
Klopjag played their first ever show together on 13 February 2002. Their debut album 13/02 was nominated for a "Geraas" Music Award in 2003, and Musiek vir die Agtergrond was nominated for a SAMA in 2009 while they were playing major festivals like Aardklop and KKNK. The group has always been well received by music critics for their folk-rock lyrical storytelling themes. Their music videos are widespread featured on South African music channels like DStv and MK89. They have made several appearances on tv shows and movies as a band or as band members.

== Band members ==
=== Current members ===
- John-Henry Opperman – lead vocals, backing vocals, rhythm guitar, acoustic guitar, electric guitar (2002–present)
- Marie-Louise Diedericks – lead vocals, backing vocals, cello, keyboard, violin (2002–present)
- Salmon de Jager – lead vocals, backing vocals, rhythm guitar, acoustic guitar, harmonica (2002–present)
- Dawie de Jager – lead vocals, backing vocals, rhythm guitar, acoustic guitar, electric guitar (2002–present)
- Werner Griesel – drums, percussion (2005–present)
- Morné Bam – bass (2006–present)

=== Former members ===
- Michelle Ohlhoff – bass, backing vocals, keyboard (2004–2006)
- Miles Mulder – drums, percussion (2004–2005)

== Discography ==
=== Studio albums ===
- 13/02 (2002)
- 15de Laan (2004)
- Album 3 (2005)
- 5 (2007)
- Musiek vir die Agtergrond (2008)

=== Live album ===
- 09 (2009)

=== Dvds ===
- Aardklop (2007)
- My Storie (2011)
