= Island's Sunrise =

2014 song by Fire EX

Song by Fire EX.
- Language: Taiwanese Hokkien
- Released: December 30, 2014.
- Genre: Hokkien pop
- Label: Sony Music Taiwan
- Songwriter: Sam Yang
- Producers: Wu Dar-Kuen, Chen Ching-Yuan

"Island's Sunrise" (Chinese: 島嶼天光) is a Taiwanese Hokkien song created by the punk rock band Fire EX. and the Taipei National University of the Arts for the Sunflower Student Movement in 2014.

The band permitted non-commercial use of both "Goodnight! Formosa!" and "Island's Sunrise" by supporters of the movement.

The song was officially banned in China. It was released as a single by Sony Music Entertainment in Taiwan on December 30, 2014 and won Best Song of the Year at the 26th Golden Melody Awards the following year.

== Background ==
I hope this song is not just one of my creations, this song is for everyone, it really belongs to everyone's song.

— Sam Yang 楊大正

On March 18, 2014 the Cross-Strait Service Trade Agreement (CSSTA) controversy led to the occupation of the Legislative Yuan by students and drew protestors to gather. On the first day, Fire EX. lead singer Sam Yang (楊大正), guitarist Jheng Yu Chen (鄭宇辰), and bassist JC (陳敬元) held a sit-in outside the Legislative Yuan. The band's song "Good night! Formosa!," from the album "A Man On The Sea,", was frequently performed at social protests. As the movement grew, a graduate of the university proposed that the band write a song for the movement.

== Usage ==
Videos of the student occupation of the Legislative Yuan amassed views quickly. The band granted fair use of "Island's Sunrise" and "Good night! Formosa!" to supporters of the Sunflower Student Movement.

During the 330 Anti-Trade Rally, in addition to the speeches delivered on stage, the crowd was also taught to sing "Island's Sunrise." At 7 p.m. Fire EX., who was set to be the finale of the event, led a massive gathering of 500,000 protesters on Ketagalan Boulevard, singing "Island's Sunrise" and "Goodnight! Formosa!". On the same day, during the support events held in Tokyo, Kyoto, Fukuoka, and New York, the crowd also sang "Island's Sunrise".

Wu Qingtan, the director of the First Taiwan Army Special Forces Rights Promotion Association, anticipated that the number of views would soon surpass one million and stated that the Taiwanese people were singing the song as a "symbol of resistance against the unforgivable". On March 31, "Island's Sunrise" and "Goodnight! Formosa!" by Fire EX. claimed the top two spots on the iTunes charts.

== Awards ==
"Island's Sunrise" was nominated for the "Best Song of the Year" category at the 26th Golden Melody Awards.
