= Mehdi Yarrahi =

Iranian singer

Mehdi Yarrahi مهدی یراحی
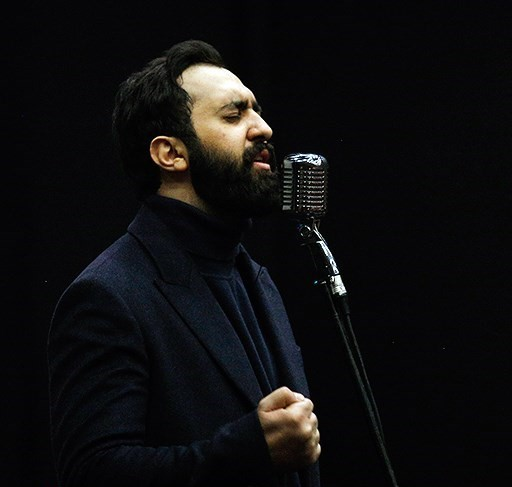

Background information
- Born: 14 November 1981 (age 45); Ahvaz, Iran
- Genre: Persian Pop
- Occupations: Singer; composer
- Instruments: Guitar, piano, keyboards
- Years active: 2000–present
- Website: mehdiyarrahi.com

Mehdi Yarrahi (Persian: مهدی یراحی, born 14 November 1981 in Ahvaz) is an Iranian singer, musician, and activist living in Tehran. He began his professional career in 2010. At times, he has been banned from performing in public by the Ministry of Culture and Islamic Guidance and the Islamic Republic of Iran Broadcasting due to the politically sensitive content of his songs and protests.

On 25 August 2023, Mehdi Yarrahi released his new protest song, Roosarito. The song supports women who, by joining the Woman, Life, Freedom movement, remove their headscarves in defiance of Iran's compulsory hijab laws. Following the release, Tehran's prosecutor ordered Yarrahi's arrest on charges related to the publication of Roosarito.

On 28 December 2024, after serving a one-year prison sentence, Mehdi Yarrahi was released. However, his sentence of 74 lashes remained in effect but was suspended on bail of 1.5 billion tomans and remained under review. In a video published on his personal YouTube channel on 28 February 2025, Yarrahi declared his readiness to receive the punishment, defended women's civil liberties in the arts, and criticized gender-based favoritism in Iran's music industry. On 5 March 2025, his sentence of 74 lashes was carried out.

== Music career ==
Yarrahi is known for his highly controversial works and is one of the very few artists who maintained a daringly close take on social developments within the Iranian community. In 2019 The Economist magazine reported the Iranian pop star challenges the regime with hit song criticizing Iran-Iraq war. In 2017 Mehdi Yarrahi won the award for best pop album from the Ministry of Culture and Islamic Guidance. But after the video of the anti-war song "Pare Sang" (Broken Stone) in 2019 the regime thinks Mr Yarrahi is singing out of tune. In the video the singer wears a Russian hat, English boots, an American overcoat adorned with military medals, an armband with a swastika on it and a [soldier's] plaque. Devastating images appear around him: a man seems to have set himself on fire, buildings collapse and families queue at a dry tap. "Don't know why I can't understand this, Why was there so much delay in ending the war?," Yarrahi sings in his video clip. "Another generation gone to the war, with no return." Etemad Daily reported that a few days after releasing the song, Yarrahi was banned from performing and publishing any of his works.

=== Azan (Call to Prayer) ===
In 2014, Mehdi Yarrahi performed and released the single Azan with his own distinctive style and melody, which is considered as one of his most visited and popular tracks in the world and many people describe it "the most beautiful call to prayer ever heard". The Azan often goes viral and internet users show interaction as well-known figures sharing and admiring the Azan. Raseef22 described it as "from Turkey to the America, he held the world enthralled by his melodious Azan while he is banned singing in his own country. Yes, we are talking about the Iranian artist and singer, Mehdi Yarrahi." Raseef22 reported in 2020 a clip of Turkish President Recep Tayyip Erdogan reshared widely on Turkish social media listening and enjoying this call to prayer. Mohamed Hadid praised this performance, writing in his Instagram page: "needs no explanation. A beautiful voice calling you to pray. Mehdi Yarrahi is the voice of an angel." Eric Abidal (a former Barcelona player and director), French Montana (Moroccan-American rapper), Sibel Can (Turkish singer), and Dida Diafat (a world champion in Muay Thai kickboxing) were some other well-known figures who attracted the attention of the internet users and media by posting Mehdi Yarrahi's Azan on their pages.

Raseef22 also mentioned the fact that Mehdi Yarrahi was banned from performing in his country due to his attitude and social activities, adding the Islamic Republic of Iran Broadcasting even avoided mentioning the name of the singer when broadcasting the news about the song Azan published by a famous football player in his page.

== Arrest ==
On 28 August 2023, Mehdi Yarrahi was arrested at his residence in Tehran following an order by the Tehran Prosecutor's Office after performing the song "Roosarito." His lawyer stated that three prior cases had already been filed against him, citing charges such as "propaganda against the system" and "collusion and assembly against national security" due to his protest songs in support of workers and popular protests.

=== 2023 arrest for singing Roosarito ===
In 2023 the Iranian justice system opened an investigation case against Yarrahi for publishing a single Roosarito song without permit with the song lyrics saying "lose your scarf, laugh and be happy and protest against crying tear". The justice system called it illegal and unethical. He was subsequently arrested. A photo was released from arrest. Farsnews published a piece that government must stop him and other celebrities promoting hijablessness. PEN America called it "a show of wild repression of freedom of expression".

=== Reactions to the Arrest ===
Mohsen Chavoshi defended Mehdi Yarrahi and condemned his arrest on his Instagram page. Kaveh Afagh also reacted to Yarrahi's arrest on his personal Instagram page. Following these reactions, the conservative newspaper Kayhan criticized Chavoshi for his stance.

Actress Taraneh Alidoosti reacted to Yarrahi's arrest by posting an Instagram story, stating: "Protest art is the right of an artist. Free Mehdi Yarrahi." Former captain of the Iranian national football team, Masoud Shojaei, also expressed his support for Yarrahi in an Instagram story.

A writer commented after Yarrahi's arrest, saying, "Mehdi Yarrahi is not only a patriot but also has deep love for his fellow Arab citizens. You know his birthplace is Khuzestan, the land of our Arab compatriots. Mehdi Yarrahi knows how to love both Iran as a whole and its diverse people."

Maziyar Lorestani wrote on Instagram that he had made a religious vow for Yarrahi's release.

=== Controversy Over the Release of Photos ===
The release of photos of Mehdi Yarrahi at the time of his arrest sparked criticism from lawyers and the public. A lawyer told Shargh Daily that the person responsible for publishing Yarrahi's photos was guilty under Article 91 of the Criminal Procedure Code for breaching professional confidentiality.

In response to the publication of these photos, Iran's judiciary issued a vague statement, without naming Yarrahi, acknowledging that images of detainees had been published in recent weeks without judicial authorization.

=== Yarrahi’s Response to Arresting Officers ===
During his detention, Yarrahi met with his lawyer and insisted on pursuing legal action against the officers who violated his rights during the arrest.

=== Release ===
On 17 October 2023, Zahra Minouei, Mehdi Yarrahi's lawyer, announced on social media that Yarrahi had been released on bail.

=== Sentencing ===
Yarrahi was sentenced by Branch 26 of the Revolutionary Court of Tehran to a total of "2 years and 8 months of imprisonment and 74 lashes." Under Article 134 of the Islamic Penal Code of Iran, only one year of imprisonment is enforceable.

== Social activism ==
- Yarrahi's presence in the fourth human chain supporting Karoon in 2013. After participating in this chain, which was accompanied by crowds and people's welcome for the singer's presence, he was summoned by the Ahvaz Security Police.
- During his concert in Tehran on 12 May 2014, when Yarrahi could not obtain a permit for a concert in Ahvaz, he brought a bottle of Karoon's polluted water on stage and declared his support.
- Yarrahi managed to obtain a permit for a concert in Ahvaz in February 2015 after four years. In a symbolic act and in protest against the air pollution in Ahvaz, he performed on stage wearing a mask.
- In 2016, Yarrahi released the single "Khak" in protest against the officials' neglect and handling of the dust crisis and air pollution in Ahvaz. On 20 September, Yarrahi held a free concert for the marginalized people of Tehran in a brick oven in Shams Abad area, bringing all the professional facilities of his other concerts with him. At the end of the program, he distributed a meal for dinner among all the attendees, with a total population of over a thousand people present.
- During his concert in Tehran on 9 March 2017, Yarrahi performed the song "Khak" in protest against the Ahvaz dust storm crisis, accompanied by a performance where two actors were covered in clay and dust, and the singer and musicians were wearing masks.
- In 2018, Yarrahi released the song "Che Chiza Shenidam" (What I've Heard) and considered it a reference to false claims of having a connection with Hujjat ibn al-Hasan, promoters of superstition, and deviants who pretend to be religious personalities and misuse religion as a tool.
- After the protests of 2017/2018 in Iran, Yarrahi defended the people's right to have an open political space in a letter to President Hassan Rouhani. He criticized the government's performance in dealing with the opposition and existing problems in the country. This letter was published in the Sharq newspaper with some modifications.
- During the Fajr Music Festival, when receiving the Barbad Award for the best pop singer, Yarrahi mentioned the inappropriate condition of Ahvaz's air and asked the officials to care about the people's well-being.
- At the peak of the protests by workers of the National Steel Company of Ahvaz, Yarrahi and his group wore the protesting workers' uniforms (borrowed from the workers themselves) during his concert on 27 December 2018 at Ahvaz's Aftab Hall. This act received numerous reactions from domestic and foreign media, and a few days after this performance, he was summoned by the Music Office Security. A day later, he released the second song from the album "Social Trilogy I" called "Paresang." The song provoked various reactions and was recognized as the most critical and political song after the Islamic Revolution, both domestically and on social media. The music video of "Paresang," with an anti-war theme, led Mehdi Yarrahi to face censorship. While some believe that his censorship was more related to the anti-war clip than his concert in solidarity with the detained workers of Ahvaz National Steel Company. As a consequence for worker support and the song he was banned from performing and appearing on stage and television by the Ministry of Culture and Islamic Guidance and Islamic Republic of Iran Broadcasting. After six months and easing the ban from singing on 17 July 2019, he was again banned from performing in February 2020.
- Yarrahi released the song "Ahle Nakhle" in 2019, showing his solidarity with flood-affected people in southern and western Iran, accompanied by a clip featuring images of the flood-stricken areas.
- After the protests of 2019 in Iran, Yarrahi took the stage in Ahvaz on 12 and 13 December, while singing one of his social songs titled "SarSam" in memory of the victims of the recent protests in Iran. In his program, he criticized the performance of the country's authorities, including the Islamic Revolutionary Guard Corps and President Rouhani, emphasizing the need for criticism for all individuals and government agencies. He said, 'Just as the security apparatus can criticize the cultural and artistic sphere, we should also be able to criticize them. We should be able to criticize the Revolutionary Guards. No official should consider himself sacred and immune to criticism.' Following the sanctions imposed on the Fajr Festival by a group of theater and cinema artists after the suppression of the 2019 protests and the authorities' cover-up regarding the shooting down of Ukraine International Airlines Flight 752, Yarrahi published a note in support of this civil protest and expressed his serious support for it, with the hope that artists would not give in and stand firm against its costs.
- On the death anniversary of Sahar Khodayari (Blue Girl), Yarrahi released the song "Dokhtare Abi" (Blue Girl's Song) in memory of girls who are victims of ignorance and prejudice. In describing this work, he wrote, 'A tribute to the girls who are still victims of meaningless violence. With the hope for a future free of ignorance and violence against girls!'"
- Yarrahi dedicated the song "Lakposht" to addressing the problems of migration and the wounds of refugees. He also pointed out the damages caused by war, negligence, and ignorance of the authorities, expressing empathy for the people's pains.
- On the anniversary of the shooting down of Ukraine International Airlines Flight 752, Yarrahi released the song "Akse Shod" (Becoming a Picture) to express his solidarity with the families of the victims of this incident.
- On 4 October 2022, Yarrahi supported the protests that occurred after the killing of Mahsa Amini by the Guidance Patrol, by releasing the song "Sorud-e Zan" (Women's Anthem) in collaboration with the Women's Freedom Movement. His third work (the second piece from the collection of anthems) titled "Sorud-e Zendegi" (Anthem of Life) was published on 21 November 2022, in collaboration with the Women's Freedom Movement, to address the issues of women's rights and freedom movements.

== Discography ==
=== Albums ===
- 2011: Set me free
- 2013: Emperor
- 2015: Like a statue
- 2017: Full Length Mirror

=== Singles ===
- 2010: "Empty coffin" (Taboote Khali)
- 2011: "Border" (Marz)
- 2011: "My heart is wherever you are" (Har Jaye Donyaei Delam Oonjast)
- 2011: "tonight has also gone" (Emshabam Gozasht)
- 2011: "More attractive" (Jazabtar)
- 2011: "Reward" (Eydi)
- 2012: "Wall" (Divar)
- 2012: "look at me" (Be Man Negah Kon)
- 2012: "Say Something" (Ye Chizi Begoo)
- 2012: "Dandelion" (Ghasedak)
- 2013: "The important thing is" (Mohem Ine)
- 2013: "Compromise" (Sazesh)
- 2013: "Who taught you (arabic)"
- 2014: "Spring (the Arabic)" (Fasle Bahar)
- 2014: "Gazelle (Ghazal, arabic)"
- 2014: "Thy tears" (Boghze To)
- 2014: "Call to prayer" (Azan)
- 2014: "May God be with you" (Khoda Be Hamrat)
- 2014: "fireplace" (Atashkade)
- 2015: "Don't think about me" (Fekre Man Nabash)
- 2015: "chaos" (Ashoob)
- 2015: "Why won't you come" (Chera Nemiresi)
- 2016: "Soil" (Khak)
- 2016: "Don't say I didn't tell you" (Nagoo Nagofti)
- 2016: "Breath" (Nafas)
- 2016: "Need" (Hajat)
- 2017: "Coldness is near" (Sarma Nazdike)
- 2017: "The things that I've heard" (Che chiza shenidam)
- 2017: "21 days later" (Bisto yek rooz ba'd)
- 2017: "Your eyes" (Cheshm e to)
- 2017: "Autumn" (Paeez)
- 2018: "Hayek" (Arabic)
- 2018: "Indoctrination" (Talghin)
- 2018: "Cool" (Sarsaam)
- 2018: "Pare Sang" (Broken Stone)
- 2019: "Enkar" (Denial)
- 2019: "Ahle Nakhal" (From Palm)
- 2019: "Nemisheh Edameh Dad" (Can't continue)
- 2019: "Tolou Mikonam" (I will rise)
- 2020: "Asrar" (Secrets)
- 2020: "Dokhtaraneh" (Girly)
- 2020: "Laakposht" (Turtle)
- 2021: "Aks Shod" (Turned in to a Picture)
- 2021: "Ahwak"
- 2021: "Ghafas Bas" (Cut the Cage)
- 2022: "Soroode Zan" (Women's Anthem)
- 2022: "Soroode Yendegi" (Life's Anthem)
- 2023: "Roosarito" (your scarf)

== Awards ==
- Best pop album (for the album Emperor), experts' choice, the second annual ceremony of Musicema in 2013
- Best pop song (for the song "Emperor"), experts' choice, the second annual ceremony of Musicema in 2013
- Best people's choice TV theme song (for the song "Sazesh 'Compromise'" for the TV show Mah-e Asal), the first TV ceremony of the program Se Setareh in 2014
- Barbad award for the best pop singer of the year for the album Ayneh Ghadi [Full Length Mirror] in Fajr Music Festival (September 2016 – 2017)
- Best singer of the year in regard to song choice in the 2nd Afshin Yadollahi Songwriting Awards ceremony in 2018.

== See also ==
- Nazila Maroufian
- Elaheh Mohammadi
- Niloofar Hamedi
