= Michel Valette =

Michel Valette (born 14 June 1928 in Colmar, France - 14 March 2016) was a cabaret performer, actor, composer, cartoonist and writer.

In 1954, he created the cabaret La Colombe in Paris in the Île de la Cité, and over the next ten years, he was beginning to make more than 200 artists, including Guy Béart, Anne Sylvestre, Pierre Perret, Jean Ferrat, Maurice Fanon, Francesca Solleville, Hélène Martin, Jean Vasca, Henri Gougaud, Georges Moustaki, Marc Ogeret, Avron and Claude Philippe Evrard, Bernard Haller, Henri Guybet and Romain Bouteille.

In 1964, he was artistic director of the Cabaret Arsouille Milord. It was reviewed in the program starring Catherine Sauvage, Serge Gainsbourg, Guy Béart and Helene Martin. In 1969, he founded the SDA Mouffe (Service Diffusion Artistique) of the House and the host for four and a half years at the same time, he was responsible for the administration of the old Theatre Mouffetard.

In 1975, he starred in movies like "Une partie de plasir" by Claude Chabrol, as well as in films by Jean Delannoy and Paul Vecchiali and among others as well as on television. Then at Chaillot theater in 1989 where he played the Duke of Rochefort in D'Artagnan, directed by Jérôme Savary and Christophe Malavoy. He was part of the "théâtre des cinquante" led by Andreas Voutsinas. He played at Théâtre La Bruyère and toured in Le Malade Imaginaire, directed by Karim Salah, he played the role of Jacques Béralde Fabbri in the play. He also played in Karamazov opened in Cartoucherie de Vincennes and La Rochelle, directed by Anita Picchiarini where he took the role of Starets.

In 1988, he performed in Do that love, directed by Kazem Shahryari at the Arlequin and recorded his first 45 songs recorded on several CDs: "Michel Valette sings Gilbert Hennevic" (Jacques Canetti's home), "De la Colombe the Colombière", "my heart to sing" and "I met wonderful people."

Meanwhile, he wrote, "De Verdun à Cayenne" (ISBN 978-2-84654-150-3)(From Verdun to Cayenne), the true story of Robert Porchet, peace activist from the beginning the 20th century, after three years of military service, he went to the battlefields of the First World War. His desertion after the Battle of Verdun, his capture and his life in the penal colony of Cayenne until the War Resisters' International succeeded to shorten his sentence and once obtained he went back to France.

From 1993 to 2000 he founded and animated in Essonne, the cultural association "Chant'Essonne" whose goal is to spread and promote the French song in Essonne. He made known artists defend the French song quality.

As of December 2008 he had recently written a book-document of more than 600 pages: L'histoire de la Colombe ("The History of la Colombe") in which he wrote many anecdotes from the beginnings of many French singers in the 1960s (i.e. Guy Béart, Anne Sylvestre, Pierre Perret, Jean Ferrat). He is currently rewriting a 400-page version Le Joli temps de la Colombe to make a cheaper edition.
