= L'Âge d'or (song) =

Inspirational song by Leo Ferre

L’Age d’Or
- by Leo Ferre
- English: The Golden Age
- Native name: L’Age d’or
- Catalogue: Léo Ferré (1916-1993)
- Recorded: 1966
- Duration: 2:57

"L'Âge d'or" is a song by Léo Ferré, released in 1966. It is a utopian song full of hope, considered one of his classics.

== History ==
The song was composed during the summer of 1959. Léo Ferré performed it for the first time on the radio on September 19, 1959 (see the album La Mauvaise Graine). A version orchestrated by Paul Mauriat was recorded in November 1960 during the studio sessions for the album Paname. This unreleased version was released for the first time in 2013. This is the orchestral soundtrack without the singer's vocals (it is unclear whether Ferré actually recorded a vocal take, or why he left this song out). The musical arrangement differs significantly from the one recorded and published in 1966.

Ferré performed this song live as early as 1959. He performed it on the radio in March 1961, accompanied by the small group led by Jean-Michel Defaye, who accompanied him on stage at the Alhambra, where he performed this song (with a vocal sextet in addition). The arrangement that Defaye made on this occasion will be included unchanged, with a few minor differences, in the "definitive" version of 1966.

== Production ==
Arrangements and musical direction: Jean-Michel Defaye Sound recording: Gerhard Lehner

== Covers ==
"L'Âge d'or" has been performed by Catherine Sauvage in 1961, Francesca Solleville in 1962, Renée Claude in 1994, Mama Béa in 1995 (on the album Du côté de chez Léo), Marc Ogeret in 1999, Annick Cisaruk and Serge Utgé-Royo in 2010, Cali in 2015, and Motivé-e-s in 2017, among others.
