= EPM Musique =

- Founded: 1986
- Founder: François Dacla
- Genre: Chanson, theater, spoken word, jazz
- Country of origin: France
- Official website: www.epmmusique.fr

EPM Musique is a French record label that was created in 1986 by François Dacla, former president of RCA France. The label specializes in Chanson and its legacy. It is also dedicated to poetry, theater, and children's music.

"EPM is a French label whose interests include classic American jazz from the '30s through '50s." The label reissued earlier jazz recordings. Memphis Minnie's recordings were particularly reissued.

Most of its catalog is distributed by Universal Music Group.

== Artists ==
- Léo Ferré
- Anne Sylvestre
- Michèle Bernard
- Georges Chelon
- Marc Ogeret
- Marc Robine
- Francis Lemarque
- Monique Morelli
- Hélène Martin
- Julos Beaucarne
- Diane Dufresne
- Anna Prucnal
- Anne Vanderlove
- Claudine Lebègue
- Francesca Solleville
- Marcel Dadi
- Pierre Dac
- Michel Buhler
- Jean Vasca
- Pierre Meige
