= Anne Sylvestre =

French singer-songwriter (1934–2020)

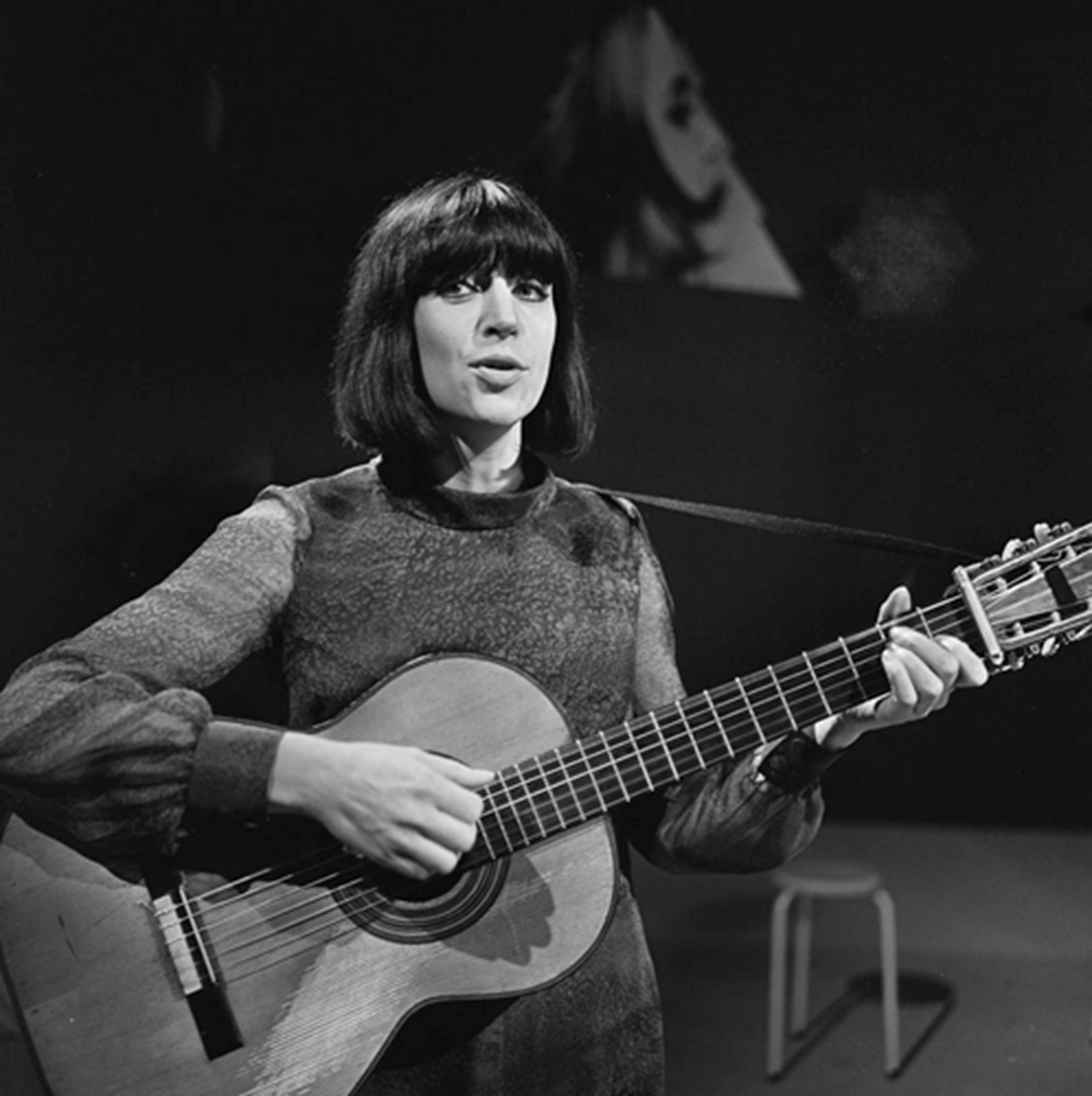
- Sylvestre (1965)

Background information
- Born: Anne-Marie Beugras; 20 June 1934; Lyon, France
- Died: 30 November 2020 (aged 86) Neuilly-sur-Seine, France
- Genre: Chanson
- Occupations: Singer, songwriter
- Instrument: Vocals
- Years active: 1957–2020
- Labels: Philips; Anne Sylvestre; EPM Musique; Universal
- Website: annesylvestre.com

Anne Sylvestre (French: [an silvɛstʁ], born Anne-Marie Beugras; 20 June 1934 – 30 November 2020) was a French singer-songwriter.

== Biography ==
Anne Sylvestre was born in Lyon on 20 June 1934. She was the daughter of Albert Beugras and the sister of writer Marie Chaix. Her father was a politician turned collaborationist during the Occupation of France. Marie Chaix wrote a book about their father's role during the Occupation, Les Lauriers du lac de Constance (1974).

While studying literature at the Sorbonne in the fifties, Sylvestre started singing in cabarets and was discovered by Michel Valette. Jean-Claude Pascal recorded her song "Porteuse d'eau" (Waterbearer) under the title "La terre" (The Dirt, 1958). She started recording in 1959, and Georges Brassens wrote a preface for her second album (1962). Since 1962, she also wrote and sang for children (Fabulettes). She wrote a song for Serge Reggiani, "La Maumariée" (The Wrongly-Wed Bride, 1968). She recorded a comical duet with Boby Lapointe, "Depuis l'temps que j'l'attends mon prince charmant" (I've been waiting for my prince charming for ages, 1969).

In 1973, she created her own recording company to release her albums. In 1976, along with Isabelle Aubret, she recorded the album Fabulettes et Chansons d'Anne Sylvestre. In 1987, she put on a show with Quebec singer Pauline Julien (Gémeaux croisées, Crossed Gemini, 1987–1988). With fellow singer Michèle Bernard, she put on a show aimed at children, Lala et le Cirque du vent (Lala and the Wind's Circus, 1992–1996). She also sang on scene with Agnès Bihl in the show Carré de Dames (Four of Queens, 2012).

Her songs encompass a large range of subjects. Her love songs are often in a nostalgic mode ("Le Pêcheur de perles", The Pearl Fisher, 1967; "La Chambre d'or", Golden Room, 1969). Some of her songs could not be broadcast because of their strong engagement, and others contain profanity, for instance "Les Gens qui doutent" (Doubting People, 1977). Some songs deal with difficult subjects such as poverty ("Porteuse d'eau", Waterbearer, 1961), homelessness ("Pas difficile", Not difficult, 1986), education in a consumer society ("Abel Caïn, mon fils", Abel Cain, my son, 1971), war ("Berceuse de Bagdad", Lullaby from Baghdad, 2003). Numerous songs give a feminist take on women's life: "Non, tu n'as pas de nom" (You have no name, 1973) about abortion, "La Vache engagée" (Engaged Cow, 1975), "Une sorcière comme les autres" (A Witch like any other one, 1975) about maternity, "La Faute à Ève" (Eve's Fault, 1978) about women's rights, "Rose" (1981) about teen pregnancy, or "Juste une femme" (Only a woman, 2013) about sexism. She also supported same-sex marriage ("Gay marions-nous", 2007).

Anne Sylvestre died on November 30, 2020 in Neuilly-sur-Seine after having a stroke. She was about to go on tour at that time. She was interred in the family vault in Saint-Eusèbe, Saône-et-Loire.

== Discography ==
Year	Album	Peak positions	Certification
Year	Album	FR	Certification
1961	Anne Sylvestre chante…		
1962	La femme du vent		
1963	Vous aviez, ma belle		
1964	T'en souviens-tu la Seine		
1965	Lazare et Cécile		
1967	Berceuse pour moi		
1968	Mousse		
1969	Aveu		
1969	Fabulettes		
1971	Abel, Caïn, mon fils		
1973	Les pierres dans mon jardin		
1975	Une sorcière comme les autres		
1975	L'école		
1976	Les Nouvelles Fabulettes		
1977	Comment je m'appelle		
1977	Chansons pour…		
1978	J'ai de bonnes nouvelles		
1979	La rue, l'école, le square		
1981	Dans la vie en vrai		
1985	Écrire pour ne pas mourir		
1986	Tant de choses à vous dire		
1989	La ballade de Calamity Jane		
1994	D'amour et de mots		
1997	Chante... au bord de La Fontaine		
1998	Les arbres verts		
2000	Partage des eaux		
2003	Les chemins du vent		
2007	Bye mélanco	81	
2013	Juste une femme	193	

== Awards ==
- 1963 : Grand Prix du disque de l'Académie Charles-Cros
- 1965 : Grand Prix du disque de l'Académie Charles-Cros
- 1993 : Officier of the Ordre National du Mérite
- 2002 : Officier of the Order of Legion of Honnour
- 2009 : Grande médaille de la chanson française
