= Vase with lid =

Vase by René Crevel

- Vase with lid (René Crevel)
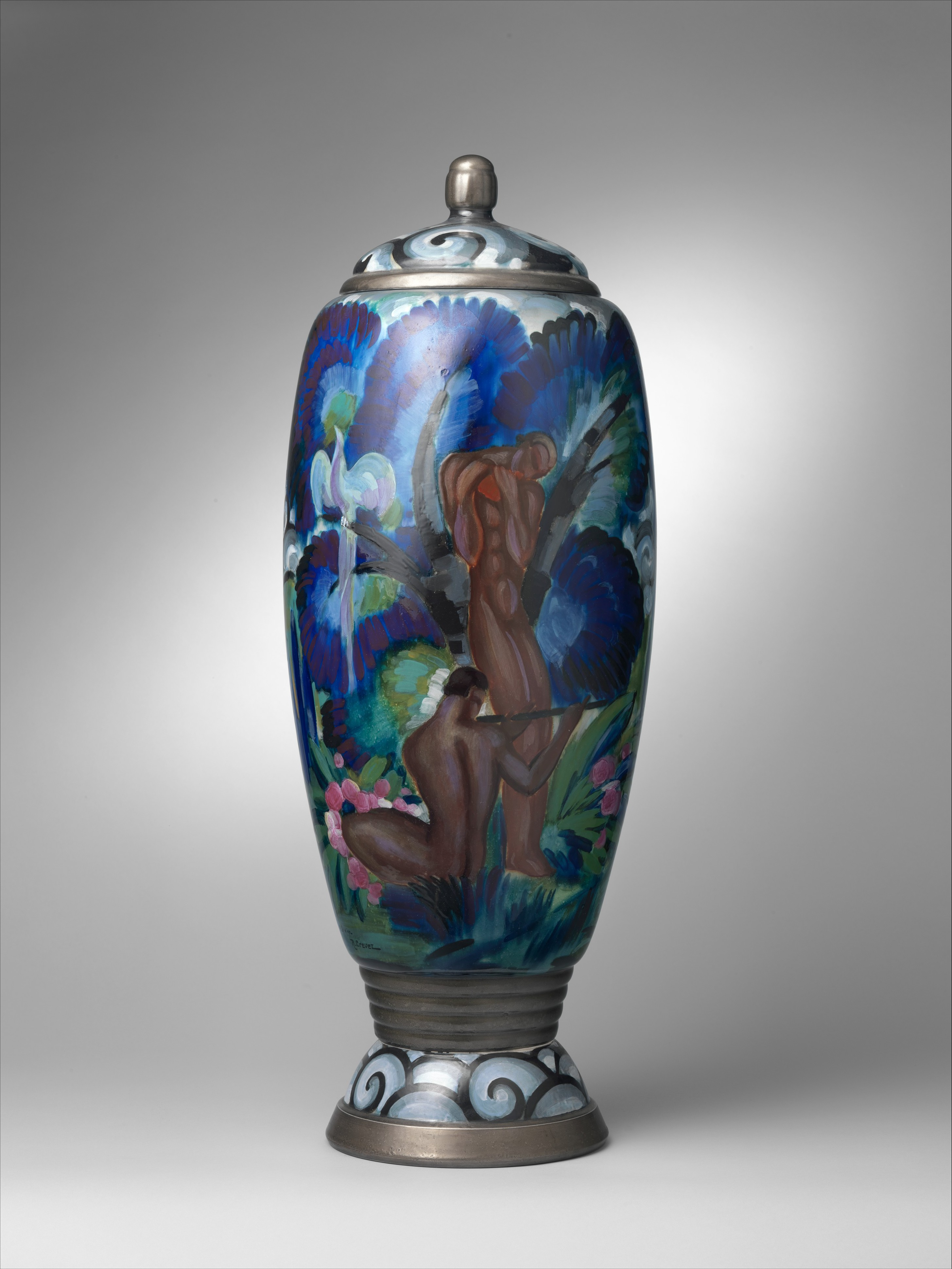
- Artist: René Crevel
- Year: 1926
- Medium: porcelain
- Location: Metropolitan Museum of Art
- Accession No.: 1987.473.11ab
- Identifiers: The Met object ID: 484923

Vase with lid is a 1926 vase by René Crevel in glazed and painted porcelain, painted in a Fauvist style, and made at the Manufacture nationale de Sèvres. It is in the collection of the Metropolitan Museum of Art.

Crevel designed the decorative painting, which was replicated and painted on a stock porcelain blank by a craftsman at the Sèvres workshops near Paris.

== Creation ==
In 1925, Crevel was awarded the commission to decorate the ceramics pavilion of the International Exposition of Modern Industrial and Decorative Arts in Paris. In addition to creating decorative wallpaper and panels, Cervel painted and designed six vases to be produced by acclaimed French porcelain manufacturers. The painting style on this series of Art Deco vases combines the landscape and figurative genres.
