= La guillotine permanente =

Revolutionary song from the French Revolution

Song
- Released: 1793
- Genre: Revolutionary French song

"La guillotine permanente" ("The Permanent Guillotine") is a French revolutionary song from the French Revolution. The lyrics regard the guillotine and its usage as a weapon of the revolution.

== Background ==
=== Historic circumstances ===
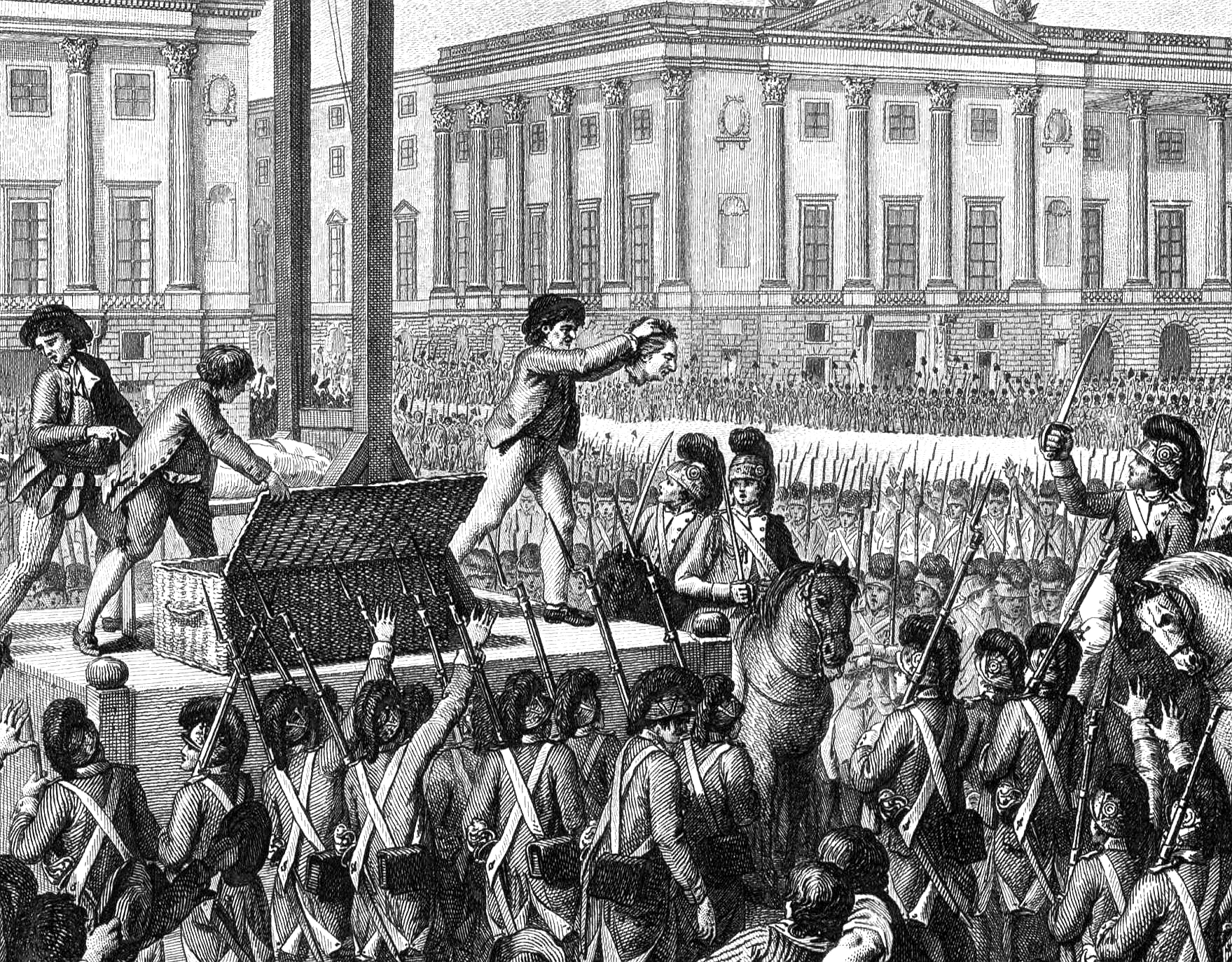
Artistic impression of a public execution during the French Revolution

Around the year 1789, the National Constituent Assembly was debating about a new criminal law for France. Among the representatives of the bourgeoisie was the doctor Joseph-Ignace Guillotin, who argued for an equalization of the capital punishment. He suggested that all executions may be carried out as a beheading through a "simple mechanism". Guillotin's efforts led to beheading machines being referred to as "Guillotine" when they were first regularly used in the year 1792. (Misleadingly, Guillotin is often called the "inventor of the guillotine". The lyrics of La guillotine permanente say that Guillotin "made" the machine. In reality, Guillotin was not involved in the design and construction of the guillotine.)

=== The melody ===
The melody of "La guillotine permanente" was known long before the French Revolution; its roots date back to the 16th century. The old folk song "Si le roi m'avait donné" is sung to this melody, Molière quoted it in his comical work The Misanthrope, which premiered in the year 1666. The lyrics of "La guillotine permanente" are not the only ones written to this melody during the French Revolution.

== Lyrics ==
Original lyrics:

Le député Guillotin
Dans la médecine
Très expert et très malin
Fit une machine
Pour purger le corps français
De tous les gens à projets
C'est la guillotine, ô gué (Note: "Ô gué" is an old French expression of joy.)
C'est la guillotine

Pour punir la trahison
La haute rapine
Ces amateurs de blasons
Ces gens qu'on devine
Voilà pour qui l'on a fait
Ce dont on connaît l'effet
C'est la guillotine, ô gué
C'est la guillotine

A force de comploter
La horde mutine
A gagné sans y penser
Migraine maline
Pour guérir ces messieurs-là
Un jour on les mènera
A la guillotine, ô gué
A la guillotine

De la France on a chassé
La noble vermine
On a tout rasé, cassé
Et tout mis en ruine
Mais de noble on a gardé
De mourir le cou tranché
Par la guillotine, ô gué
Par la guillotine

Messieurs les nobles mutins
Dont chacun s'échine
Soufflant par des efforts vains
La guerre intestine
Si nous vous prenons vraiment
Vous mourrez très noblement
A la guillotine, ô gué
A la guillotine

Le dix nous a procuré
Besogne de reste
Les traîtres ont abondé
C'est pis qu'une peste
Comme on n'en veut pas manquer
On punit sans déplanter
La machine reste, ô gué
La machine reste

English translation:

The deputy Guillotin (Note: This refers to Joseph-Ignace Guillotin.)
In the medicine
Very educated and very smart
Made a machine
To purge the body of France
From all people with projects
That's the guillotine, hurray
That's the guillotine

To punish the treason
The huge theft
Those enthusiasts for coat of arms
These people, one knows which
For those we made it
It, whose effect we know
That's the guillotine, hurray
That's the guillotine

By stirring up
The mutinous horde
One got without having it in mind
Terrible headaches
To cure those gentlemen
We will lead them one day
To the guillotine, hurray
To the guillotine

From France we hunted them
The noble bundle
We shaved everything off, terminated everything
And ruined all
But what we kept from the nobles
Is to die with cut necks
By the guillotine, hurray
By the guillotine

Those gentlemen, the noble traitors
Those who have withdrawn themselves
Suffer from useless causes
The internal war
When we take them seriously
They will die very nobly
On the guillotine, hurray
On the guillotine

The 10th has brought us (Note: "The 10th" refers to 10. Brumaire II in the French Republican calendar, which is the 31st Octobre 1793 in the gregorian calendar. On this day, over a dozen girondins were executed in Paris.)
A lot of work
There are many traitors
It is worse than a plague
We don't want to miss it
To punish without exceptions
The machine stays, hurray
The machine stays

== In popular culture ==
"La guillotine permanente" can be heard in the video game Assassin's Creed Unity, which is set in the French Revolution.

== Recordings ==
- Catherine Ribeiro: 1989… Déjà ! (1988)
- Jean-Louis Caillat: Chansons de la Révolution (1989)
- Marc Ogeret: Chante La Révolution (1989)
