= Pierre Louki =

French actor and singer/songwriter

Pierre Louki (née Varenne, 1920-2006) was a French actor and singer/songwriter.

Pierre Varenne was born 25 July 1920, in Yonne, the son of Georges Varenne, a teacher killed in Auschwitz concentration camp.

Varenne learnt the theatre in Auxerre, before going to Paris in the early 1950s, where he met Roger Blin and Jean-Louis Barrault. He subsequently played in Blin's production of Waiting for Godot. He also began song-writing at this time.

Among the interpreters of Louki's more than 200 chansons (besides himself) were Jean Ferrat, Catherine Sauvage, Marcel Amont, Juliette Gréco, Cora Vaucaire, Isabelle Aubret, Annie Cordy, Francesca Solleville, Les Frères Jacques, Philippe Clay, Colette Renard, and Georges Brassens. He toured with the latter and wrote a book of recollections entitled Avec Brassens (éditions Christian Pirot, 1999, ISBN 2-86808-129-0).

He received the Académie Charles Cros prize (1972), and SACEM André-Didier Mauprey prize (1999). Pierre Louki also appeared as stage author and actor and broadcast on France-Culture, while on television he took part in programmes of Jean-Christophe Averty.

He wrote several books for children and his memoirs are Quelques confidences (éditions Christian Pirot, septembre 2006).

Louki died 21 December 2006.
