= The Lovers of Verona =

1949 film by André Cayatte

- Theatrical release poster
- French: Les amants de Vérone
- Directed by: André Cayatte
- Written by: André Cayatte; Jacques Prévert
- Produced by: Raymond Borderie
- Starring: Pierre Brasseur; Marcel Dalio; Serge Reggiani; Louis Salou
- Cinematography: Henri Alekan
- Edited by: Christian Gaudin
- Music by: Joseph Kosma
- Production company: CICC
- Distributed by: Les Films Corona
- Release date: 7 March 1949 (France)
- Running time: 105 minutes
- Country: France
- Language: French

The Lovers of Verona (French: Les amants de Vérone) is a 1949 French romantic drama mystery film co-written and directed by André Cayatte, loosely based on the William Shakespeare play Romeo and Juliet. The film was a joint project of screenwriter Jacques Prevert and director Cayatte and enjoyed great international success. It was released in Italy in 1949, then internationally in 1951.

== Plot ==
Shortly after World War II, Angelo, a glassblower from Murano, and Georgia Maglia, the daughter of a fascist magistrate, are cast as stand-ins for the stars of a film version of Romeo and Juliet being shot on location in Venice. Inevitably they fall in love and their affair parallels the Shakespeare tragedy. The principal difficulty is the scheming of Rafaële, the Magia family's ruthless consigliere. In the end, Angelo is killed and Georgia dies at his side.

== Cast ==
- Serge Reggiani as Angelo (Romeo)
- Anouk Aimée as Georgia (Juliet)
- Martine Carol as Bettina Verdi, the star of the film
- Pierre Brasseur as Rafaële
- Marcel Dalio as Amedeo Maglia
- Marianne Oswald as Laetitia
- René Génin as the guardian of the tomb
- Yves Deniaud as Ricardo, an actor
- Charles Blavette as the head of the glassworks
- Marcel Pérès as Domini, a glassblower

== Production ==
The film was shot at the Billancourt Studios in Paris and on location in Venice. The sets were designed by art director René Moulaert.

In his memoirs, cinematographer Henri Alekan recalled when 16-year-old Anouk Aimée was forced to dive completely naked into the cold waters of the Adige river, without anyone managing to keep away the onlookers obviously interested in the scene.

== Critical reception ==
TV Guide called the film "[a]n intriguing romance", while Bosley Crowther of The New York Times called it "a story set within a weird and grotesque frame of contemporary morbidness in Venice and gaudy film-making in Italy." Pauline Kael wrote, "The film's sensuous poetic elegance contrasts with the seamy elements it encompasses... You may feel you've been made too aware of the film's artistic intentions, and the romanticism can drive you a little nuts."
