= Eugene McCown =

American painter

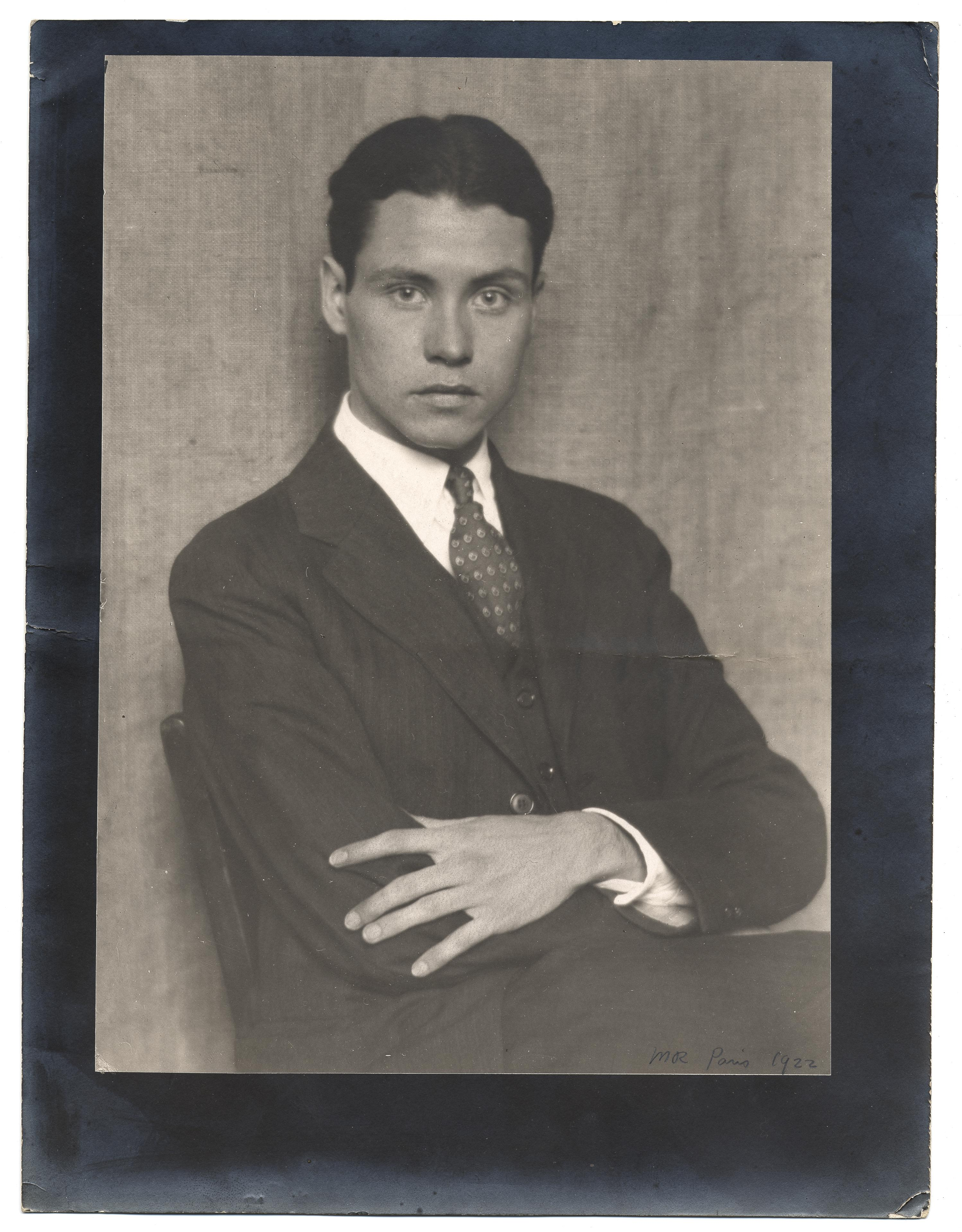
Photographic portrait of McCown, 1922

Eugene McCown (also known as Eugene Mac Cown) (July 27, 1898 – April 23, 1966) was an American pianist, painter of the École de Paris, and writer. He was mainly notable for his participation in the chic bohemian set of Paris in the Roaring Twenties.

== Early life ==
William Eugene McCown was born in El Dorado Springs. He was the son of William Henry McCown and Inez Boyer. In 1900, the family settled in Deepwater, where McCown's father ran a prominent hardware store. After his mother's death, he moved with his sister Laurayne to his maternal uncle's in Kansas City, where he would be given a formal education. He was taught how to sketch and play the piano with great success. At the Central High school of Kansas City, he met Virgil Thomson (the future composer and critic) who was to become a life-long friend. When he had completed two years of journalism at the University of Missouri, McCown went to New York to paint at the Art Students League and at Woodstock, where he studied with Andrew Dasburg and Eugene Speicher. For six months, in 1920, he traveled through the West Indies as a painter. In May 1920, his first productions (landscapes and portraits) were exhibited in Caracas. On his return to New York, McCown mingled in the local artistic circles.

== Career ==
McCown's ability to play the popular jazz of the age on the piano, his talent as a painter and his unabashed charm soon made him very popular in Paris. After only a couple of months in France, he was engaged as a jazz pianist at Le Boeuf sur le Toit, the most famous nightclub of the roaring twenties in Paris. There he mingled with the most elegant bohemian crowd, such as André Gide, Cole Porter, F. Scott and Zelda Fitzgerald, Gertrude Stein, Winnaretta Singer, Isadora Duncan. He also met with French poet Jean Cocteau, whom, it was rumored, he had an affair with, and British heiress and political activist Nancy Cunard. Thanks to Cunard's money, he was never penniless and traveled extensively. It is unclear whether McCown and Cunard were lovers, but he was certainly her protégé for many years and painted about seven portraits of her. During the winter of 1923, he began a love affair with the French journalist René Crevel. Along with Cocteau and Raymond Mortimer, Crevel did a lot to help McCown in his new career as a painter. In 1925, McCown's first Parisian show at the Effort moderne, Léonce Rosenberg's gallery, was a success. Within a week all the paintings and drawings were sold and many reviews in French, American and British newspapers praised his “highly poetic work” as well as "the cleanness of line and the delicacy of detail". Clive Bell, Waldemar George and Maurice Raynal would promote his art. In the early 1920s, McCown's paintings depict men in various stages of intimacy. His style is mainly influenced by Picasso, Henri Rousseau and the Quattrocento Italians. After this exhibition, McCown became the toast of the town. He was known for his wit and promiscuity. McCown indulged himself in drugs and alcohol. Crevel would distance himself and write a cruel portrait of his former lover in his novel La Mort difficile, where one can easily recognize McCown in Arthur Bruggle. Several exhibitions were yet to be organized in Paris and New York between 1929 and 1932. But now his name was mostly known for the wild parties he gave in his brand-new Art Deco studio designed by André Lurçat (a student of Robert Mallet-Stevens) and his many lovers (including Glenway Wescott, Hart Crane whom he helped get out of prison in July 1929, Raymond Mortimer, Paul Mooney, Richard Wyndham, Patrick Balfour…). After the 1929 stock market crash, many rich Americans sailed back to the US and McCown lost important supporters. In 1933 returned to New York City.

== Later life ==
On his return to New York, McCown was only 35 years old. However, it appeared that his life was behind him. Alcohol and drugs had already overshadowed his magnetism. Now penniless, he had to beg tirelessly from those who still cared for him. Realizing that his talent for painting and music was not enough, McCown was forced to give up all his artistic ambitions. Literally haunted by the memory of his past glory, he only enjoyed the company of former expatriates (Virgil Thomson, Klaus Mann, E. E. Cummings, Mercedes de Acosta, Janet Flanner, Monroe Wheeler, Eugene Berman...).

Twice he tried to escape his wretched circumstances. In 1943, his love for France made him join the American intelligence services. He was assigned a position of translator in London. Unfortunately, his physical and moral condition caused him to be discharged a few months after. In 1950, Doubleday published his roman à clef The Siege of Innocence, in which he describes the path of a young American artist of great beauty victim of the concupiscence of his companions.

At 50, McCown already looked like a destitute old man. However, with the financial help of a few staunch friends, he managed to reach the age of 67. In April 1966, he died at The New York Metropolitan hospital after an attempted suicide.

== Works reproductions ==
- McCown, Eugene and Blomshield, John, "La pintura in Puerto Rico", in Puerto Rico Ilustrado, March 20, 1920.
- McCown, Eugene, Portrait of Nancy Cunard, 1923, oil on board, 99.1 x 66 cm, in Cunard, Nancy, These Were The Hours, Memories of my Hours Press, Réanville and Paris, 1928-1931, edited with a foreword by Hugh Ford, Southern Illinois University Press, 1969.
- McCown, Eugene, Le Nu dans les fleurs, 1924, Le Bulletin de l'Effort moderne [Léonce Rosenberg, dir.], January, 1925, n°11, p. 24.
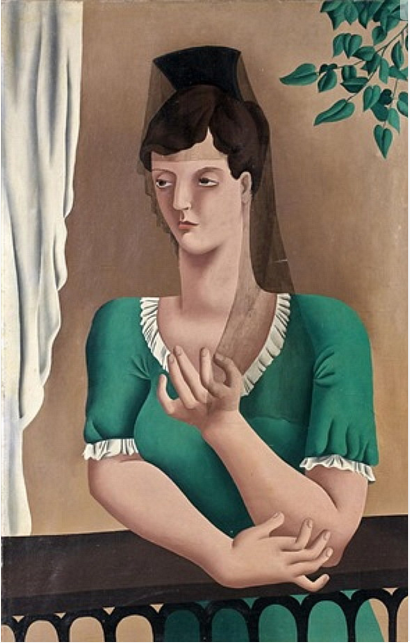
- Spanish Woman, by Eugene McCown, 1924
  McCown, Eugene, Le Joueur d'accordéon et L'Espagnole, 1924, Le Bulletin de l'Effort moderne [Léonce Rosenberg, dir.], February, 1925, n°12, p. 25.
- McCown, Eugene, Les Deux Nus à cheval et La Destinée, 1925, Le Bulletin de l'Effort moderne [Léonce Rosenberg, dir.], March, 1925, n°13, p. 25.
- McCown, Eugene, Les deux nus au lapin, 1925, Le Bulletin de l'Effort moderne [Léonce Rosenberg, dir.], April, 1925, n°14, p. 19.
- McCown, Eugene, Portrait of Janet Flanner, c.1925, oil on canvas, in Kagan, Jérôme, Eugene McCown, démon des Années folles, Paris, Séguier, p. 78.
- "Five Interesting New Pictures by Eugene McCown". British Vogue. Early January 1925. p. 57.
- Crevel, René, "Eugene MacCown [sic], peintre ingénu", in The Little Review, Spring 1925, n° 11, with 3 reproductions of McCown's work.
- Crevel, René, "Eugene MacCown [sic], peintre ingénu", in Cahiers de Belgique, June 1928, pp. 225–227, with 3 new reproductions of McCown's work.
- McCown, Eugene, Paintings, drawings, gouaches, Marie Sterner Galleries, Hours Press (ed), New York, 1930, with 4 reproductions of McCown's work.
- Aronson, Chil, Artistes américains modernes de Paris, Editions "Le Triangle", Paris, 1932, with 3 reproductions of McCown's works, p. 17.
- Kagan, Jérôme, "The Rogue of the roaring twenties", France-Amérique journal, October 2020, pp 64–73, with 4 reproductions of McCown's work.
- Kagan, Jérôme, Eugene McCown, démon des Années folles , Paris, Séguier, 2019, 480 pages, with 26 reproductions of McCown's work.

== Works on display ==
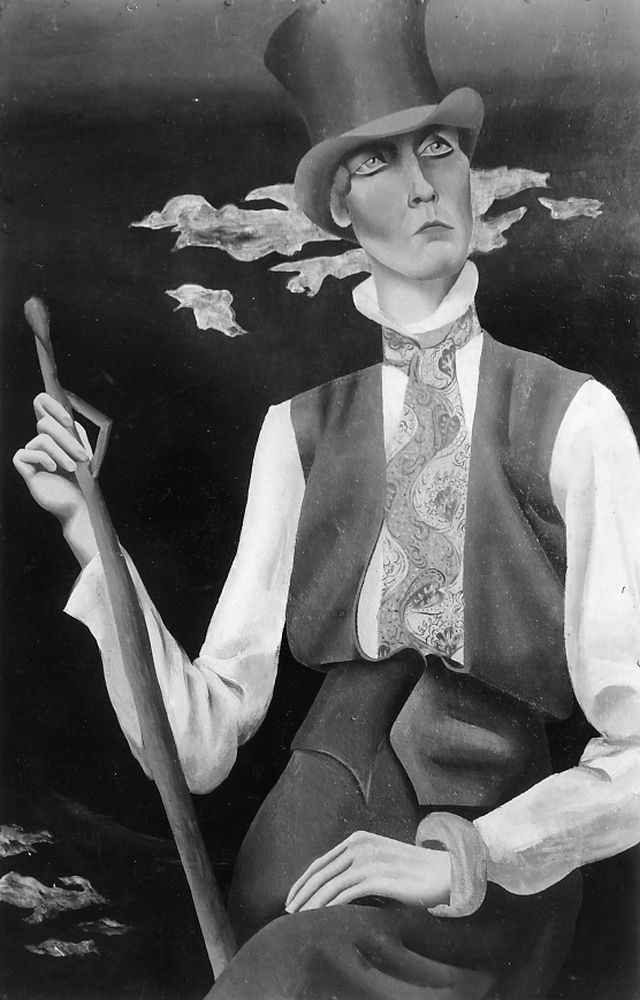
- Portrait of Nancy Cunard by Eugene McCown, c. 1923.
  McCown, Eugene, Portrait of Nancy Cunard, 1923, oil on board, 99.1 x 66 cm, Harry Ransom Center, The University of Texas at Austin.
- McCown, Eugene, The Picador, oil on canvas, 1928, 81.3 x 65.4 cm, The Memorial Art Gallery, University of Rochester.
- McCown, Eugene, Three Heads, 1937, gouache on cardboard, 59,1 x 76,2 cm, Detroit Institute of Arts.
