= Clément Doucet =

Belgian pianist (1895–1950)

Léon Clément Doucet (9 April 1895 – 15 October 1950) was a Belgian pianist. He was born and died in Brussels, Belgium. He studied for a time at the local Conservatoire, where his teacher, Arthur De Greef, had been a pupil of Franz Liszt.

His formal training was classical, and he traveled to the U.S. Some of his arrangements are still played today, including "Chopinata", a jazz tribute to several works by Frédéric Chopin, and "Lisztonia", a Fantasia for Piano on the motifs of Liszt.

After returning to Europe, he became the house pianist at the Parisian cabaret Le Boeuf sur le Toit, where he succeeded Jean Wiéner. He and Wiéner formed a piano duo which lasted from 1924 to 1939. They performed over 2000 concerts and made over 100 recordings of jazz, blues, and classical music, as well as a small number of recordings in which they accompanied French chansonniers. These include ten sides with Maurice Chevalier, and others, solo, with Édith Piaf and Yvonne George (Wiéner) and Jean Sablon and Germaine Sablon (Doucet).
