= Agnès Bihl =

French singer

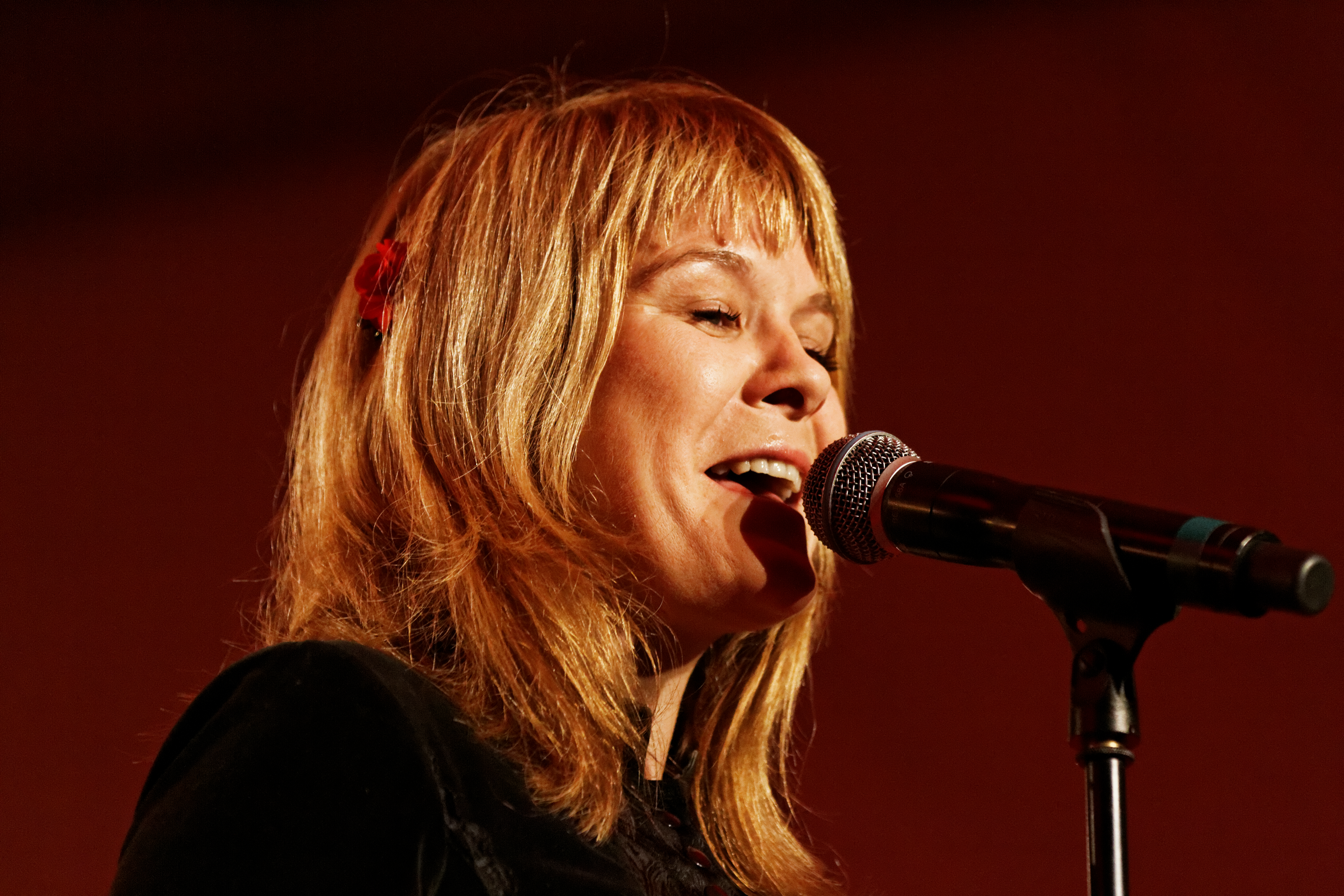
- Bihl in 2013

Background information
- Born: April 30, 1974 (age 51); Neuilly-sur-Seine, France

Agnès Bihl, born on April 30, 1974, in Neuilly-sur-Seine, is a French singer-songwriter.

== Biography ==
Born into a family of intellectuals, with a great-grandfather who founded L'Illustration and a grandmother who was a painter, as a child Bihl naturally became interested in all art forms, including writing and theater. As a student, she wrote stories until one of her friends, an accordionist, triggered her vocation by taking her to see Allain Leprest at the Cabaret libertaire parisien.

Inspired by Brel, Brassens, Renaud and Anne Sylvestre, Agnès Bihl appreciates the lyrics of French song. She sings reality as viewed through her world, combining poetry, comedy and activism. She describes herself on her website as a "feminine Renaud." A feminist, she is vitriolic about pro-life protesters, criticizes persons she calls "bitches" and addresses some difficult topics such as rape.

She made her debut at Limonaire in 1998, then in small rooms accompanied by four musicians (piano, drums, bass, cello), where she was discovered. Afterwards, Anne Sylvestre, Allain Leprest, Dikès, and Thomas Fersen invited her to introduce their shows. Her debut album, La Terre est blonde, was self-released in November 2001.

Her second album, Merci Maman Merci Papa was released 25 August 2005, and her third, Demandez le programme, 9 November 2007.

Invited by Charles Aznavour, she introduced him during his tour between October and December 2007.

In 2009, she met Dorothée Daniel, pianist and composer, and Didier Grebot, producer/director, with whom she recorded her fourth album Rêve Général(e) between June and September 2009. The album was released on 1 February 2010 and gave rise to a tour throughout the 2010/2011 season, starting in February 2010.

== Discography ==
Year	Album	Peak positions	Certification
Year	Album	FR	Certification
2001	La terre est blonde	–	
2005	Merci maman merci papa	118	
2007	Demandez le programme	191	
2010	Rêve général(e)	122	
2013	36 heures de la vie d'une femme	207	

== Awards ==
- 2005 : Grand Prix du disque de l'Académie Charles-Cros
- 2006 : Prix Félix-Leclerc (FrancoFolies de Montréal)
- 2006 : Prix Francis Lemarque
