= Le Bœuf sur le toit (cabaret) =

20th Century cabaret in Paris, France

Coordinates: 48°52′17″N 2°18′37″E

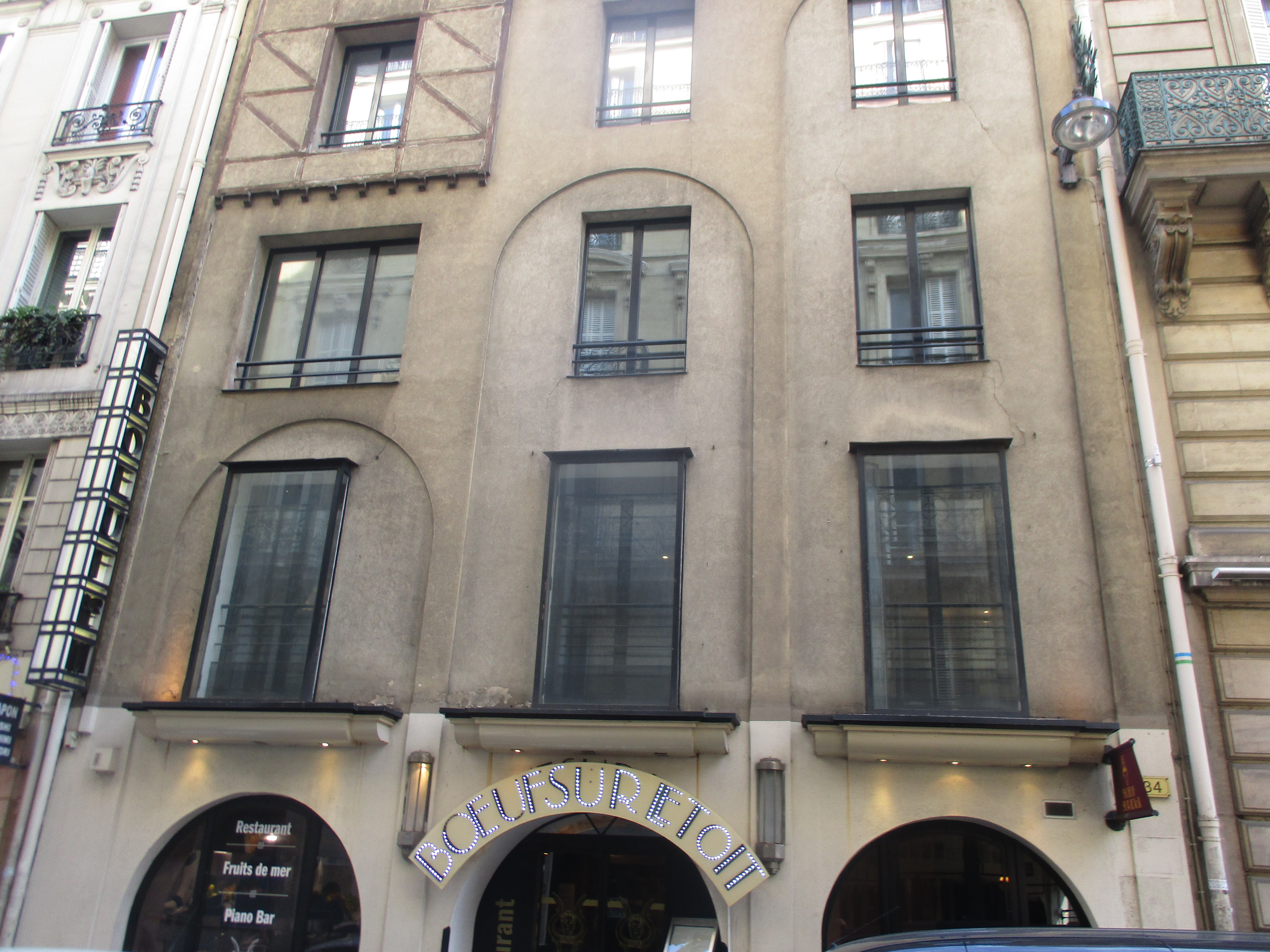
Le Bœuf sur le Toit today at 34 Rue du Colisée

Le Bœuf sur le toit 'The Ox on the Roof' is a celebrated cabaret-bar in Paris, founded in 1921 by Louis Moysés. It was originally located at 28, rue Boissy d'Anglas in the city’s 8th arrondissement. It was notably the gathering place for the avant-garde arts scene during the period between the wars. Maurice Sachs chronicled it in his 1939 book Au temps du Bœuf sur le toit (Paris: Nouvelle Revue critique, 1948). Currently it is located at 34, rue du Colisée, having moved five times within the 8th arrondissement. The current building dates from the 18th century.

== Origin of Le Bœuf ==
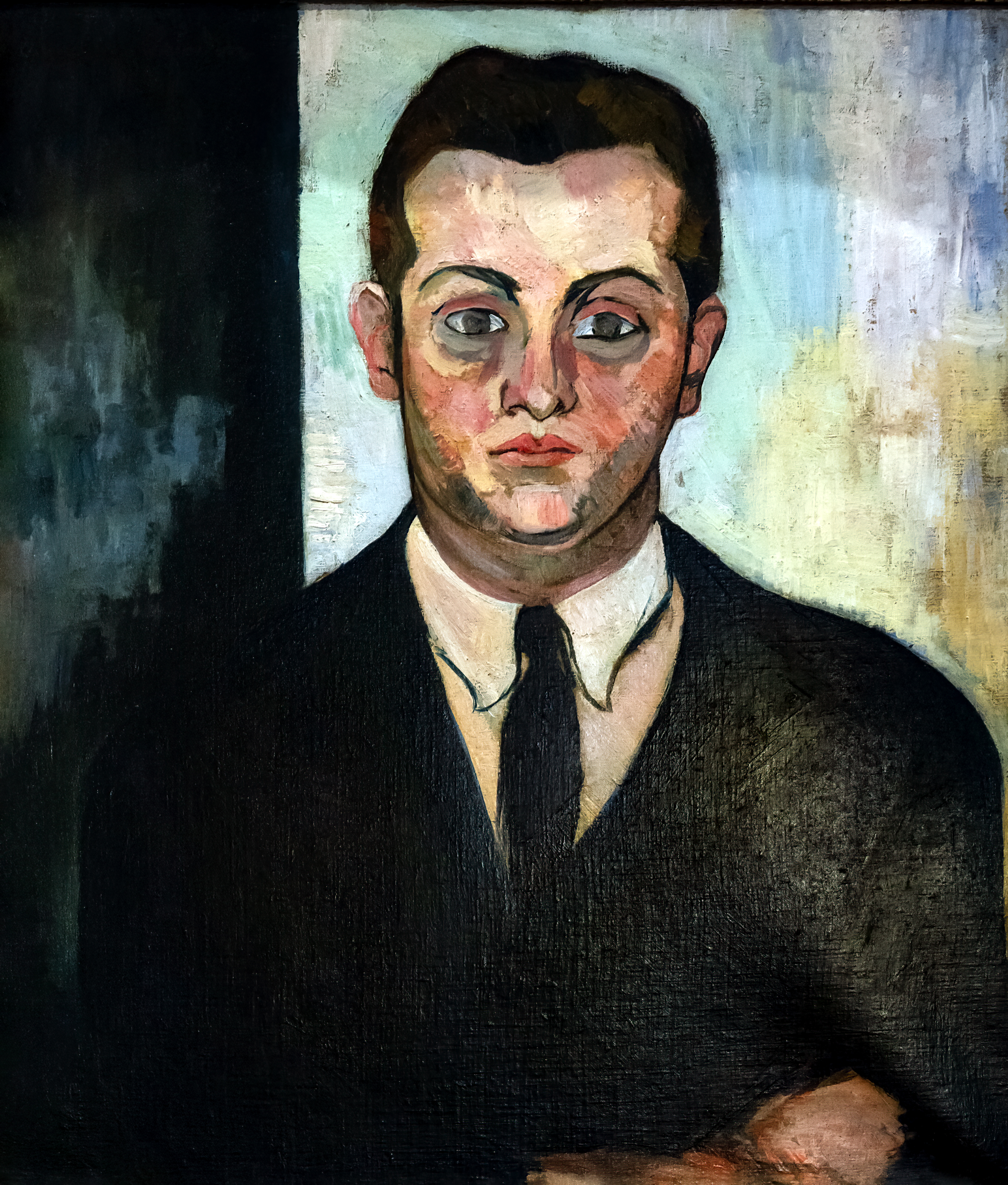
Louis Moysés by Suzanne Valadon

The composer Darius Milhaud had been in Brazil where he had been impressed by the folklore and a popular song of the time, O Boi no Telhado (The ox on the roof). Back in Paris in 1919 Milhaud and his composer friends formed a group called Les Six. The poet Jean Cocteau was an informal member of the group and later would do the choreography for Milhaud's composition Le bœuf sur le toit—a direct translation of the Brazilian song name. This ballet farce became very popular and Milhaud, joined by Georges Auric, and Arthur Rubinstein could often be heard playing a six-handed version of it at La gaya, a bar at 17, rue Duphot owned by Louis Moysès. The presence of Cocteau and his circle made the Gaya very popular and in December 1921, when Moysès moved his bar to rue Boissy d’Anglas, he named the new bar Le Bœuf sur le toit, probably to be sure that Milhaud, Cocteau, and their friends went with him. They did—and Le Bœuf was born. Over the years the bar became such an icon that the common belief in Paris was that Milhaud's ballet-farce had been named after the bar, which was the opposite of what actually happened.

== History ==
Le Bœuf sur le toit was a success from the day it opened. It quickly became the center of Paris cabaret society and reigned throughout the twenties. On opening night pianist Jean Wiéner, who Moysès had brought with him from the Gaya, played Gershwin tunes with Cocteau and Milhaud providing accompaniment on the drums. According to Maurice Sachs, the opening night audience included Pablo Picasso, René Clair, Sergei Diaghilev and Maurice Chevalier.

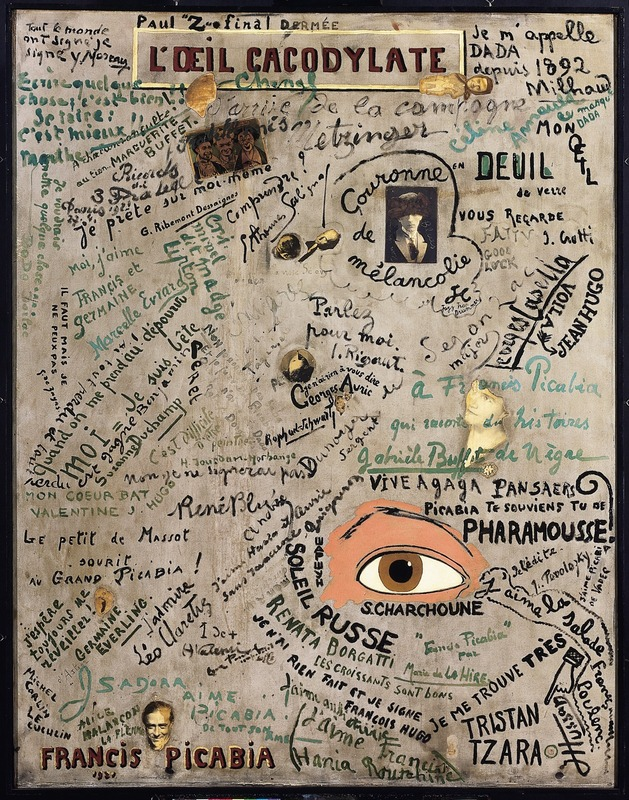
For many years Francis Picabia's painting L'Oeil Cacodylate hung over the bar in Le Bœuf

Artists of all kinds came to Le Bœuf. On the wall, reigning over the scene, was Francis Picabia's now famous Dada work L’Oeil Cacodylate (The Cacodylic Eye). But the bar was mainly about music. One could hear Jean Wiéner playing Bach, virtuoso pianist Clément Doucet playing Cole Porter, or Marianne Oswald singing the songs of Kurt Weill. Eugene McCown, recently arrived in Paris from his native Missouri, was hired to play jazz from 10 pm to 2 am. You could run into Stravinsky, Francis Poulenc, Catherine Sauvage, or Erik Satie. Frequent guests also included the young American composer Virgil Thomson and other classical musicians from Le Six. Jazz musicians from other Paris clubs would show up at Le Bœuf after hours and play long into the night—for Paris was above all the city of jazz. In France, the expression "faire un bœuf" is used by musicians to this day to mean "to have a jam session" and derives from the name of this cabaret.

In 1928, owner Louis Moysés was forced to move to a new location, and this was followed by more moves, always within the 8th arrondissement.

- In 1922 Le Bœuf sur le toit founded at 28 rue Boissy d'Anglas
- In 1928 moved to 33, rue Boissy d'Anglas
- In 1928 moved again to 26 rue de Penthièvre
- In 1936 moved to 41 bis avenue Pierre 1er de Serbie
- In 1941 moved to 34, de la rue du Colisée

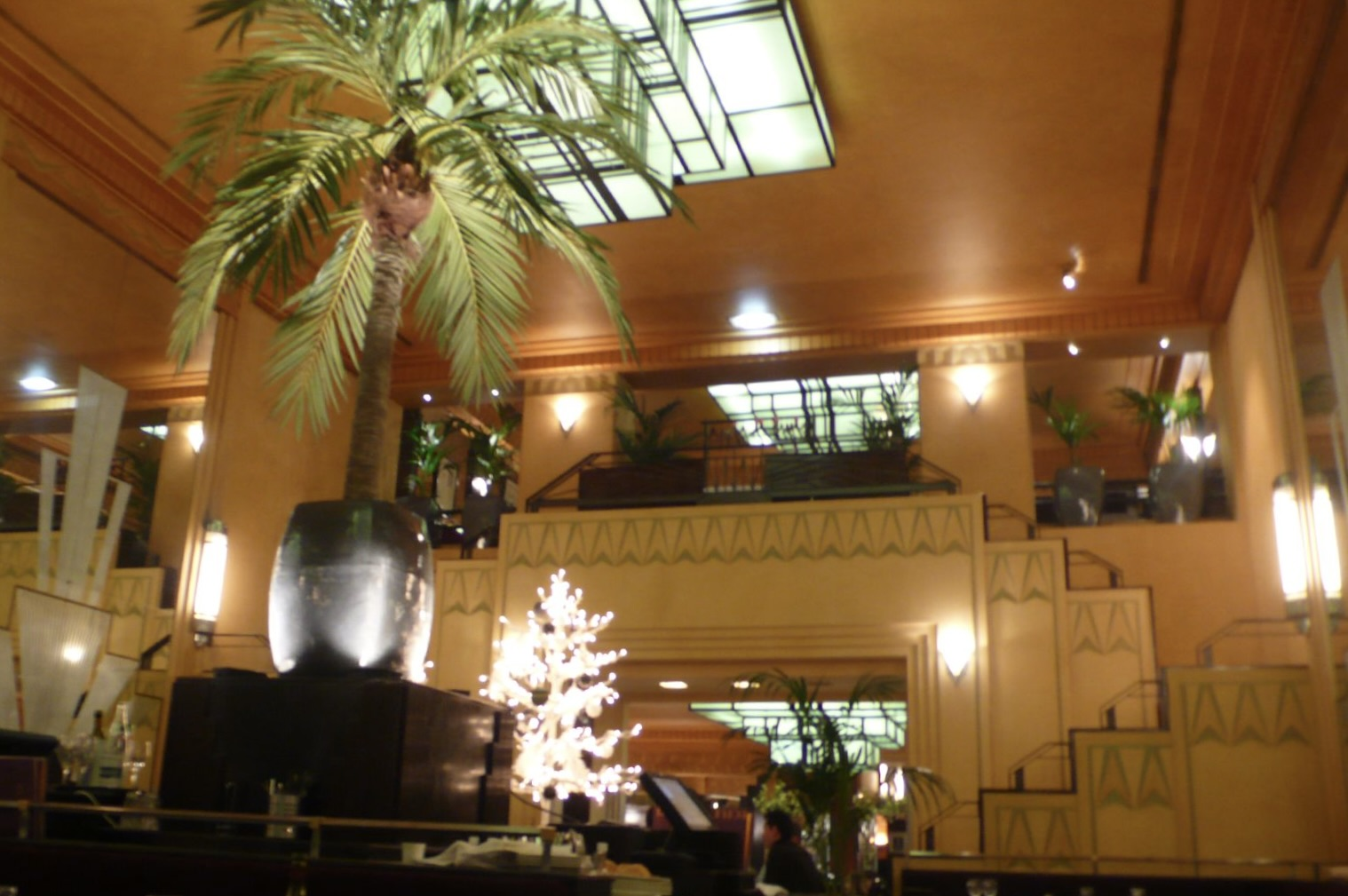
Interior of Le Bœuf sur le toit in 2007

The many relocations significantly altered the effervescent spirit of the original cabaret. Le Bœuf sur le toit exists as a restaurant to this day, but has lost much of its signature flair.

== Kristallnacht ==
In 1938 Nazi propagandists reacted furiously to the assassination of German diplomat Ernst vom Rath by Herschel Grynszpan, a young Jewish man; and this was used as a pretext for Kristallnacht. But according to historian Hans-Jürgen Döscher, the shooting was not politically motivated, as commonly believed, but the result of a homosexual love affair gone wrong. Döscher claimed that Grynszpan and Vom Rath had become intimate after they met in Le Bœuf sur le toit, which was a popular hangout for gay men at the time.

== The Second World War ==
Paul Richey of No. 1 Squadron, R.A.F., described a visit to Le Bœuf sur le toit during the Phoney War: '... we would stampede into a taxi and arrive with a roar at the Bœuf-sur-le-Toit, where we paid exhorbitant sums for the doubtful privilege of sitting in a smoky room drinking more champagne, only vaguely aware of the surrounding company of glamorous females, French Army officers, international pansies, crooks and spies. The pianist Jack Wilson would habitually bang out 'We're goin' ter hang out the washing on the Siegfried Line', first in French, then in English ...' The Bœuf sur le toit, like Maxim's, was still able to provide high quality restauration in 1939-40.

During the Occupation Le Bœuf sur le toit received somewhat less custom from German officers, unless they were gay, than many establishments because of its avant-garde and artistic/theatrical reputation. However, in 1942-3 Major Denis Rake, an SOE radio operator, worked at Le Bœuf sur le toit as a drag artist. Performing as he was for German visitors, he found this an effective cover. Indeed he even had an affair with a German staff officer called Max who came to Le Bœuf sur le toit in civilian clothes.

During the same period, Le Bœuf sur le toit was also frequented by members of the Zazou youth subculture.

== Famous patrons of and performers at Le Bœuf sur le toit ==
From the day it opened, Le Bœuf was the epicenter of the Paris of the Roaring Twenties and was always thronged by the beau monde and the cream of the avant-garde. People likely to be seen at Le Bœuf included:

- Louis Aragon
- Georges Auric
- Marcel Aymé
- Josephine Baker
- Barbette
- Jane Bathori
- Tristan Bernard
- Paul Bourget
- Constantin Brâncuși
- Georges Braque
- André Breton
- Albert Camus
- Georges Carpentier
- Blaise Cendrars
- Coco Chanel
- Charlie Chaplin
- Maurice Chevalier
- René Clair
- Paul Claudel
- Jean Cocteau
- Henri Collet
- André Derain
- Sergei Diaghilev
- Clément Doucet
- Louis Durey
- Léon-Paul Fargue
- Léo Ferré (after World War II)
- André Gide
- Ernest Hemingway
- Arthur Honegger
- Max Jacob
- Marcel Jouhandeau
- Frida Kahlo
- Marie Laurencin
- Eugene McCown
- Darius Milhaud
- Paul Morand
- Mistinguett
- Marianne Oswald
- Francis Picabia
- Pablo Picasso
- Francis Poulenc
- Jacques Prévert
- Yvonne Printemps
- Raymond Radiguet
- Maurice Ravel
- Pierre Reverdy
- Alfonso Reyes
- Arthur Rubinstein
- Erik Satie
- Catherine Sauvage
- Igor Stravinsky
- Germaine Tailleferre
- Virgil Thomson
- Tristan Tzara
- Jean Wiéner
