= Michèle Bernard =

French singer-songwriter

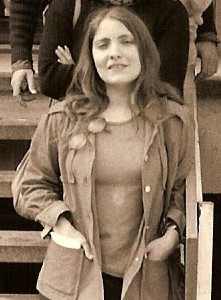
- Michèle Bernard

Background information
- Born: 26 October 1947; Lyon, France
- Genres: Chanson
- Occupation(s): Singer, songwriter
- Instrument(s): Vocals, accordion
- Years active: 1974–present
- Labels: EPM Musique
- Website: michelebernard.net

Michèle Bernard (French: [miʃɛl bɛʁnaʁ]; born 26 October 1947) is a French singer and songwriter.

== Discography ==
- 1988: Michèle Bernard en Public
- 1992: Des nuits noires de monde
- 1997: Nomade (Chansons pour les petits et les grands)
- 1997: Quand vous me rendrez visite
- 1999: Voler...
- 2002: Mes premiers vinyls
- 2002: Une fois qu'on s'est tout dit
- 2004: Poésies pour les enfants
- 2004: L'oiseau noir du champ fauve, cantate pour Louise Michel
- 2006: Le nez en l'air
- 2008: Piano Voix
- 2008: Monsieur je m'en fous
- 2010: Des nuits noires de monde Live
- 2012: Sens Dessus Dessous

== Awards ==
- Grand Prix musique jeune public ADAMI 2013
