= Marianne Oswald =

French singer and actress (1901-1985)

- Born: Sarah Alice Bloch; January 9, 1901; Sarreguemines, Moselle, Lorraine, Germany
- Died: February 25, 1985 (aged 84); Limeil-Brevannes, Val-de-Marne, France
- Occupations: singer, actress

Marianne Oswald (January 9, 1901 – February 25, 1985) was the stage name of Sarah Alice Bloch, a French singer and actress born in Sarreguemines in Alsace-Lorraine. She took this stage name from a character she much admired, the unhappy Oswald in the Ibsen play Ghosts. She was noted for her hoarse voice, heavy half-Lorraine, half-German accent, and for singing about unrequited love, despair, sadness, and death. She sang the songs of Kurt Weill and Bertolt Brecht. She was friends with Jean Cocteau, Jacques Prévert, François Mauriac, and Albert Camus. In fact, the text for one of her album covers was written by Camus. She was an inspiration for the composers Francis Poulenc and Arthur Honegger.

== Biography ==
Marianne Oswald's parents were Jewish immigrants, exiles from Poland. Both parents died young and she became an orphan in 1917 at the age of 16. Initially she was sent to a boarding school in Munich, but by 1920 she found her way to Berlin where she began singing in the thriving cabarets of the period. During this time, an operation to remove a goiter—she called it "having my throat cut"—left her with a permanent hoarse voice which would have a major, and not entirely negative, effect on her singing career.

In 1931, with the rise of the Nazi party, and the threat it posed—Oswald was after all Jewish—she was forced to emigrate to Paris where she forged a unique new style of French singing incorporating the techniques of German expressionism. She sang at the cabaret Le Boeuf sur le Toit (the ox on the roof), a tavern which had long welcomed the songs of the French avant-garde. She was one of the first to interpret The Threepenny Opera by Berthold Brecht and Kurt Weill, with lyrics adapted into French by André Mauprey, for instance singing La complainte de Mackie (a song English speakers know as Mack the Knife) and Pirate Jenny.

It was said that she had no voice, that she had an accent you could cut with a knife, that she was too skinny, that she was not beautiful, that her voice—by turns raw and tender—was bizarre and even shocking. It was all true. Moreover, she sang about depressing subjects—unrequited love, despair, death, and even suicide. And yet, her red hair, her intensity, and the uniqueness of her singing with its peculiar diction and spoken-sung style—in those days an innovation—earned her the nickname magnifique de Marianne la Rouge (the magnificent redheaded Marianne). Many years later, the French singer Barbara records in her memoirs her amazement when a friend introduced her to this artist "fierce, modern, desperate, staggering".

In June 1932 she made her first two recordings—with the recording company Salabert: En m'en foutant (In did not care) and Pour m'avoir dit je t'aime (I love you for telling me). She attracted the attention of Jean Bérard, president of Columbia Records France, and this led to her recording two songs written by Jean Tranchant, La Complainte de Kesoubah and Le Grand Étang. (Tranchant would later write the songs Appel and Sans repentir especially for her.) Then, in 1934, Jean Cocteau wrote for her Anna la bonne, a spoken song inspired by the sensational news story of the Papin sisters, two servants, who in 1933 senselessly massacred their employers, mother and daughter. Anna la bonne would later be the basis for a 1959 short film of the same name starring Oswald and directed by Claude Jutra. In March 1934 she recorded Le Jeu de massacre, with lyrics by Henri-Georges Clouzot and music by Maurice Yvain. In 1936 she recorded another Cocteau composition, La Dame de Monte-Carlo.

In 1934, when Oswald sang Jean Tranchant's composition appel (the summons), with its pacifist theme, she was booed off the stage by anti-semites in the audience. The poet and screenwriter Jacques Prévert immediately came to her defense, and this encounter was the beginning of a long and fertile collaboration between the poet and the singer.

Later in the summer of 1934, another shocking news story captured the attention of Jacques Prévert. Thirty children had escaped from a prison in Belle-Ile-en-Mer where they had been tormented by sadistic guards. A reward of twenty francs per child was offered to help recapture the miscreants, and ordinary citizens actually joined in the hunt! Prévert responded by writing a poem, La chasse à l'enfant (The hunt for the child), which was set to music by Joseph Kosma, and recorded by Marianne Oswald in October 1936. Prévert also intended to make the story into a movie, but this never came to pass.

In 1935 Oswald married a Monsieur Colin, a Catholic-born Frenchman. But their union did not survive the war and the racist laws characteristic of the period.

In December 1937, the exclusive contract with Columbia ended with Oswald recording one final song written by Prévert and Kosma, The sounds of the night.

Until 1939 Marianne Oswald could be heard at the Le Boeuf sur le Toit, at the Alcazar, at Théâtre des Deux Ânes, and at Bobino. In 1939, she went into exile in the United States where she performed in nightclubs and on radio, and was sponsored by men such as Malcolm Cowley, John Erskine, and Langston Hughes. In 1942 she appeared with the accordionist John Serry Sr. in a performance of works by the poets Carl Sandburg and Archibald MacLeish at New York City's Town Hall. Critics praised her performance as "intriguing and nuanced". While in the United States, she published a memoir in English, One small voice, in 1945. All together, she remained in America for almost seven years.

In 1946 she returned to France. During her six years of exile in America, the taste of the Parisian audience had changed. Marianne Oswald's outré style was no longer welcome in the cabarets. She turned to radio and was the subject of a series of programs presented by Cocteau, Camus, Seghers, Ribemont-Dessaignes, Gaston Bonheur, and television producer/director Jean Nohain. Titled The Return of Marianne Oswald, she sang and recited the works of Apollinaire, Paul Éluard, and, of course, Prévert.

In 1948 she published an expanded version of her memoirs in French under the title Je n'ai pas appris à vivre (I have not learned to live), with a preface by Jacques Prevert.

External videos
- Photograph of Marianne Oswald from the film The Lovers of Verona in 1949; Here on Getty Images

In 1938 Marianne Oswald began her acting career with Le Petit chose directed by Maurice Cloche. All together she appeared in seven films between 1938 and 1958. She was especially noted for her performance in the 1949 film Les amants de Vérone (The Lovers of Verona), directed by André Cayatte and written by Cayatte and Jacques Prévert. She was a sometimes screenwriter, writing the screenplay for La première nuit in 1958, and a television short, Bouquet de femmes in 1960. Working with Remo Forlani, she also produced television programs for children, in particular, Terre des Enfants (Children of Earth).

For over thirty years Marianne Oswald lived in a room at the famous Hôtel Lutetia on the Left Bank in Paris, a hotel which ironically had served as the headquarters of the Gestapo during the war. When she died in 1985 at the age of 84, at the hospital in Limeil-Brevannes in the Val-de-Marne, few people attended the funeral. Six years later, in June 1991, her remains were returned to her hometown of Sarreguemines. A plaque with her name was affixed to the corner of Church Street and Rue de Verdun, at the very spot occupied by the building in which she had been born, and which had been destroyed during the war.

== Tributes ==
- She sings neither well nor ill. Let specialists define her talent. The important thing is that she sings as a torch burns. She is alternately the geranium of the suburbs, the scar of crime, the lantern of the brothel and the whistle of the police. —Jean Cocteau
- She sings of reality, however it goes beyond reality, she does not pretend to translate, she torments the human soul, and it cuts like a knife. (Elle chante des chansons réalistes, cependant elle dépasse le réalisme, elle ne fait pas semblant, elle transpose, elle taraude l'âme humaine, elle dessine au burin.) —Louis Leon Martin
- I suppose that it is this mighty crimson fire, this flare, this lighthouse, a beacon which infuses this ember fury, this dispenser of acetylene gas and magnesium flame, which explains the effectiveness of this singer, this mime that repels many, but who is nonetheless much needed. (Je suppose que c'est cette puissance rouge d'incendie, de mégot, de torche, de phare, de fanal, qui l'habite, cet acharnement de braise, cette haleur de gaz d'acétylène, de magnésium et de lampe à souder, qui forment l'efficacité de cette chanteuse, de cette mime que bien des esprits repoussent, mais qui s'impose malgré tout.) —Jean Cocteau

== Filmography ==
- 1938: The Little Thing (directed by Maurice Cloche) – La camarade
- 1949: The Lovers Of Verona (directed by André Cayatte) – Laetitia
- 1953: Le Guérisseur (directed by Yves Ciampi) – La guérisseuse Lucie
- 1958: The Adventures of Remi (directed by André Michel) – Mrs. Emily Driscoll
- 1958: Anna la bonne (short) (directed by Harry Kümel) – Anna
- 1956: The Hunchback of Notre Dame (directed by Jean Delannoy)
- 1958: Les Amants de Montparnasse (directed by Jacques Becker & Max Ophüls)

== Television ==
- Marianne Oswald, une flamme, un cri: a musical/biographical documentary directed by Yannick Delhaye, broadcast on France 3 Lorraine in 2014.

== Discography ==
- L’Art de Marianne Oswald [1932-1937], EPM 982272 (1991).
- Kurt Weill in Paris, Assai, 2000.

== Bibliography ==
- Marianne Oswald (1945). One small voice. New York & London: Whittlesey House. OCLC 1375818.
- Marianne Oswald; Jacques Prévert (1948). Je n'ai pas appris à vivre. Paris: Domat. OCLC 31450141.
- Lucienne Mazenod (1960). Les Femmes célèbres, pp. 658–659. Paris: L. Mazenod. OCLC 460342272.
- Colette Godard, Marianne Oswald. Compilation, Le Monde, June 18, 1992, p. 38.
