= René Crevel =

French surrealist writer

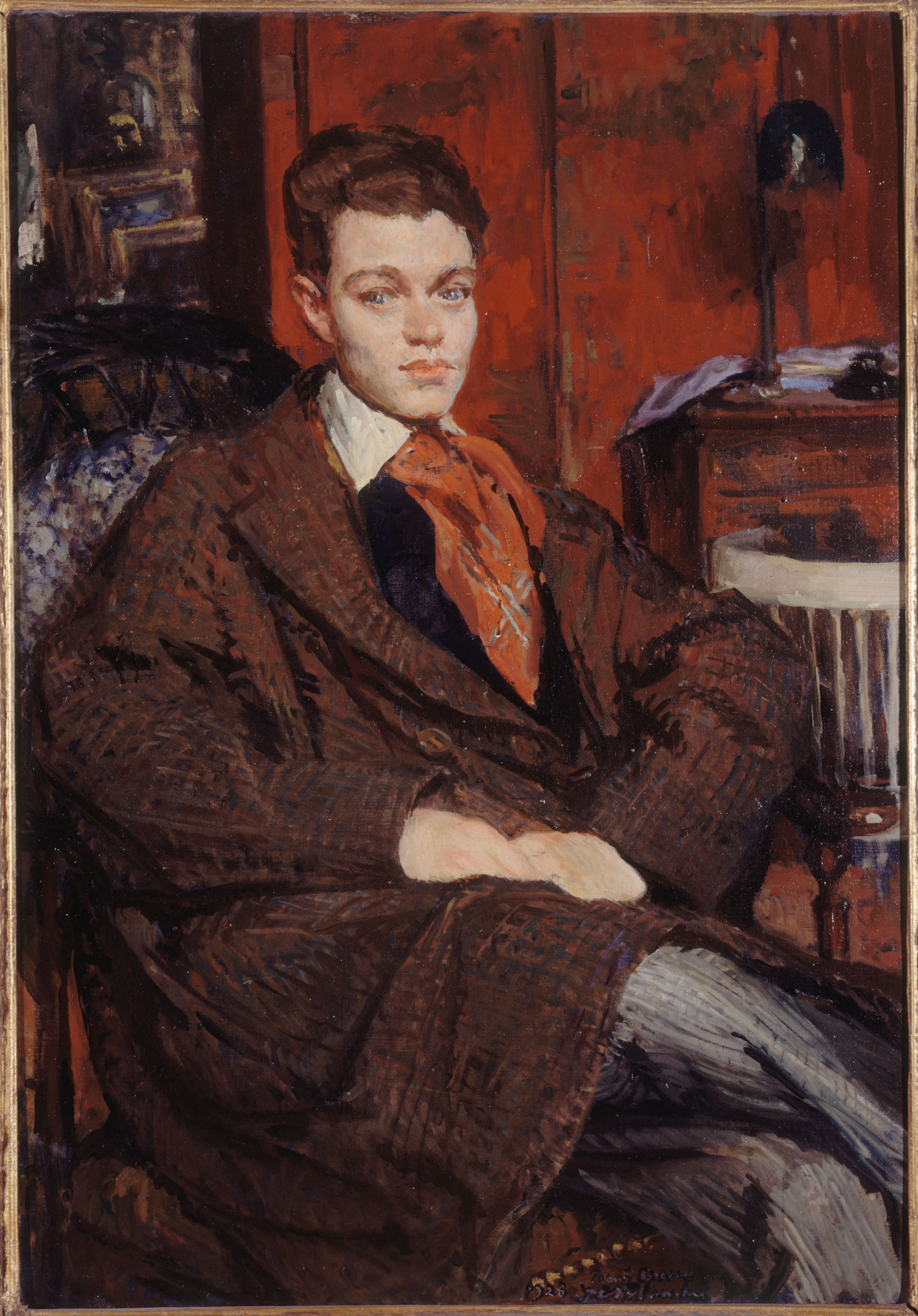
- Born: 10 August 1900; Paris, France
- Died: 18 June 1935 (aged 34); Paris, France

René Crevel (French: [kʁəvɛl]; 10 August 1900 – 18 June 1935) was a French writer involved with the surrealist movement.

== Life ==
Crevel was born in Paris to a family of Parisian bourgeoisie. He had a traumatic religious upbringing. At the age of fourteen, his father committed suicide by hanging himself.

Crevel studied literature and law at the University of Paris. He met Tristan Tzara and joined the Dada movement as early as 1923 (Crevel would play the "Eye" character in Tzara's play Le Coeur à Barbe, in July 1923), then got closer to André Breton and the Surrealists. During the 1923/1924 winter, a love affair between Crevel and American artist Eugene McCown began. Through McCown, Crevel mingled with a chic bohemian crowd and got to know Nancy Cunard, F. Scott Fitzgerald, Caresse and Harry Crosby, and others.

From 1924, Crevel wrote novels such as Détours and Mon Corps et moi ("My Body and Me") where he would extensively write about his fears, his revolt and his feeling of malaise. In 1926 was published La Mort difficile ("Difficult Death"), a novel where he depicts his lover McCown as "Arthur Bruggle". The publication ended their love affair, though Crevel would be close to McCown till the end of his life.

Also in 1924, he was diagnosed with tuberculosis which caused him to frequently leave Paris for sanatoriums, especially in Switzerland. The 1929 exile of Leon Trotsky persuaded him to rejoin the surrealists. Remaining faithful to Breton, he struggled to bring communists and surrealists closer together. In 1928, during a short stay in Berlin, he met Carl Sternheim's daughter, Dorothea, with whom he fell in love. Much of Crevel's work deals with his involvement as a communist and his inner turmoil at being bisexual.

Crevel killed himself by turning on the gas on his kitchen stove the night of 18 June 1935—exactly the same way as he described in his first published book—several weeks before his 35th birthday. There were at least two direct reasons: (1) There was a conflict between Breton and Ilya Ehrenburg during the first "International Congress of Writers for the Defense of Culture" which opened in Paris in June 1935. Breton, who, like all fellow surrealists, had been insulted by Ehrenburg in a pamphlet which said—among other things—that surrealists were pederasts, slapped Ehrenburg several times on the street, which led to surrealists being expelled from the Congress. Crevel, who, according to Salvador Dalí, was "the only serious communist among surrealists", spent a whole day trying to persuade the other delegates to allow surrealists back, but he was not successful and left the Congress at 11:00 pm, totally exhausted. Crevel reportedly had learned that he suffered from renal tuberculosis upon leaving the Congress. He left a note which read "Please cremate my body. Loathing."

When Breton included the question "Suicide: Is It a Solution?" in the first issue of La Révolution surréaliste in 1925, Crevel was one of those who answered "Yes". He wrote "A solution that is obviously the fairest and most definitive of them all, the solution of suicide".

== Publications ==
Crevel's work on Paul Klee (1930)

=== Original French ===
- Détours (1924)
- Mon Corps et moi (1925)
- La Mort difficile (1926)
- Babylone (1927)
- L'Esprit contre la raison (1928)
- Êtes-vous fous? (1929)
- Le Clavecin de Diderot (1932)
- Les Pieds dans le plat (1933)
- Le Roman cassé et derniers écrits (1934–1935)

=== English translations ===
- My Body and I (translation of Mon Corps et Moi; Archipelago Books, 2005)
- Babylon (translation of Babylone), translated by Kay Boyle, North Point Press, 1985, ISBN 0-86547-191-6; Sun and Moon Press, 1996)
- Putting My Foot in It (translation of Les Pieds dans le plat; Dalkey Archive Press, 1994)
- Difficult Death (translation of La Mort difficile; Farrar, Straus and Giroux, 1986)
- 1830 (Elysium Press, 1996)
- The Noble Mannequin Seeks and Finds her Skin; 1934 (translation from French in The Surrealism Reader); Tate Publishing 2015, ISBN 9781854376688
- Are You All Crazy? (translation of Êtes-vous fous?; Snuggly Books, 2023)
- Scattered Leaves (translation of Feuilles Eparses; Incunabula Books 2024) ISBN 978-1-4452-4205-7
