= Hélène Martin =

French singer-songwriter (1928–2021)

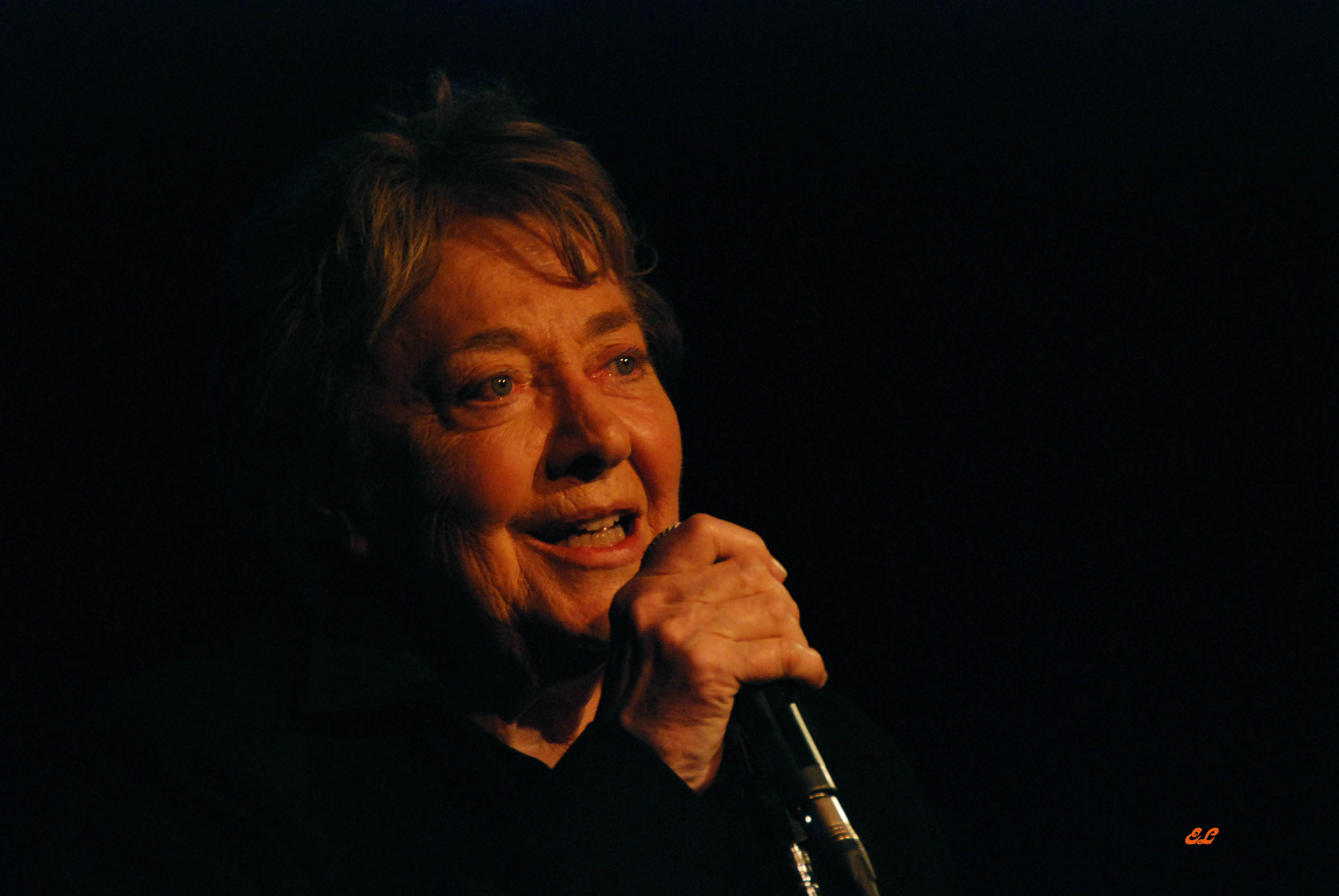
- Hélène Martin

Background information
- Born: 10 December 1928; Paris, France
- Died: 21 February 2021 (aged 92); Cordemais, France
- Genres: Chanson
- Occupation(s): Singer, songwriter
- Instrument: Vocals
- Years active: 1956–2009
- Labels: Cavalier; EPM Musique; Universal
- Website: www.helene-martin.com

Hélène Martin (French: [elɛn maʁtɛ̃]; 10 December 1928 – 21 February 2021) was a French singer-songwriter.

== Biography ==
Born in Paris, Martin was daughter of a university professor (Sciences Po), and started singing in cabarets in the 1950s. In 1962, she recorded poems by Jean Genet who encouraged her. Jean Vilar asked her to stage a show based on poems by René Char for the Festival d'Avignon, interpreted by her and Roger Blin, Francesca Solleville, Bachir Touré (1966). She was a friend of many poets and writers, including Louis Aragon and Jean Giono. Surrealist poet Philippe Soupault published a book on her and her work.

She created a TV series dedicated to poetry, Plain-Chant (1972). She also directed a TV movie after Jean Giono's novel Jean le Bleu (1979). In 2009, aged 81, she gave a last performance at the Théâtre des Bouffes du Nord.

== Discography ==
- 1996: Hélène Martin chante les poètes, EPM Musique. Songs recorded 1962–1983, with Laurent Terzieff.
- 2000: La Douceur du bagne, book & CD, EPM/Le Castor astral
- 2002: Le Condamné à mort, sung by Marc Ogeret, music Hélène Martin, recorded 1970, EPM "poètes et chansons".
- 2003: Lucienne Desnoues, reissue, EPM "poètes et chansons"
- 2006: Jean Genet, Un chant d'amour, Buda Musique, with Richard Armstrong.
- 2006: Chansons pour les enfants, EPM Musique, 2006.
- 2006: Va savoir, EPM
- 2007: Pablo Neruda, de la poésie à la lutte. Includes L'Elégie à Pablo Neruda sung by Hélène Martin.
- 2007: Terres mutilées followed by Dans mon pays, poems by René Char, 1968, reissue, EPM "Poésie".
- 2008: Journal d'une voix, Des femmes-Antoinette Fouque.
- 2009-2010: Voyage en Hélénie, 13-CD case.

== Awards ==
- 1961: Grand Prix du Disque
- 1967: Prix de l'Humour noir.
- 2009: Prix Jacques Douai
