= Catherine Sauvage =

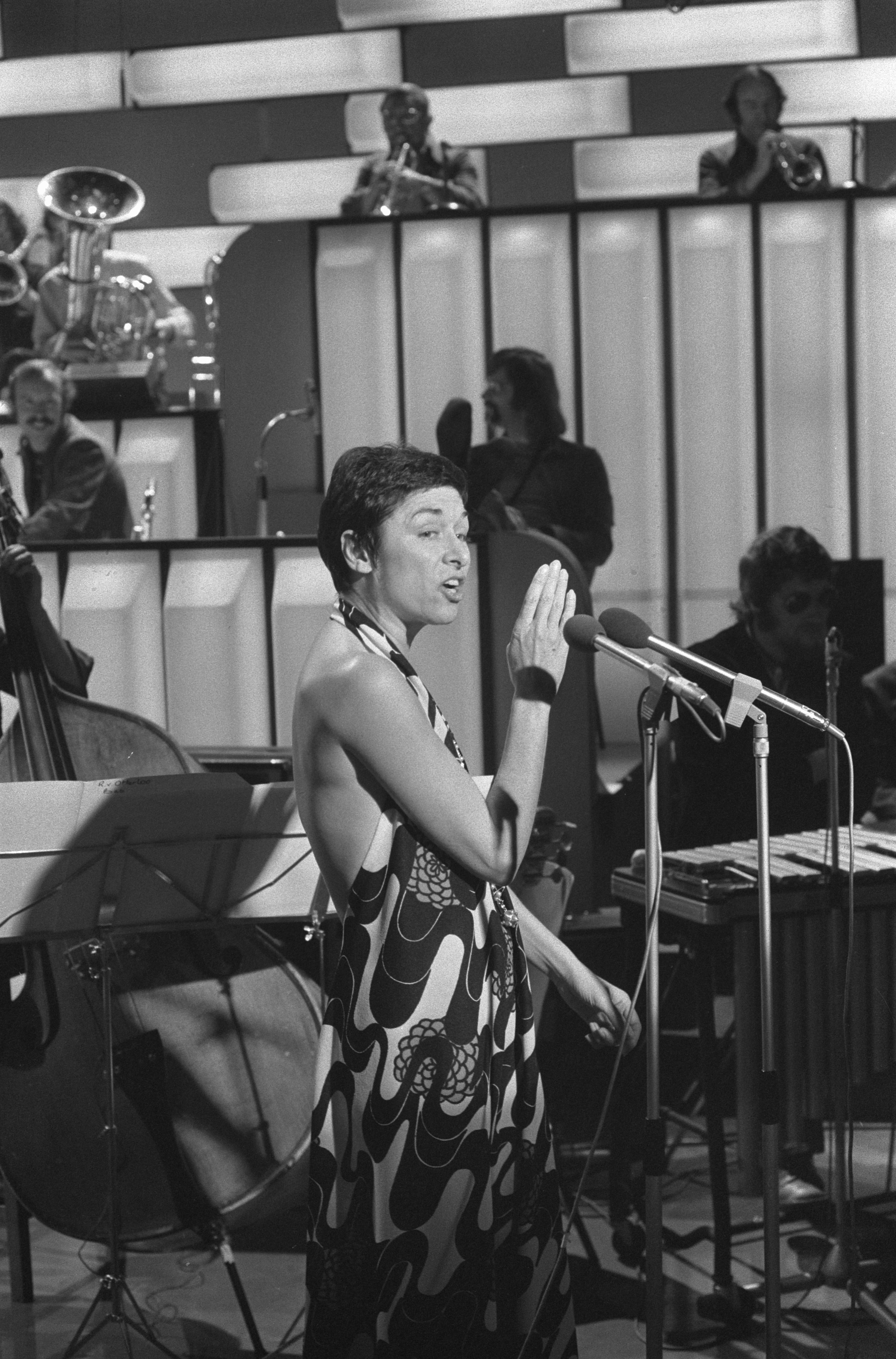
- Catherine Sauvage performing in a TV show, 1974

Background information
- Born: Marcelle Jeanine Saunier; 26 May 1929; Nancy, France
- Died: 20 March 1998 (aged 68) Bry-sur-Marne, Val-de-Marne, France
- Genres: Chanson
- Occupations: singer actress
- Years active: 1946–94
- Label: Philips

Catherine Sauvage (French pronunciation: [katʁin sovaʒ]; 26 May 1929 – 20 March 1998) was a French singer and actress.

== Early life ==
Born Marcelle Jeanine Saunier in Nancy, France, she moved with her family in 1940 to the Free Zone in Annecy. After high school, she turned to the theater, performing under the name Janine Saulnier. After eight years of studying piano, singing and drama, in 1950 she met Léo Ferré and fell in love with his songs. In 1952 she sang his "Paris canaille", which became a hit. In 1954, she won the "Grand Prix du Disque", a famous French award, for the song "L'Homme", again by Ferré. On tour in Canada, she made the acquaintance of Gilles Vigneault, who wrote "Mon Pays, Le Corbeau, la Manikoutai" for her.

== Professional career ==
Arriving in Paris, she adopted the surname Sauvage, borrowed from a childhood friend, and, began studying drama:

I did my apprenticeship with Jean-Louis Barrault, with John Vilar, Roger Blin, Marcel Marceau. [...] The chance of life allowed me to be presented to Moyses, who was the director of the cabaret Le Boeuf sur le Toit. I sang him some stuff like that, recited two or three poems. As a result, Moyses hired me the next day. I used a directory with songs including Marianne Oswald. I stayed two months at the Boeuf sur le Toit --- afterwards, I sang at the Quod Libet, a nightclub on 3 rue des Prés-At-Clerics.

She also performed at the cabarets L'Arlequin at 131 bis, boulevard Saint-Germain, then at L'Écluse at 15, Quai des Grands Augustins, in the 6th arrondissement.

She met Léo Ferré, whom she helped in bringing recognition to his music: "It was the meeting of my life. As a happiness never comes alone, they say, Jacques Canetti came to hear me a beautiful evening. He was always looking for artists for the record company of which he was the artistic director, as well as for [the concert hall] Les Trois Baudets that he had established."

Jacques Canetti hired her in 1953 and 1954 to work at Les Trois Baudets. "So I visited that cabaret on Rue Coustou for two years. Later I was featured at the Olympia, and received a grand prize for record L'Homme with Léo Ferré."

She died in 1998, aged 68, in Bry-sur-Marne, Val-de-Marne.

== Performance style ==
She has always given preference to poetry set to music. Léo Ferré and Gilles Vigneault have said they considered Sauvage their best performer. Aragon, one of her favorite poets, wrote about her: "And suddenly with her voice, like a gift, every word makes complete sense."

== Discography ==
=== Studio albums ===
- 1954: Catherine Sauvage chante ses derniers succès
- 1954: Catherine Sauvage chante Léo Ferré
- 1956: Ouvert la nuit
- 1961: Catherine Sauvage chante Léo Ferré - volume 1
- 1961: Catherine Sauvage chante Léo Ferré - volume 2
- 1961: Catherine Sauvage chante Louis Aragon
- 1964: Catherine Sauvage chante Kurt Weill
- 1964: Chansons d'amour et de tendresse, chansons des amours déchirantes
- 1966: Chansons françaises du Canada
- 1969: Le Miroir aux alouettes
- 1969: Chansons libertines
- 1970: Larguez les amarres
- 1971: Avec le temps
- 1973: J'ai tout vu, tout connu
- 1992: Colette: Dialogues de bêtes
- 1992: Démons et merveilles (Catherine Sauvage chante Prévert)

=== Live albums ===
- 1961: Chansons de cœur… chansons de tête
- 1968: Le Bonheur : Catherine Sauvage à Bobino 1968
- 1979: 25 ans de chansons de Léo Ferré - Volume 1
- 1979: 25 ans de chansons de Léo Ferré - Volume 2
- 1983: Récital à Tokyo

=== Compilations ===
- 2009: Le Siècle d'or : Toi qui disais, Le Chant du Monde (2 CD)
- 2011: Catherine Sauvage : Anthologie 1951-1959, Frémeaux & Associés (2 CD).

== Filmography ==
- 1956: Paris Mob
- 1966: Two Hours to Kill
- 1983: The Bride Who Came from the Cold
- 1983: Julien Fontanes, magistrat (1 Episode)
- 1988: The Shop on Main Street

== Theatre ==
- 1954: The Good Woman of Szechwan by Bertolt Brecht, directed by Roger Planchon, Festival of Lyon, Lyon Comedy Theatre
- 1956: St. Joan by Bernard Shaw, in French, directed by Gabriel Monnet, open air production August 1956, Chateau of Annecy.
- 1958: The Good Woman of Szechwan by Bertolt Brecht, directed by Roger Planchon, Theatre de la Cite Villeurbanne
- 1962: Frank V by Friedrich Dürrenmatt, directed by Claude Regy and André Barsacq, Theatre Workshop
- 1963: Divine Lyrics by Ramón María del Valle-Inclán, directed by Roger Blin, the Odeon Theatre
- 1977: The Night of the Iguana by Tennessee Williams, directed by Andreas Voutsinas, Bouffes North
