= Jean Vasca =

- Born: Jean Georges Stievenard; September 25, 1940 (age 86); Bressuire
- Died: December 21, 2016 (aged 76); Rivières, Gard
- Occupation: singer-songwriter
- Years active: 1964-2015
- Notable work: L'Ange exterminateur, Rêve ou meurs

Jean Vasca (Jean Georges Stievenard, 25 September 1940 – 21 December 2016) was a French singer-songwriter.

== Biography ==
Jean Vasca was born in Bressuire. He started singing songs by Jean Ferrat, Léo Ferré or Georges Brassens and his owns songs in the 1960s.

He released his first LP in 1964, with arrangements by Jacques Malbet and Barthélémy Rosso.

Through poet Luc Bérimont, he met his friends with whom he formed "the band of 5": Jacques Bertin, Jean-Max Brua, Gilles Elbaz, Jean-Luc Juvin.

In 1979, De doute et d'envol was awarded a Grand Prix du Disque by the Académie Charles Cros.

He also published several books.

He died in his sleep, aged 76, in Rivières, Gard, in 2016.

== Discography ==
- 1964: Les Routes
- 1965: Chanson 4 étoiles
- 1968: L'Ange exterminateur
- 1970: Vivre en flèche
- 1974: Un chant
- 1975: Midi
- 1976: Rêve ou meurs
- 1977: Célébrations
- 1978: Un chant... (new recording)
- 1979: De doute et d'envol
- 1981: Matinale
- 1984: Désespérément la vie
- 1986: Le Grand Sortir
- 1988: L’Ogre
- 1990: Ouvert la nuit
- 1993: De révolte et d’amour
- 1994: L’Atelier de l’été
- 1996: En attendant les orages
- 1997: La Machine imprévisible
- 1999: Le Fou sacré
- 2001: Serviteur
- 2003 : Le Meilleur du pire
- 2007: Un aller simple pour Mars
- 2010: L'Incertitude, l'Insoumission... et les Étoiles
- 2013: L'Auberge du temps perdu
- 2015 : Saluts
- 2018: Chansons 1967-1986 (compilation album)

== Books ==
- Jaillir, PJO, 1969
- L'Écarlate et l'Outremer, PJO, 1973
- Chansons, suivi de Succursales du Soleil, Ipomée (dessins de Jacques OUDOT), 1978
- Je vis j'écris je chante, Ipomée, 1981
- Le Cri, le Chant, Le Cherche-Midi, 1986
- Solos solaires, Le Cherche-Midi, 1992
- L'Été d'être, Le Cherche-Midi, 2002
- La Concordance des chants, intégrale poèmes et chansons 1964–2014, Éditions Jean Vasca, 2014
