= Francesca Solleville =

French singer

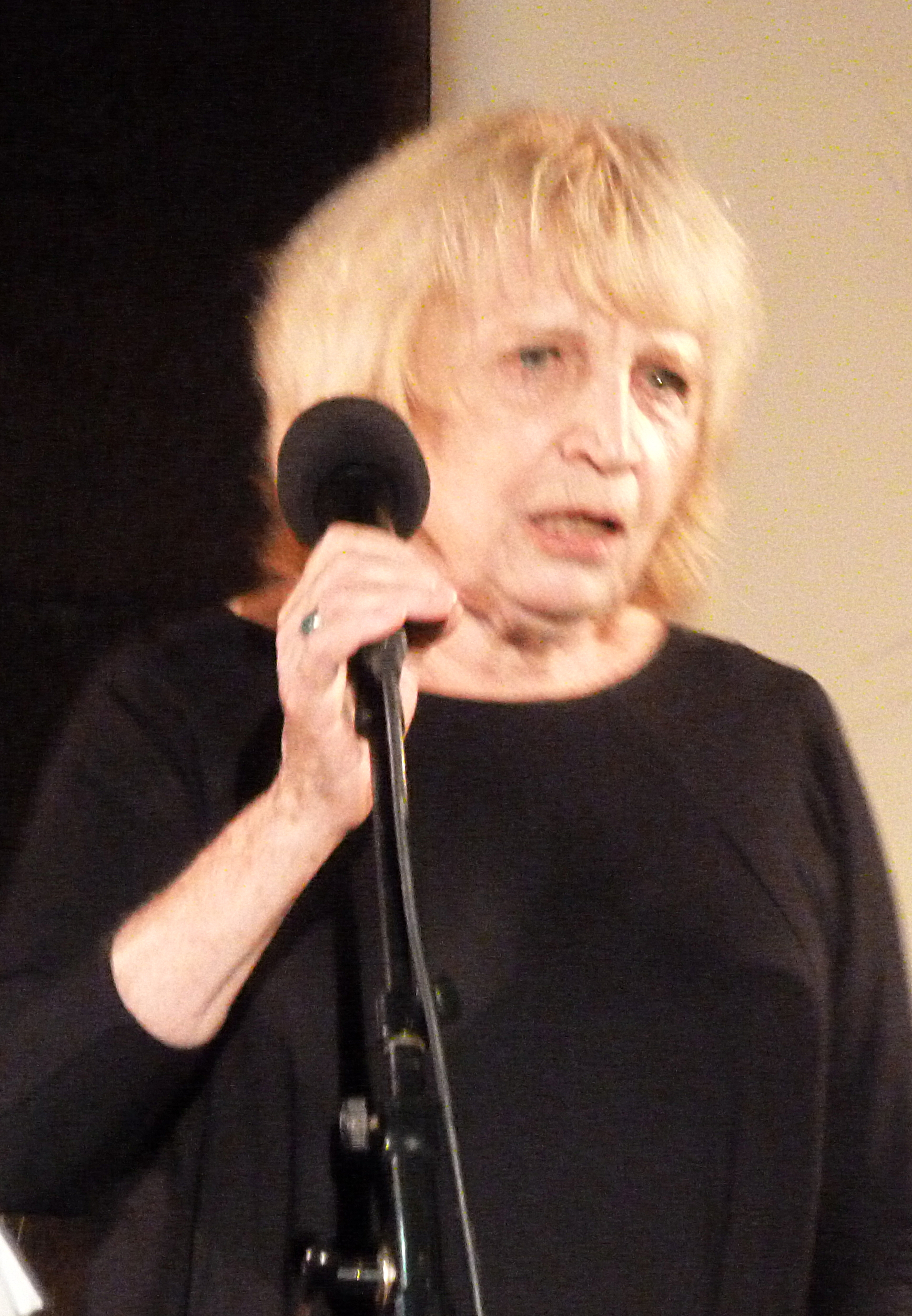
- Francesca Solleville

Background information
- Born: 2 March 1932 (age 94); Périgueux, Dordogne, France
- Genres: Chanson
- Years active: 1958–present

Francesca Solleville (born 2 March 1932, Périgueux) is a French singer. She lives in Malakoff (Hauts-de-Seine). She is the granddaughter of the founder of the Italian League for the Rights of Man. She is married to the painter Louis Loyzeau de Grandmaison.

== Biography ==
Francesca Solleville was born in Périgueux (Dordogne) to a Gascon father and Italian mother. At home, her mother played piano but Francesca was passionate for French literature while learning traditional songs (Schubert, Debussy...). In Paris, she studied humanities at the Sorbonne where she obtained a licentiate, and studied under the singer Marya Freud. She sang in the choirs of Radio France.

From 1958 Solleville gave up lyrical songs to perform her preferred composers in the cabarets of the Rive-Gauche of Paris. Influenced by Germaine Montéro and encouraged by Léo Ferré, she was directed by Jacques Douai to the record company Boîte à musique. There she recorded her first 45 rpm single in 1959 : Francesca Solleville chante Aragon and Mac Orlan.

She sang in numerous cabarets: at l'Écluse, where she sang with Barbara, at La Contrescarpe where Elsa Triolet and Louis Aragon came to hear her sing, at La Colombe where she met Pierre Perret and at Port du Salut (cabaret) where Christine Sèvres, Jacques Debronckart, Maurice Fanon, Pia Colombo and Pierre Louki also sang. In 1959, at la Mutualité, she sang two songs by Louis Aragon (La rose du premier de l'an and Un homme passe sous la fenêtre et chante). Also in 1959, she took part in collective recordings (chansons enfantines as a 45 rpm, chansons d'enfants as a 33⅓ rpm 10"), and she dedicated her first 45 rpm to Aragon and Pierre Mac Orlan.

In 1960, for her second 45 rpm, she sang the works of Luc Bérimont, Aragon et Ferré. In 1961, she sang Mac Orlan for a new 45 rpm.

In May 1962, Solleville released her first 10" album, intitulé Récital n°1, where she sange the poets Paul Fort (La Marine, set to music by Georges Brassens), Charles Baudelaire, Louis Aragon and Jean Ferrat (J'entends, j'entends).

In the 1960s, she recorded the songs of Hélène Martin, Georges Coulonges, Yani Spanos, Philippe-Gérard, Serge Rezvani, and the poems of Guillaume Apollinaire and Jean Genet. She sang in the film Dragées au poivre (1963). In 1964, she received the Grand Prix of the Académie Charles-Cros for her Récital n°2 of 1963.

She confirmed her role as a singer of activist songs against Nazism, Francoism and the Vietnam War. Equally, she supported the workers' cause (Le Chant des ouvriers). In 1971, she recorded with Marcel Mouloudji and Armand Mestral La Commune en chantant, a homage to 100 years of the Paris Commune. In 1975, she released Chants d'exil et de lutte based on the texts of Pablo Neruda. In 1988, she celebrated the bicentenary of the French Revolution with Musique, citoyennes !. Allain Leprest wrote the words of her album Al Dente (1994). In 2004, she published her autobiography, A piena voce, written with the collaboration of Marc Legras. In 2009, she celebrated 50 years as a singer. Véronique Sauger's book, Portraits croisés, Francesca Solleville, Allain Leprest (Ed. Les points sur les i) was published in December 2009.

== Discography ==
- 1959 Chansons enfantines – 45 rpm (collective disc)
- 1959 Chansons d'enfants – 10" (collective disc)
- 1959 Francesca Solleville chante Aragon et Mac Orlan – 45 rpm
- 1960 Francesca Solleville chante Aragon, Bérimont, Ferré – 45 rpm
- 1961 Francesca Solleville chante Mac Orlan n°4 – 45 rpm
- 1961 Francesca Solleville n° 3 – 45 rpm
- 1962 Récital n°1 – 33 1/3 rpm
- 1962 Made in France – 25 cm
- 1963 Récital n°2 – 33 1/3 rpm – Grand prix de l'Académie Charles Cros 1964
- 1963 Dragée au poivre – 33 1/3 rpm (B.O.F., collective disc)
- 1963 Vingt ans – 45 tours
- 1963 Aujourd'hui les femmes – 33 1/3 rpm
- 1964 Nuit et Brouillard – 45 rpm
- 1964 Paris-Cayenne – 45 rpm
- 1965 Récital n°3 – 33 1/3 rpm
- 1966 Récital n°4 – 33 1/3 rpm
- 1966 La petite juive – 45 rpm
- 1966 Les tuileries – 45 rpm
- 1967 Chansons rive gauche – 33 1/3 rpm (collective album)
- 1967 La légende des Saintes Maries de la Mer – 45 rpm
- 1968 La gloire – La fine fleur n°5 – 33 1/3 rpm
- 1968 Terres mutilées – René Char/Hélène Martin – 33 rpm
- 1968 Et je t'appelle – 45 rpm
- 1969 Récital n°6 – 33 1/3 rpm
- 1969 Francesca Solleville chante Paul Eluard – 45 rpm
- 1970 Mouloudji et Francesca Solleville chantent Aristide Bruant – 33 1/3 rpm
- 1970 Je t'aime – 45 rpm
- 1971 Francesca Solleville chante Louis Aragon – 33 1/3 rpm
- 1971 La commune en chantant – 33 1/3 rpm (collective album)
- 1971 Naissance de Saint-Germain-des-Prés – 33 1/3 rpm (collective album)
- 1972 Je suis ainsi – 45 rpm
- 1972 Francesca Solleville chante la violence et l'espoir – 33 1/3 rpm
- 1972 Poèmes vietnamiens chantés par Francesca Solleville – 33 1/3 rpm
- 1972 Ballades et complaintes syndicalistes - Le chant des ouvriers – double 33 1/3 rpm (collective album)
- 1974 Le visage de l'homme – 33 1/3 rpm
- 1974 Demande aux femmes – 45 rpm
- 1975 Aujourd'hui les femmes – 33 1/3 rpm
- 1975 Chants d'exil et de lutte – 33 1/3 rpm (collective album)
- 1975 Paris populi – 33 1/3 rpm (collective album)
- 1977 Chant pour les enfants du Chili – 33 1/3 rpm (collective album)
- 1977 Francesca Solleville 77 – 33 1/3 rpm
- 1980 L'émotion – 33 1/3 rpm
- 1983 La révolte des Canuts – 33 1/3 rpm (collective album)
- 1983 Francesca Solleville 83 – 33 1/3 rpm
- 1989 Musique, citoyennes ! – 33 1/3 rpm disc and CD
- 1990 Je suis ainsi – CD
- 1991 participation in CD Inédits 91 by Colette Magny (interpretation of Les chants des hommes)
- 1994 Francesca Solleville chante Allain Leprest – CD
- 1996 Al dente – enregistrement du spectacle – CD
- 1997 Chansons de poètes : Louis Aragon, anthologie de la chanson française – collective CD
- 2000 Grand frère, petit frère – CD
- 2001 En tournée au Japon – CD
- 2003 On s'ra jamais vieux – CD
- 2003 Hommage aux grands de la chanson – collective CD set (interpretation of 3 songs)
- 2005 Les grands poètes & la chanson française – collective CD set (interpretation of 9 songs)
- 2005 Le cri du peuple – collective CD
- 2007 Donnez-moi la phrase... – CD
- 2007 participation in the CD René Char – Terres mutilées & Dans mon pays by Hélène Martin
- 2009 Je déménage – CD
- 2009 Chez Leprest. Vol.2 (interpretation of Je ne te salue pas by Allain Leprest) – collective CD
- 2010 Francesca Solleville venge la vie 1959–1983 – set of 5 CDs

== Theatre ==
- 1964 Le Trèfle fleuri by Rafael Alberti, directed by Pierre Debauche, Théâtre Daniel Sorano Vincennes

== Bibliography ==
- Marc Legras, Francesca Solleville, Jean Ferrat: Francesca Solleville : a piena voce – Christian Pirot Editeur – 2004
- Véronique Sauger: Portraits croisés Francesca Solleville – Allain Leprest – Paris, Les points sur les i – 2009
