= Marc Ogeret =

French singer (1932–2018)

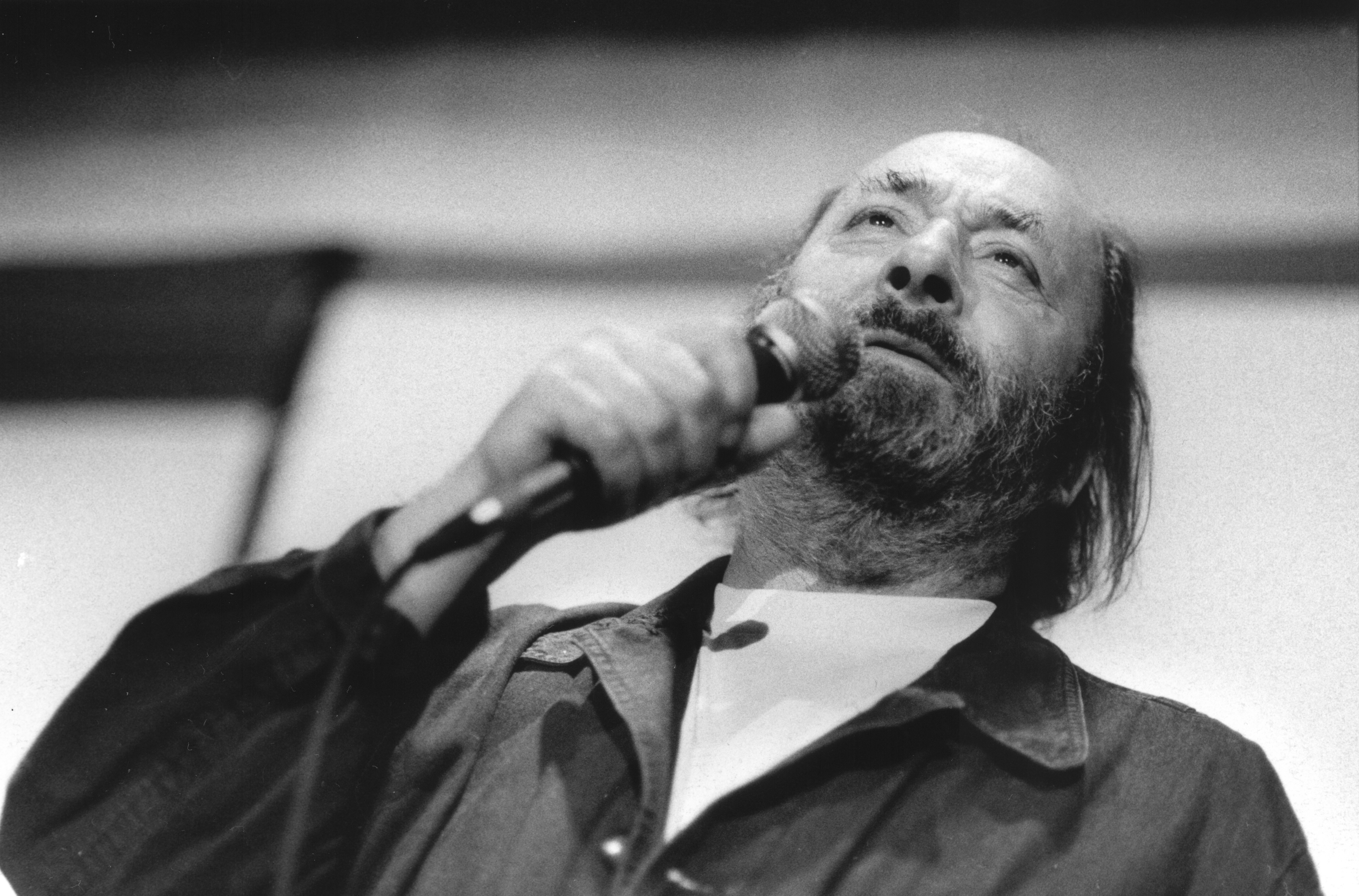
- Ogeret in 1993

Background information
- Born: 25 February 1932; Paris, France
- Died: 4 June 2018 (aged 86) Semur-en-Auxois, France
- Genres: Chanson
- Occupations: Singer, songwriter
- Instrument: Vocals
- Years active: 1954–1990
- Labels: Disques Vogue; EPM Musique

Marc Ogeret (French: [maʁk oʒɘʁe]; 25 February 1932 – 4 June 2018) was a French singer.

== Biography ==
Ogeret was born in Paris in 1932. His mother was a dressmaker and his father worked in the health service of the ministry of war. At 17, he dropped school and worked as an apprentice in a foundry. He later worked in a Renault car factory. Some comedians among his friends convinced him to join them as an actor, and to accompany them with his guitar.

Ogeret started singing around 1954 songs from songwriters such as Félix Leclerc and Léo Ferré outside coffeehouses. Film director Pierre Prévert, the brother of poet Jacques Prévert, gave him the opportunity to sing in Parisian cabarets.

Ogeret recorded his show dedicated to poems by Louis Aragon. In 1965, he was offered the opening act for Georges Brassens on Bobino's stage. In 1968, he recorded two sets of revolutionary songs, but the issue was postponed due to the May 1968 events in France. He became famous for his sober renderings of anarchist and communist anthems such as The Internationale.

He also recorded sea shanties and Le Condamné à mort, a set of poems written by Jean Genet about gay sex in prison. He did a tour in USSR in 1974.

In the late-1970s, he recorded four studio albums of Aristide Bruant's songs. He lived with lifelong partner Anita, and they had a daughter, Zoé.

He was made Knight (Chevalier) of the Ordre des Arts et des Lettres in 1996. Ogeret died on 4 June 2018 at the age of 86.

== Discography ==
- 1962 : Les Mains d'Elsa (Productions Pacific)
- 1967 : Marc Ogeret chante Aragon
- 1968 : Autour de la Commune (Vogue)
- 1968 : Chansons "contre" (Vogue)
- 1970 : Chansons de la marine en bois (Vogue, SLVLX45)
- 1970 : Chansons salées de la marine (Vogue, SLD735)
- 1970 : Le condamné à mort, poem by Jean Genet, music by Hélène Martin (Cavalier LM940)
- 1972 : Rencontres (Vogue, SLD839)
- 1973 : Chansons de révolte et d'espoir (Vogue)
- 1976 : Imagine (Vogue, LDA2023)
- 1978 : La mer (Vogue, LDSE55)
- 1978 : Ogeret chante Bruant (Vogue, LDA2032) - Nouveau prix Académie Charles Cros.
- 1978 : Ogeret chante Bruant. Chansons et monologues Volume 1 & Volume 2 (CD Sony)
- 1979 : En toi (Vogue, VG407)
- 1980 : Chansons "contre" (continuation) (Vogue, VG408574)
- 1981 : Vivre (Vogue, 101634)
- 1984 : Le Condamné à mort (Jean Genet, Hélène Martin), new recording, Vogue, VG 409 540068)
- 1986 : Berger de paroles (Granit)
- 1987 : Nous ferons se lever le jour, poems and songs by Paul Vaillant-Couturier, Réveil des combattants RC 001
- 1988 : Chante la Révolution, Double album 30 cm, Socadisc Sc 370 (CD Socadisc, 1997)
- 1990 : Témoignage sur la période 1940-1945 & Chante la résistance
- 1990 : Ogeret chante Jean Vasca (Le Petit Véhicule)
- 1992 : Chante Aragon (Second Intermède) (EPM)
- 1996 : Chants de marins (EPM)
- 1999 : Ogeret chante Léo Ferré (EPM)

== Awards ==
- 1962: Grand Prix du Disque
- 1978: Grand Prix du Disque
- 1983: Knight of the Ordre des Arts et des Lettres
