= L'Indigné =

Box set by Léo Ferré
- Released: June 10, 2013
- Recorded: 1960–1974
- Genre: Chanson
- Label: Barclay/Universal

L'Indigné (The Rebel) is a 20-CD box set compilation of the recorded studio albums of Léo Ferré for Barclay Records between 1960 and 1974. The limited edition box set was released to mark the 20th anniversary of Ferré's death. The box set brings for the first time together 18 albums remastered from the original records. Live albums and lyrics are not included.

The box set includes 4 never before released songs, 12 unreleased alternatives versions, 17 tracks never released on CD, and a 27 minutes self-portrait of Ferré, taken from Europe 1 station archives. Also included is an illustrated booklet with various pictures, testimonies and interviews of his arranger Jean-Michel Defaye, his photograph Patrick Ullmann, and some more or less heir singers like Bernard Lavilliers, Hubert-Félix Thiéfaine and Cali.

== Track listing ==
CD 1 Paname (tracks 1–8, 1960) / Les Chansons d'Aragon (tracks 9–18, 1961)

1. Paname
2. Merde à Vauban
3. Les Poètes
4. La Maffia
5. Jolie môme
6. Comme à Ostende
7. Quand c'est fini ça recommence
8. Si tu t'en vas
9. L'Affiche rouge
10. Tu n'en reviendras pas
11. Est-ce ainsi que les hommes vivent ?
12. Il n'aurait fallu
13. Les Fourreurs
14. Blues
15. Elsa
16. L'Étrangère
17. Je chante pour passer le temps
18. Je t'aime tant
19. BONUS: Paname (single version)

CD 2 Les Chansons interdites... et autres (1961)

1. Miss guéguerre
2. Les Rupins
3. Thank you Satan
4. Les Quat'cent coups
5. Pacific blues
6. Regardez-les
7. Mon général
8. La Gueuse
9. Les Femmes
10. Ta parole
11. Les Parisiens
12. L'amour
13. Vingt ans
14. Nous deux
15. Les Temps difficiles (1st studio version)
16. Les Chéris
17. Le Vent
18. Chanson mécanisée

CD 3 La Langue française (1962)

1. La Langue française
2. Les Bonnes manières
3. La Vieille pèlerine
4. Ça t'va
5. E.P. Love
6. Mister Giorgina
7. T'es chouette
8. Ça s'lève à l'Est
9. Plus jamais
10. La Vie est louche
11. Les Tziganes
12. T'es rock, coco !

CD 4 Ferré 64 (1964)

1. C'est le printemps
2. La Gauloise
3. Le Marché du poète
4. Mon piano
5. Les Retraités
6. Franco la muerte
7. Titi de Paris
8. La Mélancolie
9. Épique époque
10. Tu sors souvent la mer
11. Sans façon
12. Quand j'étais môme

CD 5 Verlaine et Rimbaud (1964)

1. Écoutez la chanson bien douce
2. Chanson de la plus haute tour
3. Il patinait merveilleusement
4. Mon rêve familier
5. Soleils couchants
6. Les Assis
7. L'espoir luit comme un brin de paille dans l'étable
8. Art poétique
9. Pensionnaires
10. Âme, te souvient-il ?
11. Le Buffet
12. Les Poètes de sept ans
13. Chanson d'automne
14. Les Corbeaux
15. Green
16. Mes petites amoureuses
17. Je vous vois encor
18. L'étoile a pleuré rose
19. Ô triste, triste était mon âme
20. Clair de lune
21. Rêvé pour l'hiver
22. Les Chercheuses de poux
23. Ma Bohème
24. Sérénade

CD 6 Léo Ferré 1916-19... (1965–66)

1. La Chanson des amants
2. Ni Dieu ni maître
3. L'Enfance
4. Monsieur Barclay
5. La Poésie
6. Le Palladium
7. La Faim
8. La Complainte de la télé
9. La Mort
10. Beau saxo
11. On s'aimera
12. Les Romantiques
13. C'est la vie
14. La Grève
15. Paris spleen
16. L'Âge d'or
17. BONUS: Nous deux (alternate version)
18. BONUS: Les Temps difficiles (2nd studio version)
19. BONUS: Les Tziganes (alternate version)
20. BONUS: Plus jamais (alternate version)

CD 7 Cette chanson (1967)

1. Cette chanson
2. La Marseillaise
3. Ils ont voté
4. Quartier Latin
5. À une chanteuse morte
6. La Banlieue
7. On n'est pas des Saints
8. Salut, beatnik !
9. Le Bonheur
10. C'est un air
11. Les Gares, les Ports
12. Le Lit
13. BONUS : Cette chanson (single version)

CD 8 Léo Ferré chante Baudelaire (1967)

1. Spleen
2. À une Malabaraise
3. L'Étranger
4. Tu mettrais l'univers
5. Le Chat (never released on CD before)
6. Le Soleil
7. Le Vin de l'assassin
8. L'Albatros
9. À une passante
10. Le Flacon
11. La Servante au grand cœur
12. Abel et Caïn
13. La Géante
14. Remords posthume
15. Les Bijoux
16. La Musique
17. La Beauté
18. Causerie
19. Recueillement
20. La Muse vénale
21. Ciel brouillé
22. Une charogne
23. Le Vert paradis (Moesta et Errabunda)

CD 9 L'Été 68 (1969)

1. La Nuit
2. Madame la misère
3. Pépée
4. L'Été 68
5. L'Idole
6. Le Testament
7. C'est extra
8. Les Anarchistes
9. A toi
10. Comme une fille

CD 10 Les Douze Premières Chansons de Léo Ferré (1969)

1. À Saint-Germain-des-Prés
2. Flamenco de Paris
3. Monsieur Tout-Blanc
4. L'Inconnue de Londres
5. Les Forains
6. La Vie d'artiste
7. La Chanson du scaphandrier
8. L'Esprit de famille
9. Barbarie
10. Le Temps des roses rouges
11. Le Bateau espagnol
12. L'Île Saint-Louis

CD 11 Amour Anarchie (1970)

1. Le Chien
2. Petite
3. Poète, vos papiers !
4. La Lettre
5. La "The nana"
6. La Mémoire et la Mer
7. Rotterdam
8. Paris, je ne t'aime plus
9. Le Crachat

CD 12 Amour Anarchie (1970)

1. Psaume 151
2. L'Amour fou
3. La Folie
4. Écoute-moi
5. Cette blessure
6. Le Mal
7. Paris c'est une idée
8. Les Passantes
9. Sur la scène
10. Avec le temps
11. L'Adieu

CD 13 La Solitude (1971)

1. La Solitude
2. Les Albatros
3. Ton style
4. Faites l'amour
5. A mon enterrement
6. Les Pop
7. Tu ne dis jamais rien
8. Dans les "Night"
9. Le Conditionnel de variétés
10. BONUS: La Vie d'artiste (alternate version)
11. BONUS: La Solitude (orchestral version)
12. BONUS: La Solitude (alternate mix)

CD 14 La Chanson du mal-aimé (1972)

1. La Chanson du mal-aimé

CD 15 La Solitudine (1972)

1. I pop
2. Piccina
3. Peppe
4. La solitudine
5. Niente piu
6. Gli anarchici
7. Il tuo stile
8. Tu non dici mai niente
9. Col tempo
10. BONUS: Verra la morte (text: Cesare Pavese)
11. BONUS: L'uomo solo (text: Cesare Pavese)
12. BONUS: I poeti (unreleased)
13. BONUS: La notte (unreleased)
14. BONUS: La solitudine (orchestral version never released on CD)
15. BONUS: T'amavo tanto sai... (never released on CD)
16. BONUS: Alla scuola della poesia (never released on CD)
17. BONUS: É la fine (unreleased alternate translation of Niente piu)
18. BONUS: La solitudine (unreleased alternate version)

CD 16 Il n'y a plus rien (1973)

1. Préface
2. Ne chantez pas la mort
3. Night and day
4. Richard
5. L'Oppression
6. Il n'y a plus rien

CD 17 Et... basta ! (1973)

1. Et... basta !
2. Ni Dieu ni maître

CD 18 L'Espoir (1974)

1. L'Espoir
2. La Damnation
3. Les Oiseaux du malheur
4. Je t'aimais bien, tu sais...
5. Les Amants tristes
6. Les Étrangers
7. Les Souvenirs
8. Marie
9. BONUS: L'Espoir (unreleased instrumental rehearsal version)

CD 19 "Live cuts and rarities"

At L'Alhambra, 1961:

1. Cannes-la-braguette (never recorded in the studio)
2. Les Temps difficiles (1st version)
3. Est-ce ainsi que les hommes vivent ? (alternate version)
4. Nous les filles (never recorded in the studio)

At Théâtre de l'ABC, 1962:

1. T'as payé (never recorded in the studio)
2. Les Temps difficiles (2nd version)
3. Stances (never recorded in the studio - Text : Pierre de Ronsard)
4. Les Temps difficiles (3rd version, 1966)

At Bobino, January 1969 (EP never released on CD):

1. Les Anarchistes
2. La Révolution (never recorded in the studio)
3. L'Été 68
4. Comme une fille
5. Ils ont voté

At Bobino, February 1969 (extracts from double LP Récital 1969 en public à Bobino):

1. La Banlieue (alternate version)
2. Marizibil (never recorded in the studio)
3. La Révolution (never recorded in the studio - alternate version)
4. Le Printemps des poètes (never recorded in the studio)

EP Un chien à la Mutualité, 1969:

1. Le Chien
2. Paris je ne t'aime plus
3. Le Crachat

At L'Olympia, 1972:

1. La Fleur de l'âge (never recorded in the studio)
2. Mister the wind (never recorded in the studio)

CD 20 BONUS: Previously unreleased songs and rarities

1. La poésie fout l'camp, Villon !
2. L'Âge d'or (alternate instrumental version)
3. Y'en a marre
4. Chanson pour elle
5. La "The nana" (alternate instrumental version)
6. La "The nana" (alternate version)
7. Thème de l'Albatros (unreleased on CD)
8. Valse de la jeune fille au bal (unreleased on CD)
9. L'Albatros (thème symphonique) (unreleased on CD)
10. La Solitude (alternate version)
11. Ton style (alternate version)
12. Ni Dieu, ni maître, ni fric
13. Le Bateau espagnol (alternate version)
14. Radio self-portraits by Léo Ferré on Europe 1 (January 1961)
