= La Vie moderne: intégrale 1944–1959 =

Box set by Léo Ferré
- Released: December 14, 2018
- Recorded: 1944–1959
- Genre: Chanson
- Label: La Mémoire et la Mer/Universal

La Vie moderne: intégrale 1944–1959 (Modern life: complete collection 1944–1959) is a 14-CD box set compilation of Léo Ferré studio and live albums recorded for Le Chant du Monde and Odeon Records between 1950 and 1958. The box set brings together for the first time nine historical albums, several 78s and 45s cuts, rarities and unreleased radio archives, with many alternative versions. Lyrics are not included. This is the first box set of a complete collection of works recorded by the artist.

== Track listing ==
CD 1: Le Temps des roses rouges (Le Chant du Monde, 1950)
Brings 78s cuts together.

1. La Chanson du scaphandrier
2. Monsieur William
3. Monsieur Tout-Blanc
4. La Vie d'artiste
5. Le Bateau Espagnol
6. La Femme adultère
7. À Saint-Germain-des-Prés
8. L'Île Saint-Louis
9. Le Flamenco de Paris
10. L'Inconnue de Londres
11. Les Forains
12. Barbarie
13. L'a toute de la Moretta
14. Le Temps des roses rouges
15. L'Île Saint-Louis (alternative version)
16. Le Flamenco de Paris (alternative version)

CD 2: Chansons de Léo Ferré (Le Chant du Monde, 1954)
New recording of the previously released 78s songs.

1. L'Île Saint-Louis
2. La Chanson du scaphandrier
3. Barbarie
4. L'Inconnue de Londres
5. Le Bateau Espagnol
6. À Saint-Germain-des-Prés
7. La Vie d'artiste
8. Le Flamenco de Paris
9. Les Forains
10. Monsieur Tout-Blanc
11. L'Esprit de famille

CD 3: Paris canaille (Odeon, 1953)

1. Monsieur William
2. La Chambre
3. Vitrines
4. Le Pont Mirabeau
5. Judas
6. Notre amour
7. ... Et des clous
8. Les Cloches de Notre-Dame
9. Paris canaille
10. Martha la mule
11. Les Grandes Vacances

CD 4: Le Piano du pauvre (Odeon, 1954)

1. Le Piano du pauvre
2. À la Seine
3. L'Homme
4. Le Parvenu
5. Mon p'tit voyou
6. Notre-Dame de la mouise
7. Graine d'ananar
8. Merci mon Dieu
9. Mon p'tit voyou (instrumental)
10. Merci mon Dieu (instrumental)

CD 5: La Rue (Odeon, 1955)
This disc sets 78s and 45s cuts together posthumously.

1. La Rue
2. Vise la réclame
3. Ma vieille branche
4. Monsieur mon passé
5. L'âme du rouquin
6. La Vie
7. La Chanson triste
8. En amour
9. Le Fleuve aux amants

CD 6: Récital à l'Olympia (Odeon, 1955)
Live show recorded at Olympia music hall (Paris) between the 10th and the 13th of March 1955. Orchestra conducting: Gaston Lapeyronnie.

1. La Vie
2. Monsieur mon passé
3. Graine d'ananar
4. Le Piano du pauvre
5. Vise la réclame
6. L'Homme
7. Merci mon Dieu
8. Mon p'tit voyou
9. Monsieur William
10. L'Âme du rouquin
11. Paris canaille
12. La Rue

CD 7: Le Guinche (Odeon, 1955)

1. Le Guinche
2. La Fortune
3. Ma vieille branche
4. T'en as
5. La Grande Vie
6. Le Temps du plastique
7. Pauvre Rutebeuf
8. L'Amour
9. L’été s’en fout
10. Les Copains d'la neuille

CD 8: Les Fleurs du mal (Odeon, 1957)
Léo Ferré sings Charles Baudelaire.

1. Harmonie du soir
2. Le serpent qui danse
3. Les Hiboux
4. Le Léthé
5. Le Revenant
6. La Mort des amants
7. L'Invitation au voyage
8. Les Métamorphoses du vampire
9. A celle qui est trop gaie
10. La Vie antérieure
11. La Pipe
12. Brumes et pluies
13. L'Invitation au voyage (radio version)

CD 9: La Chanson du mal-aimé (Odeon, 1957)
Léo Ferré sings Guillaume Apollinaire.

1. La Chanson du mal-aimé
2. La Symphonie interrompue (concert live from 1954)

CD 10: Léo Ferré à Bobino (Odeon, 1958)
Live show recorded at Bobino music hall between the 3rd and the 15th of January 1958.
Musicians: Jean Cardon (accordion), Barthélémy Rosso (guitar), Paul Castanier (piano), Léo Ferré (piano).

1. La Fortune
2. Comme dans la haute
3. Java partout
4. Monsieur mon passé
5. Le Guinche
6. Le Flamenco de Paris
7. Pauvre Rutebeuf
8. Les Indifférentes
9. La Zizique
10. Mon Sébasto
11. L'Homme
12. T'en as
13. Graine d'ananar
14. Paris canaille

CD 11: Encore... du Léo Ferré (Odeon, 1958)

1. Le Temps du tango
2. La Chanson triste
3. La Vie moderne
4. Mon camarade
5. L’été s’en fout
6. Le Jazz band
7. L’Étang chimérique
8. Dieu est nègre
9. Les Copains d’la neuille
10. Tahiti
11. Java partout
12. La Zizique
13. Mon Sébasto

CD 12: Documents 1 - 1944-1952
French Radio broadcasting and artist's personal archives.

1. Le Carnaval de tous les jours (1944)
2. L'Opéra du ciel (1945)
3. Suzon (1945)
4. Le Viveur lunaire (1946)
5. Ils broyaient du noir (1946)
6. Moi, j' vois tout en bleu (1946)
7. Moi, j' vois tout en bleu (instrumental, 1946)
8. Paris (1948)
9. Les Grandes Vacances (1948)
10. La Rengaine d'amour (1948)
11. Les Châteaux (1949)
12. La Clef (1949)
13. Le Fleuve aux amants (1949)
14. J'ai tant rêvé (1950)
15. La Chambre (1950)
16. À La Villette (1950)
17. Les Cloches de Notre-Dame (live, 1950)
18. Madame Angleterre (live, 1950)
19. Viole de voiles (1950)
20. L'Île Saint-Louis (1950)
21. Les Hommes de la nuit (movie soundtrack, 1952)

CD 13: Documents 2 - De sacs et de cordes
Radio drama for narrator, singers and orchestra. Narrator: Jean Gabin

1. Ouverture
2. Frères humains
3. L'Esprit de famille
4. « Ah ! La rue... »
5. Air du cireur
6. La Bonne Aventure
7. « Brusquement cette charmante enfant... »
8. Les Forains
9. La Tamise
10. Madame Angleterre
11. « Je suis parti sur un de ces bateaux... »
12. Ohé oh hisse
13. Madre De Dios
14. « Dans les flancs du Madre de Dios... »
15. Le Flamenco de Paris
16. Le Bateau espagnol
17. C'est la fille du pirate
18. « Les deniers me crevaient les poches... »
19. En amour (ouverture)
20. En amour
21. La Femme adultère
22. Dans les draps que l'amour
23. Barbarie
24. Les Douze
25. « Ils me redonnèrent quelque goût... »
26. Les Oiseaux libres
27. « Pour soulever le toit... »
28. Kol Nidrei
29. Petit soldat
30. « Au paradis des pauvres chiens... »
31. « Je décidais de me fixer... »
32. L'Inconnue de Londres
33. « Si j'avais eu le sens du repentir... »
34. Le Parvenu
35. Frères humains (reprise)

CD 14: Documents 3 - 1953-1959
French Radio broadcasting archives.

1. Byzance (1953)
2. Le Piano du pauvre (1954)
3. Le Pont Mirabeau (1955)
4. Pauvre Rutebeuf (1956)
5. L'Opéra du ciel (1957)
6. Dieu est nègre (1955 ou 57 ?)
7. La Zizique (1957)
8. Les Amoureux du Havre (1958)
9. Comme dans la haute (1958)
10. La Mafia (1958)
11. Rappelle-toi (1957)
12. Tu n'en reviendras pas (1959)
13. Je chante pour passer le temps (1959)
14. L'Étrangère (1959)
15. La Belle Amour (1959)
16. Soleil (1959)
17. Des filles, il en pleut... (1959)
18. Green (1959)
19. L'Âge d'or (1959)
20. Sérénade (1959)
21. La Mauvaise Graine (1959)
22. Noël (1959)

== Credits ==
- Production: Mathieu Ferré & Alain Raemackers
- Visual artists: Hervé Morvan (boxset picture), Joseph Cayet, Harcourt, D.R., Hubert Grooteclaes (booklet photos), Vital Maladrech (graphic design), Max Brunel, Serge Jacques, Georges Justh, André Bonnet, Joseph Cayet, Gabriel Terbots, Hervé Morvan, André Villers (original albums covers)
- Liner notes: Mathieu Ferré, Alain Raemackers
