= Une saison en enfer (album) =

1991 studio album by Léo Ferré

Studio album by Léo Ferré
- Released: November 1991
- Recorded: October 1991; Regson Studio, Milan
- Genre: Chanson, Song
- Length: 67:10
- Label: EPM Musique, La Mémoire et la Mer
- Producer: Léo Ferré

Léo Ferré chronology
Les Vieux Copains (1990)	Une saison en enfer (1991)	Métamec (2000)

Une saison en enfer (English: A Season in Hell) is Léo Ferré's last studio album. It sets into music the whole eponymous poem written in 1873 by French poet Arthur Rimbaud. The album was released in 1991 by EPM Musique (982 181), for the 100th anniversary of Rimbaud's death, both as double LP and CD. It was reissued in 2000 by Ferré's son's label La Mémoire et la Mer, under a new cover.

Unlike his previous musical works on poets such as Apollinaire (1954), Baudelaire (1957, 1967, 1977, 1987), Louis Aragon (1961), or Verlaine and Rimbaud (1964), Ferré chose here bareness in the arrangements (piano, whistling, claps of hands, and nothing more but the voice declaiming, whispering or chanting) to provide the illusion of a half-improvised music and keep the poem's "original spouting strength", and most of all express his own conception of oral poetry by letting himself being only guided by musicality of rimbadian prose itself.

Being connected with Rimbaud's poetic themes, Ferré gives an interpretation which "lightens" the meanings of the text.

== Track listing ==
Text : Arthur Rimbaud. Music, piano, whistling, clapping & singing : Léo Ferré.

No.	Title	Length
1.	"Jadis, si je me souviens bien [...]" (Once, if my memory serves me well...)	2:23
2.	"Mauvais sang" (Bad Blood)	15:43
3.	"Nuit de l'enfer" (Night in hell)	6:51
4.	"Délires I : Vierge folle - L'Époux infernal" (Delirium 1: The Foolish Virgin - The Infernal Spouse)	12:47
5.	"Délires II : Alchimie du verbe" (Delirium 2: Alchemy of Words)	14:03
6.	"L'Impossible" (The Impossible)	5:41
7.	"L'Éclair" (Lightning)	3:07
8.	"Matin" (Morning)	2:10
9.	"Adieu" (Farewell)	4:28
