= Il n'y a plus rien =

Studio album by Léo Ferré
- Released: 1973
- Recorded: December 1972; Barclay Studio, Paris (France)
- Genres: Chanson, symphonic
- Length: 45:15
- Label: Barclay Records

Léo Ferré chronology
| Seul en scène (1973) | Il n'y a plus rien (1973) | Et... basta ! (1973) |

Il n'y a plus rien (English: There Is No More) is an album by Léo Ferré, released in 1973 by Barclay Records. The general mood of the music here is dark, both exasperated and desperate, and the lyrics "paint pictures of sordid Parisian clubs, of the injustice of society, of death and of life, of lost friendships and of failing domestic relationships".

== History ==
After having inserted two symphonic songs ("Ton style", "Tu ne dis jamais rien") in his pop rock oriented album La Solitude (1971), after having re-recorded his 1950s oratorio on Guillaume Apollinaire's vast poem La Chanson du mal-aimé ("Song of the Poorly Loved", 1972), Ferré was ready to establish himself as an artist, author and musician, who did without any arrangers' services from then. So he went completely symphonic with his own material for the first time (he had gone orchestral before with arranger Jean-Michel Defaye but it was mostly on renowned material by French poets from the 19th century - see Verlaine et Rimbaud and Léo Ferré chante Baudelaire albums) and he often replaces singing by intense spoken-word and declamation.

The album opens with the straightforward manifesto "Preface", a reduction of a much longer text that precisely prefaces Poète... vos papiers! (Poet... your documents!), a collection of his poems formerly published in January 1957. As Ferré says, "the most beautiful songs are songs that demand justice". The discipline of poetry is meant to teach us how to fight so we can free our mind:

"Modern poetry doesn’t sing any more – it crawls on its arse. And yet it pretends to be refined. It has no time for dirty words: it doesn’t even know they exist. Words are handled with kid gloves: ‘menstrual blood’ is called ‘an indisposition’ and people go round insisting that certain terms should be confined to the laboratory or the dictionary. (...) Poetry isn’t made with words – words are brought alive by poetry. (...) Poetry is an outcry, it must be heard like music. All poetry that is only meant to be read is imprisoned by the printed page and remains incomplete. It is given sex by the human voice, just like a violin touched by a bow."

The album ends with the radical, pessimistic yet epic and fighting "Il n'y a plus rien" ("There is no more"), that deals with libertarian and revolutionary utopias disappointment from the 1960s and May 68. This anarchist outburst is an example of one of the first uses of whale vocalization in popular music.

== Track listing ==
All songs written, composed, arranged and directed by Léo Ferré, except Ne chantez pas la mort whose text is written by Jean-Roger Caussimon.

Original LP

Side one
| No. | Title | Length |
|---|---|---|
| 1. | "Préface" (Preface) | 3:20 |
| 2. | "Ne chantez pas la mort" (Don't Sing about Death) | 7:31 |
| 3. | "Night and day" | 6:40 |
| 4. | "Richard" | 5:09 |

Side two
| No. | Title | Length |
|---|---|---|
| 5. | "L'Oppression" (Oppression) | 6:29 |
| 6. | "Il n'y a plus rien" (There Is Nothing Anymore) | 16:08 |
| Total length: | | 45:15 |

== Credits ==
- Danielle Licari: voice
- The orchestra consists of session musicians hired for the recording
- Arranger & orchestra conductor: Léo Ferré
- Director of engineering: Claude Achallé
- Engineers: Charles Rochko, Philippe Omnes
- Executive producer: Richard Marsan
- Artwork: Patrick Ullmann, Geneviève Vanhaecke
