= Les Fleurs du mal (disambiguation) =

Les Fleurs du mal is an 1857 poetry collection by Charles Baudelaire.

Les Fleurs du mal may also refer to:

== Film and television ==
- La fleur du mal , a 2003 French film by Claude Chabrol
- "Fleurs du Mal" (The Batman), an episode of the television series The Batman

== Music ==
- Les Fleurs du mal (Léo Ferré album), 1957
- Les Fleurs du Mal (Sopor Aeternus & the Ensemble of Shadows album), 2007
- Les Fleurs du mal (suite et fin), a 2008 album by Léo Ferré
- Les Fleurs du Mal (Therion album), 2012
- Les Fleurs Du Mal, a 2007 album by Blood
- "Fleurs du Mal", a song by Sarah Brightman from the 2008 album Symphony

== Other uses ==
- Fleur du Mal, an American women's clothing, lingerie, and swimwear brand
- La Fleur du Mal (comics), a fictional sword of the Marvel Comics character Guillotine

== See also ==
- Flower of Evil (disambiguation)
