= Seul en scène (Olympia 1972) =

Live album by Léo Ferré
- Released: 1973
- Recorded: 1972, November 11 & 12
- Venue: Olympia, Paris
- Genre: Chanson
- Length: 115:56
- Label: Barclay Records
- Producer: Richard Marsan

Léo Ferré chronology
Il n'y a plus rien (1973)	Seul en scène (1973)	Et... Basta ! (1973)

Seul en scène – Olympia 1972 (Alone on stage) is a double album by poet and singer-songwriter Léo Ferré, recorded live during his time at the Olympia in Paris, in November 1972. Published by Barclay Records in 1973, the record does not initially render the recital in its entirety.

To celebrate the centenary of the birth of the artist, Universal released for the first time in September 2016 a complete version, which includes ten songs missing.

== Track listing ==
All tracks written and composed by Léo Ferré except where noted.

Original vinyl side one
No.	Title	Length
1.	"Les Oiseaux du malheur" ("Birds of Misfortune")
2.	"La Fleur de l'âge" (Prime of Life)
3.	"La Mélancolie" ("Melancholy")
4.	"Le Crachat" ("The Spit")
5.	"Les Souvenirs" ("Memories")

Original vinyl side two
No.	Title	Length
6.	"Vingt Ans" ("Twenty Years")
7.	"Les Amants tristes" ("Sad Lovers")
8.	"Avec Le Temps" ("As Time Goes By")

Original vinyl side three
No.	Title	Length
9.	"Préface"
10.	"Ton Style" ("Your Style")
11.	"Nigh and day"
12.	"Les Étrangers" ("Strangers")
13.	"Mister the wind"
14.	"Comme à Ostende"

Original vinyl side four
No.	Title	Length
15.	"Ne chantez pas la mort"
16.	"Richard"
17.	"Il n'y a plus rien"

The track list here is based on the 2016 complete edition. Songs marked (*) were absent in the original vinyl edition and 2001 and 2003 CD editions.

=== Disc one ===
No.	Title	Length
1.	"Le Chien" (*)	4:31
2.	"Les Copains d' la neuille" (*)	2:39
3.	"Les Oiseaux du malheur"	2:01
4.	"Rotterdam" (*)	2:44
5.	"La Fleur de l'âge"	3:54
6.	"La Mélancolie"	4:02
7.	"Le Crachat"	2:56
8.	"Les Souvenirs"	3:32
9.	"Vitrines" (*)	4:12
10.	"L'Oppression"	3:23
11.	"Vingt ans"	2:59
12.	"Les Amants tristes"	8:35
13.	"Avec le temps"	4:36

=== Disc two ===
No.	Title	Writer(s)	Length
1.	"Préface" (*)		2:56
2.	"Les Poètes"		2:33
3.	"Ton style"		3:39
4.	"La Damnation" (*)		2:38
5.	"Pépée" (*)		2:53
6.	"Les Étrangers"		4:01
7.	"Mister the wind"		2:56
8.	"La Mémoire et la Mer" (*)		4:27
9.	"Night and day"		4:33
10.	"Comme à Ostende"	Jean-Roger Caussimon	3:33
11.	"Ne chantez pas la mort"	Jean-Roger Caussimon	6:18
12.	"Richard"		3:13
13.	"La Solitude" (*)		3:37
14.	"Ni Dieu ni maître" (*)		3:13
15.	"Il n'y a plus rien"		15:23

== Personnel ==
- Léo Ferré – vocals
- Paul Castanier – piano

== Production ==
- Engineering: Claude Achallé
- Executive producer: Richard Marsan
- Artwork: Patrick Ullmann
