= Jean-Luc Chaignaud =

French opera singer

Jean-Luc Chaignaud (born 3 August 1959) is a French soloist baritone, singer of operas, lieder and oratorio.

== Biography ==
Born in Pantin, Chaignaud studied singing with Régine Crespin and Gabriel Bacquier at the Conservatoire de Paris, then entered the École d'Art Lyrique of the Paris Opera where he participated in the master classes of Christa Ludwig and Hans Hotter. After making his debut in 1988 at the musical May in Bordeaux and at the Ossiachersee Festival in Austria, he was hired by Herbert von Karajan for the role of Silvano in Un ballo in maschera by Verdi, along Plácido Domingo, Josephine Barstow and Sumi Jo, recorded for Deutsche Grammophon (1989). A staging by John Schlesinger of this production, this time under the baton of Sir Georg Solti, is directed for the Salzburg Festival in 1989 and 1990 and also filmed (Arthaus/TDK, 1990).

His training with the German mezzo-soprano Christa Ludwig is decisive for her career, as she recounts in her memoirs "My voice and me" during a dithyrambic passage on the talent of this baritone of a "very beautiful voice" and who "sings well with musicality". During a first and only audition for the role of Figaro at the Vienna State Opera, director Eberhard Wächter immediately gave Chaignaud a multi-year contract, propelling him into a career on major international stages.

During the 1991-1992 season at the Vienna State Opera, he embodied the character of Belcore in Donizetti's L'elisir d'amore alongside the Italian tenor Luciano Pavarotti and Marcello in Puccini's La bohème with the Italian soprano Mirella Freni. His work with these two great performers, "mythical couple of opera", with whom he shared the stage several times in Vienna and Paris, had a great influence on his approach to singing and on the evolution of his career. In 1993, the French critics praised him for his work with the Italian soprano Mirella Freni. His work with these two great performers,"mythical couple of opera", with whom he shared the stage several times in Vienna and Paris, had a great influence on his approach to singing and on the evolution of his career. In 1993, the French critics praised him for his work. The first French national daily newspaper Le Figaro described Jean-Luc Chaignaud as a "stage prodigy", "dazzling with humanity and tenderness" and praised his voice "marvellously conducted, iridescent with beautiful colours".

Chaignaud's explanatory and musical qualities go hand in hand with his voice and "his solid profession". Mainly known for the roles of Lescaut in the operas Manon by Massenet alongside Renée Fleming, Marcello in La Bohème by Puccini alongside Roberto Alagna, and Escamillo in Carmen by Bizet directed by Franco Zeffirelli, he sings in a repertoire that includes operas by Mozart, Verdi, Donizetti, Puccini and Bizet, in major theatres such as the Metropolitan Opera of New York, the Paris Opera, the Vienna State Opera, La Scala of Milan, the Grand theatre of Liceu of Barcelona, Carnegie Hall in New York, the Royal Albert Hall London, the Bavarian State Opera of Munich and the Peking opera.

Over the course of more than thirty years of his international career, Chaignaud has performed a wide variety of repertoires and styles throughout the world: The Italian repertoire of Bel canto but also the Baroque, lieder, oratorio and contemporary Music such as Ça Ira by Roger Waters. His recordings include an exceptional recital at the Louvre of the Lieder eines fahrenden Gesellen by Mahler with the Quatuor Arditti under the direction of Michel Béroff on the occasion of the reopening of the museum in 1989, Adriana Lecouvreur by Cilea with Mirella Freni (La sept Arte/Opéra national de Paris, France Musique, 1994), Massenet's Manon with Renée Fleming (Arthaus, 2009), Donizetti's L'elisir d'amore with Rolando Villazón (Virgin Classics, 2010) and a tribute to the Franco-Monegasque poet-songwriter-performer Léo Ferré at the Opéra de Monte-Carlo (OPMC Classics, 2014).

He has collaborated with conductors such as Herbert von Karajan, Sir Georg Solti, Riccardo Muti, Giuseppe Sinopoli, Richard Bonynge, Seiji Ozawa, Pierre Boulez, Valery Gergiev, Jeffrey Tate, Christian Thielemann, Daniel Oren, Charles Dutoit and Christoph Eschenbach.

== Roles (selection) ==
- Marcello / La Bohème (Puccini)
- Sharpless / Madame Butterfly (Puccini)
- Belcore / L'elisir d'amore (Donizetti)
- Riccardo Forth / Lucia di Lamermoor (Donizetti)
- Comte Almaviva / Le nozze di Figaro (Mozart)
- Guglielmo / Cosi fan Tutte (Mozart)
- Rôle Titre / Don Giovanni (Mozart)
- Pasquariello / Don Giovanni (Gazzaniga)
- Escamillo / Carmen (Bizet)
- Zurga / Les pêcheurs de perles (Bizet)
- De Siriex / Fedora (Giordano)
- Lescaut / Manon (Massenet)
- Albert / Werther (Massenet)
- Lescaut / Manon Lescaut (Puccini)
- Figaro / The Barber of Seville (Rossini)
- Bartholo / The Barber of Seville (Rossini)
- Raimbault / Le Comte Ory (Rossini)
- Silvano / Un ballo in maschera de (Verdi)
- Ford / Falstaff (Verdi)
- Germont / La traviata (Verdi)
- Marquis de Posa / Don Carlos (Verdi)
- Michonnet / Adriana Lecouvreur (Francesco Cilea)
- Schlemil / Les Contes d'Hoffmann (Offenbach)
- Riccardo / i Puritani (Bellini)
- Rôle Titre / Eugene Onegin ( Tchaikovsky)
- Jeletsky / The Queen of Spades ( Tchaikovsky)
- L'Empereur / The Nightingale ( Tchaikovsky)
- Arlequin / Ariadne auf Naxos (R. Strauss)
- Mandryka / Arabella (Strauss)
- Silvio / Pagliacci (Ruggero Leoncavallo)
- Golaud / Pelléas et Melisande (Debussy)
- Nevers / les Huguenots (Meyerbeer)
- Karnac / Le roi d’Ys (Lalo)
- Usher / La chute de la maison Usher (Debussy)
- Les Chorèbe / Les Troyens (Berlioz)
- Mephistophélès / La Damnation de Faust (Berlioz)
- Valentin / Faust (Gounod)
- Rôle-titre / Garibaldi en Sicile (Panni)
- Rôle-titre / Elias (Mendelssohn)
- Rôle-Titre / Hamlet (Ambroise Thomas)

== Discography (selection) ==
- Un ballo in maschera (Verdi), Wiener Philharmoniker / dir. Herbert Von Karajan with Plácido Domingo, Josephine Barstow, Sumi Jo (CD and DVD)
- Le Tombeau de Van Gogh (Damase, Duhamel), les Philharmonistes de Chateauroux / dir. Janos Komives
- Les Contes d'Hoffmann (Offenbach), Staatskapelle Dresden / dir. Jeffrey Tate
- Le Comte Ory (Rossini), European orchestra of the Festival d'Aix-en-Provence / dir. Evelino Pidò with Sumi Jo, diff. France 2
- Lieder eines fahrenden Gesellen (Mahler), Quatuor Arditti / dir. Michel Béroff, récital exceptionnel au Musée du Louvre
- Don Giovanni (Gazzaniga), Radio France orchestra / dir. Philippe Herreweghe
- Don Giovanni (Gazzaniga), Orchestre Münchner Rundfunkorchester / dir. Stefan Soltesz
- Carmen (Bizet), Bayerisches Staatorchester / dir. Giuseppe Sinopoli with Jennifer Larmore
- La Bohème (Puccini), Orchestre de l'Opéra de Paris / dir. James Conlon with Roberto Alagna, diff. France 2
- Mélodies de Poulenc (Poulenc), Orchestre de la Suisse Romande / dir. Fabio Luisi
- Manon (Massenet), L’Opéra National de Paris / Dir. Jésus Lopes-Cobos (CD et DVD)
- Ça Ira (Roger Waters), three-act opera
- Salomé (Mariotte), l’Orchestre de Montpellier / dir. Friedemann Layer
- Adriana Lecouvreur (Francesco Cilea), La sept Arte/Opéra national de Paris, France Musique / dir. Maurizio Benini with Mirella Freni, film shown at the Louvre
- L'elisir d'amore (Donizetti), Symphonic Orchestra of the Grand theatre of the Liceu / dir. Daniele Callegari with Rolando Villazón (CD et DVD)
- La Chanson du mal-aimé (Léo Ferré), Monte-Carlo Philharmonic Orchestra / Dir. Gianluigi Gelmetti
