= A Season in Hell (disambiguation) =

A Season in Hell (Une Saison en Enfer) is a poetic work by Arthur Rimbaud.

A Season in Hell may also refer to:

- A Season in Hell (1971 film), a drama film starring Terence Stamp
- A Season in Hell (Wednesday Theatre), a 1964 Australian TV play
- Une saison en enfer (album) (translated as A Season in Hell), a 1991 album by singer-songwriter Léo Ferré, who set the whole eponymous poetic work of Rimbaud into music
- A Season in Hell (album), 2006, by Chicago pop-punk band October Fall
- A Season in Hell, a 1989 novel by Jack Higgins
- A Season in Hell, an album from film Eddie and the Cruisers
- "A Season In Hell", a song by Moby from the 1996 album Animal Rights
- "A Season in Hell" (Doctors), a 2004 television episode
