= Isabel Muñoz =

Spanish photographer (born 1951)

Isabel Muñoz (born 1951) is a Spanish photographer who lives in Madrid.

== Life and work ==
Muñoz was born in Barcelona and grew up in the Catalonia region with a Valencian family and some ancestors of remote origin.

When she was 20 years old, she moved to Madrid and started studying photography in 1979 at Photocentro.

Her black and white photos are a study of people through pieces of the human body or pictures of toreros, dancers or Warriors. She uses a handmade and meticulous process called platinotype, a technique that early 19th century photographers used, which has great quality and a unique texture. Muñoz primarily uses black and white in her works, except when exploring anthropological or social issues. In such occasions, like working with drag queens and primitive tribes, she will use color.

She travels the world carrying out works of architecture and addressing the issues of child trafficking and slavery in Southeast Asia. In Ethiopia (2005) she focused on the Tribes who decorate their bodies as a way of expression: the Surma, Nyangaton, Hammer, Banna, Bodi, Mursi, Karo and Nuer. In 2006, she visited El Salvador to take photos of urban tribes and produce works about violence. She worked on a project, Nuesto Pequeno Mundo, to photograph children on the commemoration of the 20th anniversary of the Convention of the Rights of the Child. She traveled to Iran, Syria, Turkey and Iraq and exhibited the work El amor y el éxtasis as part of PHotoEspaña 2010. In Mexico, she exhibited La Bestia, which goes across Mexico packed with immigrants, with great risk for their lives. In 2015, she decides to look for the links of where we come from, by investigating the great apes.

== Publications ==
- Parade Nuptiale. 1992 Fata Morgana. With an essay by Gérard Macé.
- María Ilusión. Plume, 1995.
- Rome Efemer. Gallimard, 1997.
- Figures Sans Visages. Fata Morgana, 1997. With an essay by Macé.
- Rome, l'invention du Barroque. Marva, 1997. With an essay by Macé.
- Isabel Muñoz. La Fábrica, 2000. With an essay by Christian Caujolle
- Obras Maestras. La Fábrica, 2010. With an essay by Caujolle

== Prizes ==
- Medalla de Oro en la Bienal de Alejandría, 1999
- 2nd Prize in "The Arts Stories" World Press Photo 43rd Edition for "Chinese Martial Arts Training"
- 3rd Prize "Portraits Stories" World Press Photo 48th Edition for "The Surma people of Ethiopia"
- World Press Photo International award, 1999
- World Press Photo International award, 2004
- Community Photography Prize Madrid, 2006
- PHotoEspaña Prize, 2009
- Medal of Merit of the Fine Arts, 2009
- National Photography Prize, 2016

== Solo exhibitions ==
- Isabel Muñoz, Mougins Center of Photography, Mougins, France, 2021
