= Avec le temps (Léo Ferré song) =

Single by Léo Ferré
- B-side: "L'Adieu"
- Released: 1970
- Recorded: 21 October 1970
- Length: 4:28
- Label: Barclay
- Songwriter(s): Léo Ferré
- Producer(s): Richard Marsan

Léo Ferré singles chronology
"La The Nana" (1970)	"Avec le temps" (1970)	"La Solitude" (1971)

"Avec le temps" ("With time") is a 1970 song written, composed and sung by the French artist Léo Ferré. It was recorded in October 1970 for volume 2 of his Amour Anarchie album, but the record label dismissed the song, seen as not suiting the general mood of others songs.

It was first released as a 45, then on a compilation LP in 1972 called Avec le temps : Les chansons d'amour de Léo Ferré.

This tragic and beautifully sad love song, inspired by Ferré's own disenchantment and recent breakup, was an instant classic. It is one of his most famous songs (along with Paris canaille, Jolie Môme, C'est extra), becoming with time the most constantly covered French song worldwide.

It was chosen by Arsene Wenger when he appeared on Desert Island Disks on 22 November 2020

== Single cover ==
The cover photography is by the photographer Patrick Ullmann.

== Personnel ==
- Danielle Licari: vocals (uncredited) on "L'Adieu".
- The orchestra consists of session musicians hired for the recording.

== Production ==
- Arranger & conductor: Jean-Michel Defaye
- Engineering: Gerhard Lehner
- Executive producer: Richard Marsan

== Covers and adaptations ==
Avec le temps was performed, among others, by: Céline Dion, Bernard Lavilliers, Hiba Tawaji, Catherine Sauvage, Dalida, Philippe Léotard, Renée Claude, Henri Salvador, Catherine Ribeiro, Juliette Gréco, Alain Bashung, Michel Jonasz, Belinda Carlisle, Abbey Lincoln, Mônica Passos, Bertrand Cantat, Youn Sun Nah, the duet Brad Mehldau and Anne Sofie von Otter, Johnny Hallyday, Benjamin Biolay, Tony Hymas, Daniel Lavoie...
