= Je te donne =

Je te donne is French for "I give you".

It is also the name of:

- "Je te donne" (song), a 1985 song Jean-Jacques Goldman and Michael Jones, covered by Worlds Apart (in 1996) and by Leslie and Ivyrise (in 2012)
- Je te donne (album), a 1976 album by Léo Ferré
