= La Violence et l'Ennui =

Studio album by Léo Ferré
- Released: 1980
- Recorded: February 1979 at Regson Studio, Milan (Italy) ? 1979 at Fonior Studio, Brussels (Belgium)
- Genres: Chanson, symphonic
- Length: 39:41
- Labels: RCA, La Mémoire et la Mer

Léo Ferré chronology
Il est six heures ici et midi à New York (1979)	La Violence et l'Ennui (1980)	L'Imaginaire (1982)

La Violence et l'Ennui (English: Violence and Boredom) is an album by Léo Ferré released in 1980 by RCA Records.

== History ==
Léo Ferré reveals during interviews with French medias the mindset behind this album: for him, in 1980 "the time is pathetic, dismal, flabby, sweating with fear... People let them being scammed far too much. All you want to make them swallow, they swallow; you lead them by the nose. They are not stupid however; but you hammer so many slogans and advertisements in their heads that they end up being impregnated."

Ferré puts here his three previous albums' (relative) serenity aside and reintroduces poetic violence, sharp spoken word and urgency feel in his work, to counteract artistically and morally what he considers to be a lack of critical thinking from his contemporaries, self-denial and submission he sees all around him.

About boredom, he says in 1981, "Never let boredom win over you. If you feel it coming then you must go out, yell, screw up power and millenniums of morality you carry on your shoulders, go far away... get out of that glue."

This album is the result of two separate recording sessions: one with the RAI National Symphony Orchestra, taken from the recording sessions of the previous album (Il est six heures ici et midi à New York) in February 1979, and the other carried almost alone by Ferré in Brussels, far from his usual collaborators in Italy (where he lives since 1970).

== Track listing ==
All songs written, composed, arranged and directed by Léo Ferré, except Frères humains, l'amour n'a pas d'âge, written by François Villon and Léo Ferré.

Original LP

Side one
No.	Title	Length
1.	"La Violence et l'Ennui" (Violence and Boredom)	6:22
2.	"La Tristesse" (Sadness)	5:00
3.	"Géométriquement tien" (Geometrically Yours)	3:01
4.	"Words... Words... Words..."	5:09

Side two
No.	Title	Length
5.	"Marseille"	3:55
6.	"La Mer Noire" (The Black Sea)	5:07
7.	"FLB"	6:57
8.	"Frères humains, l'amour n'a pas d'âge" (Human brothers, Love as no Age)	4:27
Total length:		39:41

== Personnel ==
- Léo Ferré – piano, organ
- Afonso Vieira – percussion
- Guy Lukowski – guitar
- Milan Symphonic Orchestra

== Production ==
- Producer: Léo Ferré
- Engineer: Paolo Bocchi (tracks 2, 4, 8), Jan Vercauteren (tracks 1, 3, 5, 6, 7)
- Arranger: Léo Ferré
- Cover photography: André Villers
