= Je parle à n'importe qui =

Studio album by Léo Ferré
- Released: April 20, 2018
- Recorded: First semester of 1977, Castellina in Chianti (Italy)
- Genre: Chanson; Poetry
- Length: 57:25
- Label: La Mémoire et la Mer

Léo Ferré chronology
Les Fleurs du mal (suite et fin) (2008)	Je parle à n'importe qui (2018)

Je parle à n'importe qui (English: I talk to anyone) is an album by Léo Ferré posthumously released in 2018 by La Mémoire et la Mer. This is Ferré's eighth posthumous album and the first to be published in ten years.

The album is a demo tape of one long poem recorded by hand and at home by Ferré during 1977. Ferré accompanies himself on the piano. The original tape has been indexed into 15 tracks.

== Track listing ==
Texts & music by Léo Ferré.

No.	Title	Length
1.	"Dans le désastre de la fourmilière" (Into anthill disaster)	6:00
2.	"Dans une maison douce" (In a sweet home)	2:50
3.	"Je te volupte" (I delight you)	2:57
4.	"En ces temps-là" (In those Days)	2:06
5.	"L'Espoir" (Hope)	3:46
6.	"J'habite à Ostende" (I live in Ostende)	4:38
7.	"File-moi une taffe" (Give me a Puff)	2:07
8.	"Les Oiseaux rapaces" (Birds of Prey)	3:14
9.	"Boulevard des Italiens"	1:50
10.	"Cette fille" (This Girl)	3:39
11.	"Sur la mer" (On the Sea)	2:43
12.	"Chanter L'Enfer" (To sing Inferno)	3:26
13.	"Mon amour inchangé" (My unchanged love)	3:33
14.	"Demain ? Nothing !" (Tomorrow? Nothing!)	9:32
15.	"Écoute !" (Listen!)	5:02

== Credits ==
- Léo Ferré - Piano & vocals
- Tape restoration and mastering: Anaëlle Marsollier, at Studio La Buissonne
- Cover photography: Patrick Ullmann (1st edition), André Villers (2nd edition)
- Package Art & Design: Vital Maladrech (first edition)
- Liner notes: Alain Raemackers
- Coordinated by Alain Raemackers & Mathieu Ferré
