= L'Opéra du pauvre =

Studio album by Léo Ferré
- Released: 1983
- Recorded: April 10 to 20, July 10, 1983; Regson Studio, Milan
- Genres: Chanson, Song, Classical, Spoken word, Jazz, Theatre
- Length: 2:17:42
- Labels: RCA (1983); EPM Musique (1991); La Mémoire et la Mer (2022)
- Producer: Léo Ferré

Léo Ferré chronology
L'Imaginaire (1982)	L'Opéra du pauvre (1983)	Léo Ferré au Théâtre des Champs-Élysées (1984)

L'Opéra du pauvre (English: Poor's Opera) is a piece for voices and orchestra formalized by Léo Ferré as a quadruple concept album released in 1983. This dreamlike and wry plea in favor of the Night, symbol of imagination and subversiveness for Ferré, synthesizes all aspects of the French poet and musician.

== History ==
L'Opéra du pauvre comes from a "lyrical" ballet titled The Night, written in 1956 at the request of choreographer and dancer Roland Petit, within the Revue des Ballets de Paris. The piece was abandoned by Petit after a few performances (critics being severely negative). Ferré published the libretto the same year at La Table Ronde Editions. This work stayed on the shelf for twenty-six years.

It was after the triple LP Ludwig - L'Imaginaire - Le Bateau ivre was released in 1982, that Léo Ferré decided to dedicate his upcoming year to bring The Night back to life. As time had passed, Ferré had accumulated a lot of material, and he chose to enrich his original text and score with elements from various sources, thus creating a new Baroque work of much larger scope (it would take four LP to hold this whole new version).

== Roles ==
Léo Ferré changes his voice and acts all parts.

- Narrator
- The Night, defendant
- The Raven, presiding judge
- The Cock, prosecutor
- The Owl, Night's attorney
- The Cat, court clerk
- The Nun, witness
- The Rose, witness
- Calva, night-club landlord and witness
- Miseria, witness
- The Glow-worm, witness
- The two Prostitutes, witnesses
- The Child, witness
- The Casino Player, witness
- The Candle, witness
- Death, witness
- The Blue Whale, witness
- The Poet, witness
- Hearing audience
- Saint Peter's voice & various voices

== Synopsis ==
The Night is accused of having murdered Lady Shadow, who is missing. The opera depicts Night's trial by the "day people", allegorized by animals. The judge is a raven, the prosecutor is a cock, Night's attorney is an owl and the court clerk is a cat. Witnesses, all night owls for some reason of their own, are called to the bar and try to save the Night.

== Personnel ==
- Léo Ferré - voices, piano
- Giuseppe Magnani - violin solo
- Milan Symphonic Orchestra

== Production ==
- Arranger and orchestra conductor: Léo Ferré
- Engineer: Paolo Bocchi
- Producer: Léo Ferré
