= Flower of Evil =

(The) Flower of Evil(s) may refer to:

== Books and comics ==
- Les Fleurs du mal (English: The Flowers of Evil), an 1857 poetry collection by Charles Baudelaire
- The Flower of Evil (manhwa), a manhwa series by Lee Hyeon-Sook
- The Flowers of Evil (manga), a manga series by Shuzo Oshimi

== Film and television ==
- Flower of Evil (film), a 1915 Italian film
- A Flower of Evil, a 1961 South Korean film
- Flowers of Evil (Police Woman), an episode of the TV series Police Woman
- The Flower of Evil (film), a 2003 French film
- Flower of Evil (South Korean TV series), a South Korean TV series
  - Flower of Evil (Philippine TV series), a Philippine TV series based on the South Korean TV series

== Music ==
=== Albums ===
- Flowers of Evil, a 1969 album by Ruth White
- Flowers of Evil (Mountain album), a 1971 album by Mountain
- Flower of Evil (album), a 2008 album by Susanna
- Flowers of Evil (Ulver album), a 2020 album by Ulver

=== Songs ===
- "Las flores del mal" (English: "The Flowers of Evil"), a song by Baron Rojo from their 1982 album Volumen brutal (English: Brutal Volume)
- "Flowers of Evil", a song by Ric Ocasek from his 1991 album Fireball Zone
- "Flowers of Evil", a song by Deathline International from their 1993 album Reality Check
- "The Flowers of Evil", a song by Marilyn Manson from their 2012 album Born Villain

== See also ==
- Les Fleurs du mal (disambiguation)
