= Danielle Licari =

French singer

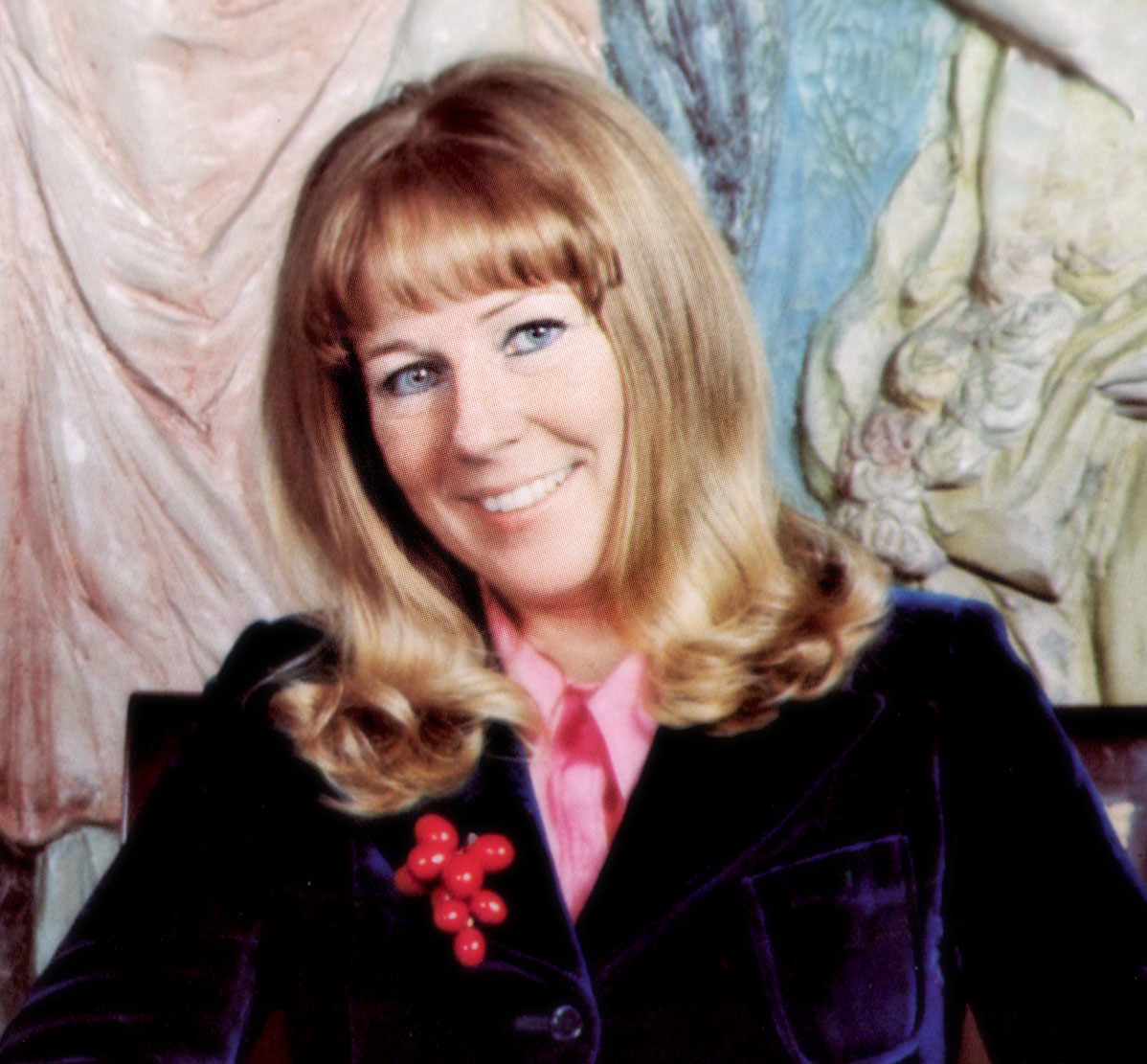
- Danielle Licari

Background information
- Born: Danielle Cuvillier; 30 November 1936 (age 88); Boulogne-sur-Mer, France
- Occupation: Singer
- Years active: 1960s and 1970s
- Website: daniellelicari.com

Danielle Licari (born Danielle Cuvillier on 30 November 1936, in Boulogne-sur-Mer) is a French singer who was active in the 1960s and 1970s. She is now remembered primarily as the vocalist of the song "Concerto pour une Voix".

== Career ==
In 1964, she dubbed the singing in the movie The Umbrellas of Cherbourg for the role of Geneviève Émery, played by Catherine Deneuve.

From 1965 to 1967 she sang in the vocal trio Les Fizz with Jackie Castan and Nadine Doukhan, two other ex-Djinns Singers. Backed by Jacques Denjean's orchestra, the band released three EPs.

In 1968, she recorded "Treize jours en France", composed by Francis Lai; she also recorded a second version of "Love Story" dedicated to her by the same composer.

In 1969, she recorded her greatest hit, "Concerto pour une Voix". The album has sold over 15 million copies.

In 1972, she submitted her song "Au cœur d'une chanson" to compete in the Eurovision contest representing France. The French committee selected Betty Mars and her song "Come-Comedie" instead.

In 1972, she represented France in the "World Popular Song Festival" held in Tokyo, Japan. Her song "Une Vie" was a finalist.

In 1973, she participated as a vocalist to an album considered as a masterpiece of French chanson: the symphonic, dark and epic Il n'y a plus rien (There is nothing anymore) by singer-songwriter Léo Ferré.

In July 1978, she sang with the Quebec Symphony Orchestra and the choir of St-Dominique Church. The piece chosen was a musical drama called Concerto pour Helene, in honour of Helene Boule, the wife of the founder of Quebec City, as part of the city's 370th anniversary celebrations. The work was composed by Claude Léveillée.

In 1982, she voiced Princess Aurora in the French dub of Sleeping Beauty.

Wyclef Jean sampled "Concerto Pour Une Voix" in his 1997 song "Apocalypse."

She has sold over 20 million copies of her albums during her career. Her songs are found in easy listening CD compilations worldwide.

== Singing style ==
Her characteristic singing style lacked lyrics, communicating emotions through sounds, the way a violin would. This may have fueled her popularity in non-French speaking countries like Germany, Spain, Mexico, Brazil, Japan and Korea. She used her voice like a musical instrument giving a soft, unique dream-like tone. She has been called la voz de la sirena ("the voice of a Siren"). Most of her recordings are arrangements of classical themes composed originally for instruments rather than voice, while the arrangements consist generally of large orchestral ensembles mixed with a pop-rock band instrumentation. She incorporated pop-rock elements that made her music appealing. Her singing style influenced Japanese Anime soundtracks of the 1980s such as Seiji Yokoyama (Saint Seiya).

== Discography ==
=== Studio albums ===
Year	Title	Label	Release country
1965	La Geographie en Chansons	Barclay	France & Canada
1965	Lecon de Choses en Chansons	Barclay	France & Canada
1966	Vivre la Nuit	Phillips	France and Japan
1967	Jesus: La Vie de Jesus en 12 Chansons with the Francois Rauber Orchestra	Phillips	France
1969	Sanctus: Musique Sacree Pour Piano, Orgue et Voix	Phillips	France, Canada, Mexico
1969	Concerto Pour Une Voix	Barclay	Worldwide release
1970	On Est Bien La-La	Barclay	France
1973	Screen Themes Golden Prize	Barclay	France, Canada and Japan
1974	Danielle Licari Live in Japan (with Obi)	Barclay	Japan
1974–75	Danielle Licari	Barclay	France, Canada, Japan, Mexico
1975	Le Marche Persan	Barclay	France, Canada, Japan, Mexico
1976	Rhapsodie Pour Deux Voix	Barclay	France, Canada, Japan, Mexico
1977	Saggitarius	Barclay	France, Canada, Mexico
1978	Rappel	Barclay	France, Canada, Mexico
1979	Concerto Pour Elle	Heloise	France and Canada
1980	Elisabeth Serenade	Amo Records	France, Japan
1980	Danielle Licari Chante Ennio Morricone: Mal de Toi	Le Petit Menestral	France
1981	Heidi	Ades	France
1982	Concerto Pour Deux Voix	Victor	Brazil, France, Canada
1984	Lonely Shepherd	Disques Star	France and Canada
1984	Romance	Star	France and Canada
1993	Sanctus: Musique Sacree Pour Piano, Orgue et Voix (re-release)	PolyGram Projects	France and Canada
1995	Danielle Licari chante les plus grands	Disques Quality	Canada
	Pinocchio, Joli Pantin	Ades	

=== Backing vocals ===
Danièle Licari also sang for other artists, such as French singer-songwriter Léo Ferré.

Year	Title	Artist	Label	Release country
1970	Amour Anarchie	Léo Ferré	Barclay	France, Canada
1971	L'Albatros (excerpts from Jean-Pierre Mocky's movie soundtrack)	Léo Ferré	Barclay	France
1973	Il n'y a plus rien	Léo Ferré	Barclay	France, Canada

=== Singles ===
Year	Title	Label	Release country
1969	"Concerto pour une voix"	Barclay	Worldwide
1970	"Adagio Romantique"	Barclay	France, Japan, Mexico
1971	"Prelude Pour Un Amour: Melodie Pour un Autoumne"	Barclay	France
1972	"Une Vie"	Barclay	France, Japan
1975	"Histoire D'O (Geschichte der O)"	Barclay	Canada, France and Germany
1975	La Canzone di Orlando	Barclay	Italy, Canada, France
	"Concerto Pour Une Voix"	Multiple labels	Japan, Canada, Mexico, Brazil, Israel
	"Les Parapluies de Cherbourg"	Multiple labels	France, Canada, Japan
	"Rhapsodie Pour Deux Voix"	Barclay	France
1977	"Adagio de Albinoni / Concerto No 1 En Si Bemol De Tchaikowski"	Barclay	France and Canada
1979	"Concerto pour Elle" (Re-release)	Barclay	France
1981	"Les Chansons de Pierrot"		France
1981	"Prelude Pour Un Amour: Melodie Pour un Autoumne" (Re-release)	Barclay	Canada
1983	"Le Chant des étoiles"	Barclay	France

=== Collections ===
- The Greatest Hits (Universal). Distributed in Latin America, Spain, France, Canada, the United States, Japan, Korea and many more
- The Best Collection of World Popular Music: Pops and Vocals, Volume 5. (PolyGram Records)
- 1981: Double compilation – Concerto pour une voix (Pro-Culture, Canada only)
- 1993: Master Série (PolyGram)
- 1994: Best of Best (RCA Victor, Japan only)
- 1999: Concerto pour une Voix – compilation CD (RCA Victor, Japan only)

=== Soundtracks ===
- 1964 – The Umbrellas of Cherbourg (While parts of the melody are used throughout the movie, the full song "Devant le Garage" is sung by the character Geneviève Emery, played by Catherine Deneuve and dubbed by Danielle Licari)
- 1971 – The Deadly Trap (singing voice)
- 1981 – J'en ai rêvé ("Once Upon a Dream") in Disney's second French version of Sleeping Beauty (first was released by Huguette Boulangeot)
- 1985 – Asterix et la surprise de Cesar
