= Ashok Dilwali =

Indian photographer

Ashok Dilwali (born 1944) – also known as Shiri Ashok Dilwali – is a photographer. In 2019 he received the Lifetime Achievement Award in the 7th National Photography Awards. He received a cash prize of Rs. 3,00,000.

Dilwali is best known for his work on the Himalayas. He has published 25 nature- and landscape- related books. He is a member of the India International Centre, the India Habitat Centre, the Indian Mountaineering Foundation and the Royal Photographic Society. He is also a Fellow of Royal Geographical Society.
