= Je te donne (album) =

Studio album by Léo Ferré
- Released: Fall of 1976
- Recorded: June 1976
- Venue: Milan, Italy
- Genre: Chanson, symphonic
- Length: 51:32
- Label: CBS Disques (1976); La Mémoire et la Mer (2000)

Léo Ferré chronology
Ferré muet... (1975)	Je te donne (1976)	Les Fleurs du mal (suite et fin) (1977)

Je te donne (English: I give to you) is an album by Léo Ferré released in 1976 by CBS Records.

== Track listing ==
All songs written, composed, arranged and directed by Léo Ferré, except Coriolan, composed by Ludwig van Beethoven.

Original LP

Side one
No.	Title	Length
1.	"Je te donne" (I give to you)	3:37
2.	"La Mort des loups" (Death of the Wolves)	9:34
3.	"Love"	10:23

Side two
No.	Title	Length
4.	"Muss es sein ? Es muss sein !"	3:30
5.	"Coriolan (ouverture)"	9:37
6.	"Le Superlatif" (Superlative)	7:32
7.	"Requiem"	7:04

== Personnel ==
- Milan Symphonic Orchestra

== Production ==
- Arranger & conductor: Léo Ferré
- Engineering: Davide Marinone
- Executive producer: Detto Mariano
