= André Villers =

French photographer (1930–2016)

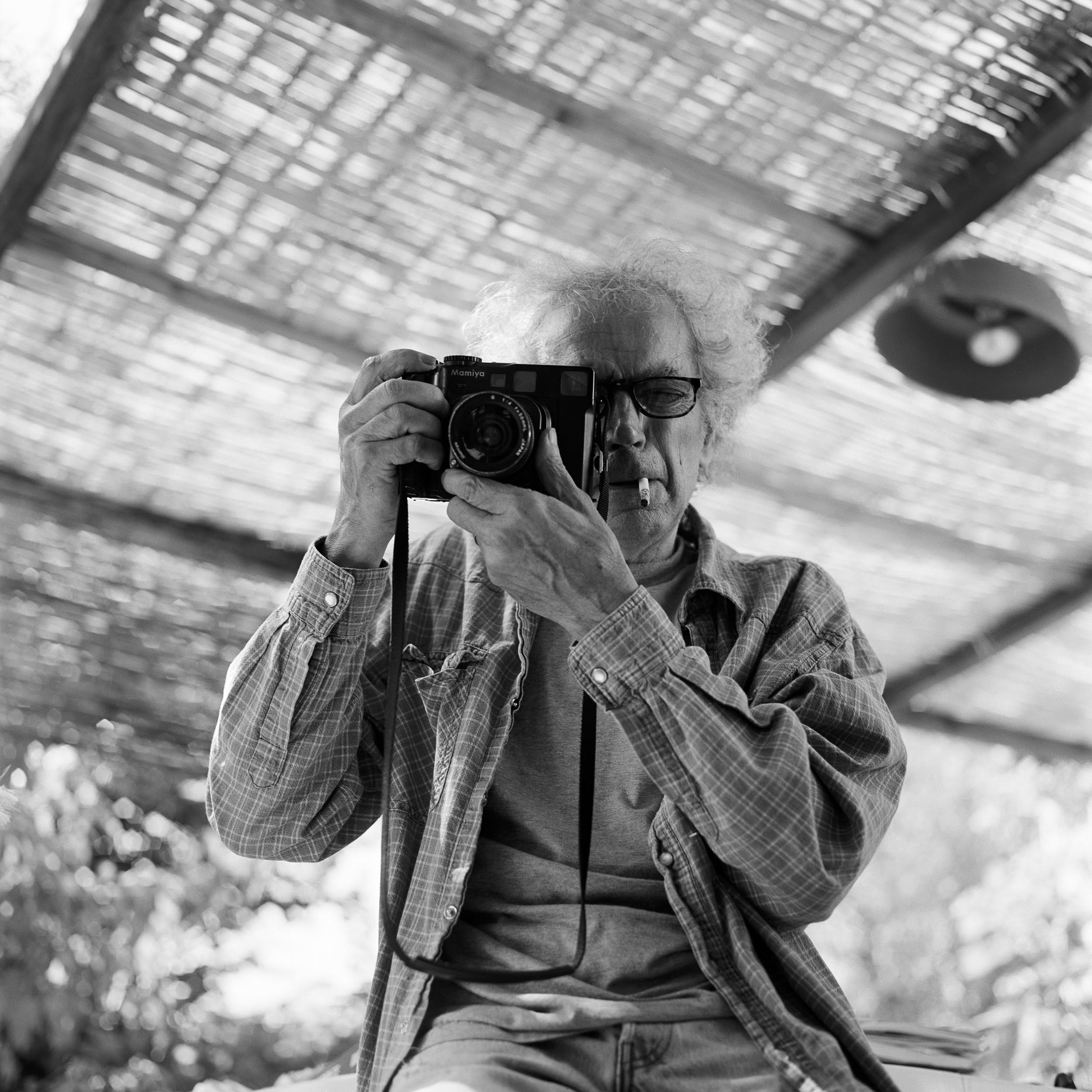
- André Villers photographed by Oliver Mark, Mougins 2000
- Born: 10 October 1930; Beaucourt, France
- Died: 1 April 2016 (aged 85); Le Luc, France
- Occupations: Photographer, painter, paper artist

André Villers (French: [ɑ̃dʁe vilɛʁ]; 10 October 1930 – 1 April 2016) was a French photographer, painter and paper artist, "best known for his pictures of Pablo Picasso in the south of France in the 1950s."

== Life and work ==
Villers was born in Beaucourt. In 1947, following a bone tuberculosis, he was hospitalized at a sanatorium in Vallauris where he stayed for eight years. During that period, he was introduced to photography and started making in 1952 his first experiments in the darkroom, and pictures of Vallauris and its inhabitants.

He met Picasso there in March 1953, who offered him his first camera, a Rolleiflex. Villers produced many portraits of the painter, and their relationship evolved into working together, making hundreds of images based on photographic experiments. In 1962, Heinz Berggruen edited a book, Diurnes (Daytime), based on thirty of these images accompanied by an original text by Jacques Prévert.

Since the 1950s, Villers shot many portraits of great artists, among them: Fernand Léger, Alexander Calder, Jacques Prévert, Alberto Magnelli, Oliver Mark, Jean Arp, Le Corbusier, Salvador Dalí, Joan Miró, Marc Chagall, Max Ernst, Jean Cocteau, Bram van Velde, César Baldaccini, Hans Hartung, Pierre Soulages, Antoni Clavé, Antoni Tàpies, Francis Ponge, Luis Buñuel, Federico Fellini, Léo Ferré, Michel Butor, Ben Vautier, Henri Dutilleux, and Zao Wou Ki.

In 1970, he began to experiment with a new way of creating his photography without a camera. He made the negatives himself from pieces of tracing paper. This series was exhibited and a book was released with a text by Michel Butor, Pliages d'Ombres (Folding Shadows).

Since then, his personal photographic work was based upon experimentation with shadows and transparencies. He tried to use several emulsion techniques (solarisations, jets of developer).

In the mid-1950s, Villers began a set of carvings titled Ex-Photos that were exhibited in 1970 at the Loeb Gallery in Paris. In the 1980s, he did a set of paintings on cardboard, The Photographers, exhibited in Paris, Tokyo and New York by the Yoshii Gallery. His friend David Douglas Duncan devoted a book to it entitled A Secret Garden.

In the 1980s, Karel Appel made a set of paintings on photographs of Villers. Later, Robert Combas also worked with him.

In 1984, he published his text Photobiographie recounting his life, his artistic process and his relationship with Picasso in a special issue of Les Cahiers du Sud dedicated to him.

In November 1999, AndréVillers met italian painter Daniel Schinasi, founder of the Umanesimo Neofuturista, while he was preparing a major retrospective, organised by the Château-Musée in Cagnes in 2000, in collaboraton with art historian and critics, Jaques Lepage and André Verdet.

During their meeting at Villers' house and studio in Mougins, he decided to photographed Schinasi and, impressed by his work, offered him the entire photographic series. One of these photographs was selected for the cover of the exhibition catalogue, Schinasi, published by the City of Cagnes-sur-Mer and the Château-Musée.

Since the 2000s, he produced a set of paper cuts works.

Significant collections of his photographic work can be found at the Nicephorus-Niepce Museum in Chalon-sur-Saône and the Museum of Photography in Charleroi in Belgium.

The city of Mougins in the Alpes Maritimes honored Villers with the creation of a Museum of Photography bearing his name. The museum closed in 2018, and in 2021 the Mougins Center of Photography opened in its place.

On 14 July 2006, Villers became a Chevalier des Arts et des Lettres.

He died on 1 April 2016.

== Bibliography (extracts) ==
- 1959 Portraits de Picasso, text by Jacques Prévert (Milan, Muggiani)
- 1962 Diurnes in collaboration with Pablo Picasso, text by Jacques Prévert
- 1977 Pliages d'Ombres with a text by Michel Butor
- 1984 Cahiers du Sud Special issue dédicated to André Villers
- 1986 Photobiographie Dole Museum, France
- 1987 Picasso à Vallauris (Nice, Z'Editions)
- 1990 Das Fotogramm in der Kunst des 20 Jahrhunderts Floris M. Neussus (Dumont Buchverlag)
- 1992 L'œil Multiple Patrick Roegiers (La Manufacture)
- 1992 A Secret Garden David Douglas Duncan (DDD Edition)
- 1995 Picasso et la photographie Anne Baldassari (Réunion des Musées Nationaux)
- 1997 The Dark Mirror Anne Baldassari (Réunion des Musées Nationaux)
- 2000 André Villers, Rétrospective Patrick Roegiers (Théatre de la Photographie et de L'image, Nice)
- 2001 André Villers, Lumière des Ombres Frédéric Ballester (La Malmaison, Cannes)
- 2004 Picasso e Altri ritratti Ta Matete Gallery (Rome)
- 2005 Le Regard Continu Patrick Roegiers (La Pierre d'Alun)
- 2006 Guiding Light Michael Hoppen Gallery (London)
- 2008 Album Villers Debora Ferrari and Luca Traini (Fabbrica Arte, Italy)
- 2011 Villers et les Sapone, Photographies d'une amitié (Sapone Gallery, Nice)
- 2012 Picasso, les Chemins du Sud Editions Skira Flammarion/Musée National Picasso Paris
- 2012 André Villers, 60 ans de Photographies Editions Centre d'art Malmaison/Cannes
- 2014 Picasso and the Camera John Richardson (Gagosian Gallery, New York)
- 2016 Villers/Picasso (Gagosian Gallery, Geneva)

== Filmography ==
- 1982 Le Photographe s'appelle André Villers Alain Bedos, 52 Mn
- 1987 La Conférence des photographes Jean-Michel Vecchiet, 26 Mn
- 1996 Picasso-Villers, Diurnes Jean-Michel Vecchiet, 26 Mn
- 1998 Les 1001 Visages d'André Villers Jean-Michel Vecchiet, 52 Mn
- 2010 Portrait d'André Villers Robert Matthey, 26mn
- 2016 André Villers, A Lifetime in Images Marketa Tomanova, 62mn
