= Verlaine et Rimbaud =

1964 studio album by Léo Ferré

Studio album by Léo Ferré
- Released: December 1964
- Recorded: May 1964; Barclay Studio, Paris (France)
- Genre: Chanson
- Length: 60:19
- Label: Barclay Records

Léo Ferré chronology
Ferré 64 (1964)	Verlaine et Rimbaud (1964)	Léo Ferré 1916-19... (1966)

Verlaine et Rimbaud (English: "Verlaine and Rimbaud") is an album by Léo Ferré. It was released in December 1964 by Barclay Records. This album is one of the first studio double albums in popular music history (before Bob Dylan's or Frank Zappa's).

== Background ==
Verlaine et Rimbaud is Ferré's third LP entirely dedicated to a poet, after Baudelaire's Les Fleurs du mal ("Flowers of Evil") in 1957 and Les Chansons d'Aragon ("Songs of Aragon") in 1961. Here, Ferré sets into music 10 poems from Arthur Rimbaud and 14 from Paul Verlaine. He considers their two different kind of poetry as a whole and mixes them in the track listing, to underline their mythical love affair. The way classical music 'soundscape' tastefully fits into tuneful and straightforward songs is something of an achievement here.

== Track listing ==
All songs composed by Léo Ferré.

Original LP

Side one
No.	Title	Writer(s)	Length
1.	"Écoutez la chanson bien douce" (Hear the sweetest song pass)	Paul Verlaine	2:44
2.	"Chanson de la plus haute tour" (Song of the highest Tower)	Arthur Rimbaud	2:12
3.	"Il patinait merveilleusement" (He ice-skated beautifully)	Paul Verlaine	1:48
4.	"Mon rêve familier" (My Familiar Dream)	Paul Verlaine	2:01
5.	"Soleils couchants" (Sunsets)	Paul Verlaine	1:47
6.	"Les Assis" (Those who Sit)	Arthur Rimbaud	3:10
7.	"L'espoir luit comme un brin de paille dans l'étable" (Hope shines as in a stable a wisp of straw)	Paul Verlaine	2:12

Side two
No.	Title	Writer(s)	Length
8.	"Art poétique" (Ars Poetica)	Paul Verlaine	3:26
9.	"Pensionnaires" (Boarder Girls)	Paul Verlaine	2:25
10.	"Âme, te souvient-il ?" (Do you remember, my soul?)	Paul Verlaine	2:39
11.	"Le Buffet" (The Cupboard)	Arthur Rimbaud	2:01
12.	"Les Poètes de sept ans" (The Seven-year-old Poets)	Arthur Rimbaud	5:08

Side three
No.	Title	Writer(s)	Length
1.	"Chanson d'automne" (Autumn Song)	Paul Verlaine	2:30
2.	"Les Corbeaux" (The Rooks)	Arthur Rimbaud	2:15
3.	"Green"	Paul Verlaine	2:44
4.	"Mes Petites Amoureuses" (My Little Mistresses)	Arthur Rimbaud	2:24
5.	"Je vous vois encor" (Birds in the Night (extract))	Paul Verlaine	2:03
6.	"L'étoile a pleuré rose" (The Star has wept rose-colour)	Arthur Rimbaud	1:28

Side four
No.	Title	Writer(s)	Length
7.	"Ô triste, triste était mon âme" (So sad my heart, so sad it was...)	Paul Verlaine	2:44
8.	"Rêvé pour l'hiver" (A Dream for Winter)	Arthur Rimbaud	2:00
9.	"Clair de lune" (Moonlight)	Paul Verlaine	2:12
10.	"Les Chercheuses de poux" (The Seekers of Lice)	Arthur Rimbaud	3:00
11.	"Ma Bohème" (My Bohemian Life)	Arthur Rimbaud	1:18
12.	"Sérénade" (Serenade)	Paul Verlaine	2:44

== Personnel ==
- Janine de Waleyne – backing vocals (uncredited)
- Lionel Gali – violin solo (uncredited)
- Barthélémy Rosso – guitar (uncredited)
- The orchestra consists of session musicians hired for the recording

== Credits ==
- Jean-Michel Defaye – arranger & orchestra conductor
- Gerhard Lehner – director of engineering
- Jean Fernandez – executive producer
- Maurice Frot – artwork
- Hubert Grooteclaes – photography
- Léo Ferré - original liner notes
