= L'Été 68 =

Studio album by Léo Ferré
- Released: 1969
- Recorded: December 1968 – January 1969; Barclay Studio, Paris (France)
- Genre: Chanson
- Length: 35:20
- Label: Barclay Records

Léo Ferré chronology
| Léo Ferré chante Baudelaire (1967) | L'Été 68 (1969) | Récital 1969 en public à Bobino (1969) |

Singles from L'Été 68
- 1. "La Nuit" Released: 1969; 2. "Pépée" Released: 1969; 3. "C'est extra" Released: 1969

Professional ratings
Review scores
| Source | Rating |

L'Été 68 (English: Summer of '68) is an album by Léo Ferré, released in 1969 by Barclay Records.

== Track listing ==
All songs written and composed by Léo Ferré.

Original LP

Side one
| No. | Title | Length |
|---|---|---|
| 1. | "La Nuit" (The Night) | 4:19 |
| 2. | "Madame la misère" (Miss Misery) | 2:29 |
| 3. | "Pépée" | 4:32 |
| 4. | "L'Été 68" (Summer of '68) | 2:00 |
| 5. | "L'Idole" (The Star) | 4:14 |

Side two
| No. | Title | Length |
|---|---|---|
| 6. | "Le Testament" | 4:10 |
| 7. | "C'est extra" (It's superb) | 3:49 |
| 8. | "Les Anarchistes" (The Anarchists) | 3:13 |
| 9. | "À toi" (To you) | 4:18 |
| 10. | "Comme une fille" (Like a girl) | 2:19 |

== Personnel ==
- The orchestra consists of session musicians hired for the recording.

== Production ==
- Arranger & conductor: Jean-Michel Defaye
- Engineering: Gerhard Lehner
- Executive producer: Richard Marsan
- Artwork: Hubert Grooteclaes
