= L'Espoir (album) =

Studio album by Léo Ferré
- Released: January 1974
- Recorded: January 1974
- Studio: Barclay Studio, Paris, France
- Genre: Chanson, symphonic
- Length: 40:51
- Label: Barclay
- Producer: Richard Marsan

Léo Ferré chronology
Et... basta ! (1973)	L'Espoir (1974)	Ferré muet... (1975)

Singles from L'Espoir
- 1. "Je t'aimais bien, tu sais" Released: 1973

Professional ratings
Review scores
Source	Rating

L'Espoir (English: Hope) is an album by Léo Ferré released in 1974 by Barclay Records.

== Track listing ==
All songs written, composed, arranged and directed by Léo Ferré, except Marie, whose text is written by Guillaume Apollinaire.

Original LP

Side one
No.	Title	Length
1.	"L'Espoir" (Hope)	6:22
2.	"La Damnation" (Damnation)	5:00
3.	"Les Oiseaux du malheur" (Birds of Misfortune)	3:01
4.	"Je t'aimais bien, tu sais..." (I Liked You, you know...)	5:09

Side two
No.	Title	Length
5.	"Les Amants tristes" (Sad Lovers)	10:25
6.	"Les Étrangers" (Strangers)	6:14
7.	"Les Souvenirs" (Memories)	4:44

Since 2003, CD reissues add song Marie as a bonus track to the original album. This song was originally B-side of 12-inch single Je t'aimais bien, tu sais, released in 1973.

No.	Title	Length
8.	"Marie"	4:25
Total length:		45:15

== Personnel ==
- Janine de Waleyne: vocals (tracks 1, 2, 4, 5, 8)
- Ivry Gitlis: violin (track 6)
- The orchestra consists of session musicians hired for the recording.

== Production ==
- Arranger and conductor: Léo Ferré
- Executive producer: Richard Marsan
