= Amour Anarchie =

Studio album by Léo Ferré
- Released: May 1970 (vol. 1); November 1970 (vol. 2); December 1970 (double album)
- Recorded: January, March, April, October 1970; Barclay Studio, Paris (France)
- Genres: Chanson; French Pop
- Length: 92:08
- Label: Barclay Records

Léo Ferré chronology
Les Douze Premières Chansons de Léo Ferré (1969)	Amour Anarchie (1970)	La Solitude (1971)

Singles from Amour Anarchie
- 1. "La The Nana" Released: 1970; 2. "Avec le temps" Released: 1971

Professional ratings
Review scores
Source	Rating

Amour Anarchie (English: Anarchy Love) is a double album by Léo Ferré, released in 1970 by Barclay Records. With this album, heavily influenced by sexual revolution and considered by critics as one of his finest, containing a whole string of his classics (like Avec le temps, La Mémoire et la Mer, Le Chien, Poète, vos papiers ! ... ), the singer-songwriter begins to blend singing with dynamic spoken word. In 2010, the French edition of Rolling Stone magazine named this album the 24th greatest French rock album (out of 100).

== History ==
After he had sung in Canada in 1969, Léo Ferré, who was interested in rock music, briefly went to New York City to find the right sound for his "new language", used in his insurrectionary poem Le Chien. Initially, a studio session was intended with Jimi Hendrix, who cancelled, being ill. Ferré recorded with John McLaughlin and Billy Cobham, guitarist and drummer of Mahavishnu Orchestra, and Miroslav Vitous, bassist of Weather Report. For some reason, Ferré didn't use this version and re-recorded the track with Zoo, a young French band recently signed to his record label Barclay, going more de-structured (with a more irregular beat). In this song, Ferré uses powerful spoken word to claim his difference and reject societal hypocrisy.

He sets to music several poems from his book Poète... vos papiers! (the self-same track, Les Passantes, Psaume 151, Le Crachat), that critics would praise as a truly renewal of his inspiration, without noticing these texts had been mostly written in the early 50s.

Most of the "new" material is love songs, most of the time straightforwardly eroticized, except for Avec le temps (As time goes by), a tragic and beautifully sad love song inspired by his own disenchantment and the failure of his relationship with his second wife. It was dismissed from the original LP by his record label and was released on 45s one year later (it is included in the album since CD editions). This instant-classic is the most well-known of Ferré's favorites, becoming with years the most constantly covered French song in France and worldwide. It topped a ranking established in 2012 by 276 contemporary French singers and musicians (and 69 critics) of the best French songs ever.

== Track listing ==
All tracks are written by Léo Ferré, except L'Adieu (The Farewell) whose text is written by Guillaume Apollinaire.

Original vinyl side one
No.	Title	Length
1.	"Le Chien" (The Dog)	6:55
2.	"Petite" (Little Girl)	5:02
3.	"Poète, vos papiers!" (Poet, Your Documents!)	5:25
4.	"La Lettre" (The Letter)	3:26

Original vinyl side two
No.	Title	Length
5.	"La "The Nana"" (The Ultimate Doll)	4:27
6.	"La Mémoire et la Mer" (The Memory and The Sea)	5:29
7.	"Rotterdam"	2:54
8.	"Paris, je ne t'aime plus" (Paris, I Don't Love You Anymore)	5:17
9.	"Le Crachat" (The Spit)	3:43

Original vinyl side three
No.	Title	Length
10.	"Psaume 151" (Psalm 151)	12:01
11.	"L'Amour fou" (Mad Love)	4:46
12.	"La Folie" (Madness)	3:04

Original vinyl side four
No.	Title	Length
13.	"Écoute-moi" (Listen to Me)	3:57
14.	"Cette blessure" (This Wound)	3:58
15.	"Le Mal" (Evil)	2:29
16.	"Paris c'est une idée" (Paris It's an Idea)	1:49
17.	"Les Passantes" (The Women Passing By)	3:22
18.	"Sur la scène" (On Stage)	3:18
Total length:		69:05

CD 1
No.	Title	Length
1.	"Le Chien" (The Dog)	6:55
2.	"Petite" (Little Girl)	5:02
3.	"Poète, vos papiers !" (Poet, Your Documents!)	5:25
4.	"La Lettre" (The Letter)	3:26
5.	"La "The Nana"" (The Ultimate Doll)	4:27
6.	"La Mémoire et la Mer" (Memory and The Sea)	5:29
7.	"Rotterdam"	2:54
8.	"Paris, je ne t'aime plus" (Paris, I Don't Love You Anymore)	5:17
9.	"Le Crachat" (The Spit)	3:44
Total length:		43:22

CD 2
No.	Title	Length
1.	"Psaume 151" (Psalm 151)	12:01
2.	"L'Amour fou" (Mad Love)	4:46
3.	"La Folie" (Madness)	3:04
4.	"Écoute-moi" (Listen to Me)	3:57
5.	"Cette blessure" (This Open Wound)	3:58
6.	"Le Mal" (Evil)	2:29
7.	"Paris c'est une idée" (Paris It's an Idea)	1:49
8.	"Les Passantes" (The Women Passing By)	3:22
9.	"Sur la scène" (On Stage)	3:18

Bonus tracks :

No.	Title	Length
10.	"Avec le temps" (As Time Goes By)	4:23
11.	"L'Adieu" (The Farewell)	2:14
Total length:		48:46

== Personnel ==
- Zoo (tracks 1 and 5 on disk one):
  - André Hervé – organ, piano
  - Pierre Fanen – electric guitar
  - Michel Ripoche – trombone, tenor saxophone, electric violin
  - Daniel Carlet – saxophones, flute, electric violin
  - Michel Hervé – bass
  - Christian Devaux – drums
- Lionel Gali – violin (uncredited)
- Danielle Licari – vocals (uncredited)
- The orchestra consists of session musicians hired for the recording.

== Production ==
- Arranger & conductor: Jean-Michel Defaye
- Engineering: Gerhard Lehner, Claude Achallé (tracks 1 and 5, disk one)
- Executive producer: Richard Marsan
