= Mougins Center of Photography =

French gallery

- Centre de Photographie de Mougins
- Established: 2021
- Location: 43, rue de l'Église; 06250 Mougins, Alpes-Maritimes, France
- Coordinates: 43.60043°N 6.99530°E
- Website: centrephotographiemougins.com

The Mougins Center of Photography (Centre de Photographie de Mougins) is a photography gallery located in the village of Mougins, in the Alpes-Maritimes department, France. It opened in July 2021.

The building was previously home to the photography museum of André Villiers, which closed in 2018. The rehabilitation was financed by the municipality as well as by the Provence-Alps-French Riviera administrative region. Its inaugural exhibition was by Isabel Muñoz.

François Cheval is the gallery's artistic director and independent curator and Yasmine Chemali is its manager.

== See also ==
- Mougins Museum of Classical Art
