= Les Douze Premières Chansons de Léo Ferré =

Studio album by Léo Ferré
- Released: 1969
- Recorded: March 1969; Barclay Studio, Paris (France)
- Genre: Chanson
- Length: 39:49
- Label: Barclay Records

Léo Ferré chronology
Récital 1969 en public à Bobino (1969)	Les Douze Premières Chansons de Léo Ferré (1969)	Amour Anarchie (1970)

Les Douze Premières Chansons de Léo Ferré (English: The Twelve First Songs of Léo Ferré) is an album by Léo Ferré, released in 1969 by Barclay Records. The album is composed of re-recordings of songs taped by Ferré in 1950 on behalf of the label Le Chant du Monde for vinyl releases, with new orchestral arrangements.

== Track listing ==
All songs written and composed by Léo Ferré, except where noted otherwise.

Original LP

Side one
No.	Title	Writer(s)	Length
1.	"À Saint-Germain-des-Prés" (Saint-Germain-des-Prés)		3:16
2.	"Le Flamenco de Paris" (Paris Flamenco)		2:43
3.	"Monsieur Tout-Blanc" (Mister All-White)		3:50
4.	"L'Inconnue de Londres" (The Strangeress from London)		3:44
5.	"Les Forains" (The Carnies)		3:46
6.	"La Vie d'artiste" (Artist's life)	Léo Ferré & Francis Claude	2:23

Side two
No.	Title	Writer(s)	Length
7.	"La Chanson du scaphandrier" (Song of the Deep-Sea Diver)	René Baer	2:00
8.	"L'Esprit de famille" (Family Spirit)		3:13
9.	"Barbarie" (Barbarism)		3:19
10.	"Le Temps des roses rouges" (The Red Roses Times)		3:19
11.	"Le Bateau espagnol" (The Spanish Boat)		3:39
12.	"L'Île Saint-Louis" (The Île Saint-Louis)	Léo Ferré & Francis Claude	3:57

== Personnel ==
- The orchestra consists of session musicians hired for the recording.

== Production ==
- Arranger & conductor: Jean-Michel Defaye
- Engineering: Gerhard Lehner
- Executive producer: Richard Marsan
- Artwork: Patrick Ullmann
