= National Photography Awards =

National Photography Awards are given to photographers in India. These awards are given in 3 different categories, namely - Lifetime Achievement Award, Professional Photographer of the Year and Amateur Photographer of the Year. It may also include 5 Special Mention Awards in both Professional and Amateur categories.

Award ceremony is organized by Photo Division of Ministry of information and Broadcasting.

== Winners ==
Year	Lifetime Achievement Award	Professional Photographer of the Year	Amateur Photographer of the Year
2014	Rajesh Bedi	J. Suresh	Kingshuk Chakravarty
2015	Surendra R Patel	Swarup Duta	Sasikumar Ramachandran
2016	Bhawan Singh	Javed Ahmed Dar	Himanshu Thakur
2017	Raghu Rai	K K Mustafah	Ravinder Kumar
2018	Ashok Dilwali	SL Shanth Kumar	Gurdeep Dhiman
2019	Sipra Das	Sasi Kumar Ramachandran	Arun Saha
