= Les Chansons d'Aragon =

Studio album by Léo Ferré
- Released: February 1961
- Recorded: 10, 11 & 13 January 1961 at Barclay Studio, Paris (France)
- Genre: Chanson
- Length: 32:50
- Label: Barclay Records

Léo Ferré chronology
Paname (1960)	Les Chansons d'Aragon (1961)	La Langue française (1962)

Les Chansons d'Aragon (English: "Songs of Aragon") is an album by Léo Ferré, released in 1961 by Barclay Records. It is his second album dedicated to a poet, after Baudelaire's Les Fleurs du mal in 1957. Here, Ferré focuses on former surrealist Louis Aragon, but the body of work he chooses (poetry collection Le Roman inachevé, mostly) is not surrealistic.

This album had much more impact than Ferré's first Baudelaire effort, maybe because when it was published Ferré was gaining both success and critical acclaim on stage, and Aragon was an active poet and a controversial committed communist figure in the French intellectual field.

== History ==
Léo Ferré began to set Louis Aragon's poems to music in the fall of 1958 and completed the task in March 1959. At that time, Ferré was not under contract to a record label. After several refusals, Ferré ended up signing with Eddie Barclay in 1960. Barclay was sceptical about sung poetry and asked him to release an album of catchier middle-of-the-road tunes before he would release the Aragon record. Ferré obliged by recording the album Paname, which included classics such as "Paname" and "Jolie môme". Les Chansons d'Aragon was finally recorded in January 1961 and released in February 1961.

The finished album lists only 10 of the original 12 compositions. Ferré changed most of the original titles, and sometimes eliminated some verses or changed their order. Aragon, who was greatly impressed by Ferré’s adaptations, wrote a liner text wherein he recognized Ferré as a true poet and claimed that "the literary history of France [would] have to be re-written a little differently because of the contribution made by Léo Ferré".

This album is a landmark and is considered as an evergreen classic of the French song repertoire.

== Track listing ==
Texts by Louis Aragon. Music composed by Léo Ferré.

Side one
No.	Title	Length
1.	"L'Affiche rouge" (The Red Poster)	4:01
2.	"Tu n'en reviendras pas" (You won't return from this)	2:54
3.	"Est-ce ainsi que les hommes vivent ?" (Is this the way men live?)	3:31
4.	"Il n'aurait fallu" (Just one second more)	2:37
5.	"Les Fourreurs" (The Furriers)	2:36

Side two
No.	Title	Length
6.	"Blues"	3:46
7.	"Elsa"	2:41
8.	"L'Étrangère" (The Strangeress)	3:53
9.	"Je chante pour passer le temps" (I sing to pass time)	2:50
10.	"Je t'aime tant" (I love you so much)	3:32

== Personnel ==
- Barthélémy Rosso – guitar (uncredited)
- Jean Cardon – accordion (uncredited)
- The session musicians hired for the recording

== Credits ==
- Arranger & band conductor: Jean-Michel Defaye
- Director of engineering: Gerhard Lehner (uncredited)
- Executive producer: Jean Fernandez (uncredited)
- Cover photography: André Gornet
