= Les Fleurs du mal (suite et fin) =

2008 studio album by Léo Ferré

Studio album by Léo Ferré
- Released: April 10, 2008
- Recorded: Summer 1976 – January 1978; Castellina in Chianti, Italy
- Genre: Chanson
- Length: 58:30
- Label: La Mémoire et la Mer

Léo Ferré chronology
La Mauvaise Graine (2006)	Les Fleurs du mal (suite et fin) (2008)	Je parle à n'importe qui (2018)

Les Fleurs du mal (suite et fin) (English: "The Flowers of Evil (last and final)") is an album by Léo Ferré, posthumously released in 2008 by La Mémoire et la Mer. It is his third musical effort dedicated to Charles Baudelaire's poetry, after the seminal Les Fleurs du mal in 1957 and the expanding double LP Léo Ferré chante Baudelaire in 1967.

== History ==
This posthumous album brings together all the demo versions Léo Ferré recorded by himself, at home in Tuscany, between the summer of 1976 and winter 1977. The French singer-songwriter initially aimed to record a new baudelairian double album in 1977, as it was both anniversary dates of Les Fleurs du mal first publication (1857) and Baudelaire's death (1867). For unknown reasons, Ferré never completed this project. It remains a piano and a voice, bare and intimate.

Nevertheless, Ferré orchestrated and recorded twos demos here in 1986 (Je te donne ces vers afin que si mon nom and L'Examen de minuit - Bien loin d'ici), to release them on On n'est pas sérieux quand on a dix-sept ans.

== Track listing ==
Texts by Charles Baudelaire. Music composed and played by Léo Ferré at the piano.

No.	Title	Length
1.	"Une nuit que j'étais près d'une affreuse Juive" (One night when I lay beside a frightful Jewess...)	1:55
2.	"Sépulture" (Sepulchre)	1:53
3.	"La Cloche fêlée" (The Broken Bell)	2:01
4.	"L'Héautontimorouménos" (The Self-Tormenter)	2:02
5.	"À une mendiante rousse" (To a Mendicant Redhead)	3:35
6.	"Je n'ai pas oublié, voisine de la ville" (I have not forgotten, near the city...)	2:08
7.	"L'Âme du vin" (The Soul of Wine)	3:42
8.	"La Fontaine de sang" (The Fountain of Blood)	2:42
9.	"Madrigal triste" (Sad Madrigal)	3:17
10.	"L'Examen de minuit - Bien loin d'ici" (Midnight Examination of Conscience - Quite Far from Here)	3:24
11.	"L'Ennemi" (The Enemy)	2:36
12.	"Le Guignon" (Bad Luck)	2:20
13.	"Je t'adore à l'égal de la voûte nocturne" (I adore you as much as the nocturnal vault...)	1:39
14.	"Avec ses vêtements ondoyants et nacrés" (With her pearly undulating dresses...)	1:56
15.	"Le Vampire" (The Vampire)	1:43
16.	"Le Parfum" (The Perfume)	2:26
17.	"Je te donne ces vers afin que si mon nom" (I give you these verses so if my name...)	1:24
18.	"Réversibilité" (Reversibility)	3:30
19.	"Le Beau navire" (The Beautiful Ship)	5:01
20.	"L'Horloge" (The Clock)	3:08
21.	"Le Cygne" (The Swan)	6:05

== Credits ==
- Tape restoration and mastering at Studio La Buissonne
- Cover photography: Hubert Grooteclaes, Nadar
- Package Art & Design: Rinaldo Maria Chiesa & Vital Maladrech
- Liner notes: Mathieu Ferré, Alain Raemackers
- Compiled and Coordinated by Mathieu Ferré & Alain Raemackers
