= Léo Ferré chante Baudelaire =

1967 studio album by Léo Ferré

Studio album by Léo Ferré
- Released: 1967
- Recorded: June 1967; Barclay Studio, Paris (France)
- Genre: Chanson
- Length: 60:02
- Label: Barclay Records

Léo Ferré chronology
La Marseillaise (1967)	Léo Ferré chante Baudelaire (1967)	L'Été 68 (1969)

Léo Ferré chante Baudelaire (English: "Léo Ferré sings Baudelaire") is an album by Léo Ferré, released in 1967 by Barclay Records. It is his fourth LP dedicated to a poet, after a first Baudelaire effort in 1957 (Les Fleurs du mal), Les Chansons d'Aragon in 1961, and Verlaine et Rimbaud in 1964. It is also his second studio double album.

== Track listing ==
Texts by Charles Baudelaire. Music composed by Léo Ferré.

Original LP

Side one
No.	Title	Length
1.	"Spleen"	3:54
2.	"À une Malabaraise" (To a Lady of Malabar)	2:30
3.	"Épigraphe" (Epigraph for a Condemned Book)	0:51
4.	"L'Étranger" (The Stranger)	2:43
5.	"Tu mettrais l'univers" (You would take the entire world to bed with you...)	2:52
6.	"Le Chat" (The Cat)	4:34

Side two
No.	Title	Length
7.	"Le Soleil" (The Sun)	3:06
8.	"Le Vin de l'assassin" (The Murderer's Wine)	2:23
9.	"L'Albatros" (The Albatross)	2:22
10.	"À une passante" (To a Passerby)	2:10
11.	"Le Flacon" (The Perfume Flask)	3:18
12.	"La servante au grand cœur" (The kind-hearted servant of whom you were jealous...)	3:19

Side three
No.	Title	Length
1.	"Abel et Caïn" (Abel and Cain)	2:10
2.	"La Géante" (The Giantess)	2:12
3.	"Remords posthume" (Posthumous Remorse)	1:32
4.	"Les Bijoux" (The Jewels)	4:00
5.	"La Musique" (Music)	1:49
6.	"La Beauté" (Beauty)	2:26

Side four
No.	Title	Length
7.	"Causerie" (Conversation)	2:11
8.	"Recueillement" (Meditation)	2:30
9.	"La Muse vénale" (The Venal Muse)	1:22
10.	"Ciel brouillé" (Cloudy Sky)	2:27
11.	"Une charogne" (A Carcass)	2:25
12.	"Le Vert Paradis (Moesta et Errabunda)" (Grieving and Wandering)	3:55

== Personnel ==
- The orchestra consists of session musicians hired for the recording

== Credits ==
- Arranger & orchestra conductor: Jean-Michel Defaye
- Director of engineering: Gerhard Lehner
- Executive producer: Jean Fernandez
- Artwork: Vanni Tealdi (first edition), Charles Szymkowicz (second edition)
