= Barthélémy Rosso =

- Born: Monaco
- Died: 1971
- Genres: jazz, classical
- Instrument: guitar
- Years active: 1940s–1971

Barthélémy Rosso, a/k/a Mimi Rosso (b. Monaco, d. 1971), was a French guitarist and arranger of jazz and classical music. Although he played occasionally with Sidney Bechet, he is best known today for having worked with Léo Ferré and Georges Brassens.
