= Les Fleurs du mal (Léo Ferré album) =

1957 studio album by Léo Ferré

Studio album by Léo Ferré
- Released: 1957
- Recorded: March 21, 22, 27, 1957; Pathé Magellan Studio, Paris (France)
- Genre: Chanson
- Length: 35:53
- Label: Odeon Records (1957); La Mémoire et la Mer (2008)

Léo Ferré chronology
Les Fleurs du mal (1957)	La Chanson du mal-aimé (1957)

Les Fleurs du mal (English: The Flowers of Evil) is an album by Léo Ferré, released in 1957 by Odeon Records. It is his first LP dedicated to a poet and this is the first time in popular music history a whole album is dedicated to a dead poet. Léo Ferré has set Baudelaire into music two more times : in 1967 with double album Léo Ferré chante Baudelaire, and with unfinished project Les Fleurs du mal (suite et fin), recorded in 1977 but posthumously released in 2008.

== Track listing ==
Texts by Charles Baudelaire. Music composed by Léo Ferré.

Original LP

Side one
No.	Title	Length
1.	"Harmonie du soir" (Evening Harmony)	2:56
2.	"Le serpent qui danse" (The Dancing Serpent)	2:51
3.	"Les Hiboux" (The Owls)	2:54
4.	"Le Léthé" (Lethe)	3:56
5.	"Le Revenant" (The Ghost)	2:01
6.	"La Mort des amants" (The Death of Lovers)	3:51

Side two
No.	Title	Length
7.	"L'Invitation au voyage" (Invitation to the Voyage)	3:39
8.	"Les Métamorphoses du vampire" (The Vampire's Metamorphoses)	3:14
9.	"À celle qui est trop gaie" (To She Who Is Too Gay)	3:54
10.	"La Vie antérieure" (Past Life)	3:21
11.	"La Pipe" (The Pipe)	1:22
12.	"Brumes et pluies" (Mists and Rains)	1:58

== Personnel ==
- Léo Ferré - voice, piano
- Jean-Michel Defaye - piano
- Jean Cardon - accordion
- Barthélémy Rosso - guitar
- Pierre Gossez - tenor saxophone
- Janine de Waleyne - ondes Martenot
- Fred Ermelin - double bass
