= Jean-Michel Defaye =

French pianist and composer (1932–2025)

- Defaye in the 1950s
- Born: 18 September 1932; Saint-Mandé, France
- Died: 1 January 2025 (aged 92)
- Education: Conservatoire de Paris
- Occupations: Pianist; Composer; Conductor

Jean-Michel Defaye (18 September 1932 – 1 January 2025) was a French pianist, composer, arranger and conductor known for his collaboration with French poet and singer-songwriter Léo Ferré.

== Life and career ==
Defaye was born in Saint-Mandé, Val-de-Marne, near Paris, on 18 September 1932. At aged ten he entered the Paris Conservatoire and completed his musical training in theory, piano and composition, taking in Nadia Boulanger's accompaniment class. In his early years, he was interested in jazz. Defaye's primary instrument was the piano, but he also played trombone and trumpet. He attended the composition classes of Darius Milhaud and Tony Aubin. In 1952 he won second prize of the Grand Prix de Rome; and the following year he won the Lili Boulanger Prize of Harvard and the second prize in composition for the Belgian Queen Elisabeth Competition.

As a composer he wrote mostly for brass, especially trombone; he wrote pieces for trombone and piano in the style of classical composers such as Bach, Brahms, Debussy, Schumann, Stravinsky and Vivaldi. He composed chamber music with brass instruments, pieces for competitions, concertos for clarinet, saxophone, trumpet and trombone, and many educational pieces. His writing was often influenced by jazz.

Defaye wrote several film scores, including Pouic-Pouic. As an arranger, he worked for decades with singer-songwriter Léo Ferré. He also collaborated with Juliette Gréco, Zizi Jeanmaire and Les Branquignols.

Defaye died on 1 January 2025, at the age of 92.

== Classical compositions ==
Compositions by Defaye include:

- Suite Marine
- Morceau de Concours I (SG 1–2)
- Morceau de Concours II (SG 3–4)
- Morceau de Concours III (SG 5)
- Deux Danses, for trombone and piano (1954)
- Quatre pièces, for trombone quartet (1954)
- Sonatine for trumpet and piano (1956)
- Mouvement, for trombone and piano (1972)
- Fluctuations, for solo trombone, 6 trombones and 2 percussions (1987)
- À la manière de Bach, for trombone and piano (1990)
- Suite entomologique, for trombone and piano (1992)
- Œuvre de concours I, for trombone and piano (1993)
- Œuvre de concours II, for trombone and piano (1993)
- Œuvre de concours III, for trombone and piano (1993)
- À la manière de Schumann, for trombone and piano (2000)
- À la manière de Debussy, for trombone and piano (2001)
- À la manière de Vivaldi, for trombone and piano (2002)
- À la manière de Stravinsky, for trombone and piano (2005)
- À la manière de Brahms, for trombone and piano (2011)
- Musique à Curitiba, for trombone solo and 16 trombones

== Film scores ==
Defaye composed film scores including:

- 1961: Tire-au-flanc 62 (The Army Game)
- 1963: Les Veinards (People in Luck)
- 1963: Pouic-Pouic
- 1965: Le Bonheur
- 1965: Fifi la plume (Circus Angel)
- 1977: Arrête ton char... bidasse!

== Discography ==
Dafaye collaborated as pianist, arranger and musical leader for albums and recitals by Léo Ferré, including:

- 1957: Les Fleurs du mal
- 1960: Paname
- 1961: Les Chansons d'Aragon
- 1961: Léo Ferré à l'Alhambra (live)
- 1962: La Langue française
- 1964: Ferré 64
- 1964: Verlaine et Rimbaud
- 1966: Léo Ferré 1916-19...
- 1967: La Marseillaise
- 1967: Léo Ferré chante Baudelaire
- 1969: L'Été 68
- 1969: Les Douze Premières Chansons de Léo Ferré
- 1970: Amour Anarchie
- 1972: La Solitudine
- 2003: Les Chansons interdites... et autres (recorded in 1961)
