= Léo Ferré =

Monégasque musician and poet (1916–1993)

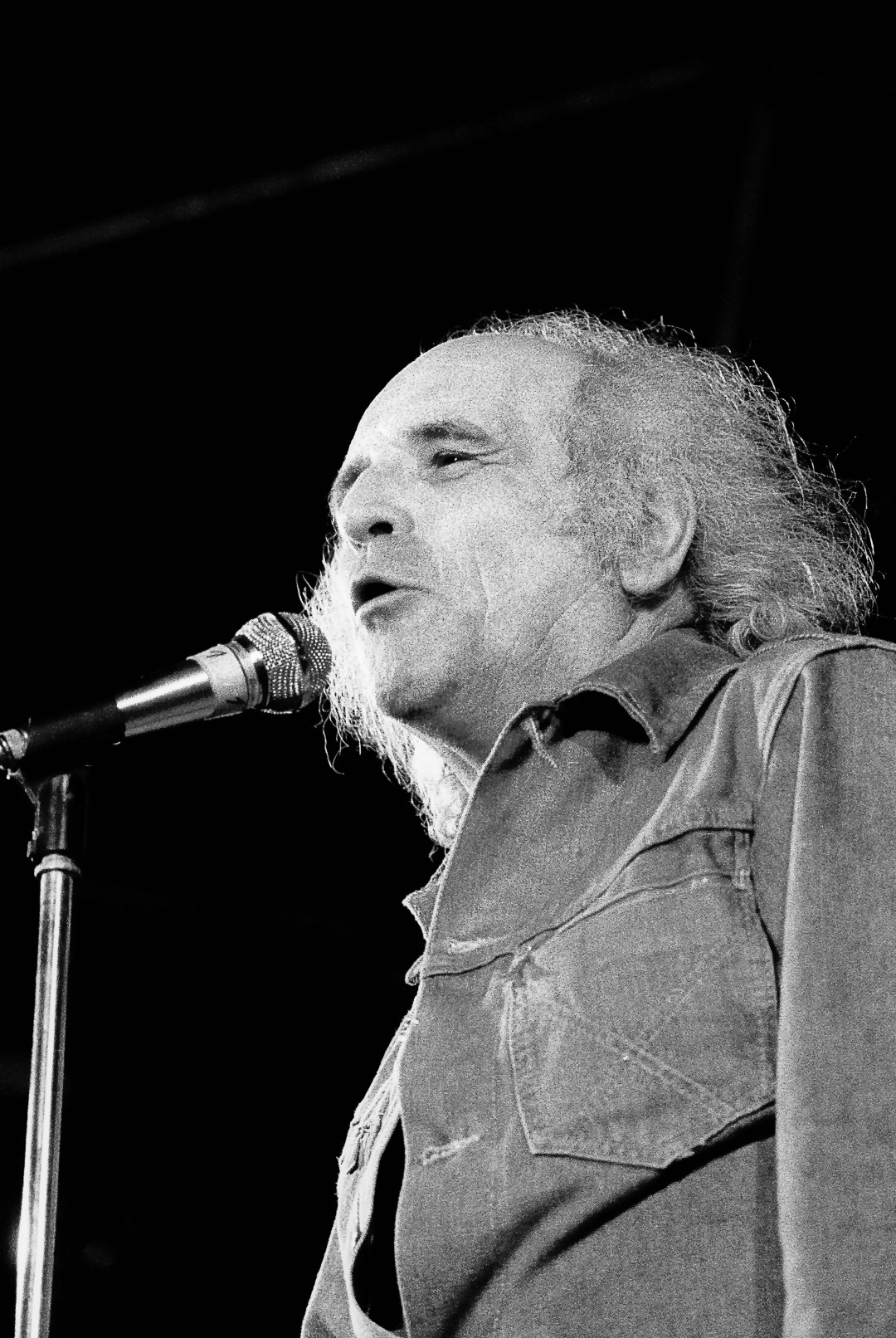
- Ferré in 1973

Background information
- Born: 24 August 1916; Monaco
- Died: 14 July 1993 (aged 76) Castellina in Chianti, Italy
- Genres: Chanson, expressionist, classical, spoken word, pop
- Occupations: Musician, singer-songwriter, composer, conductor
- Instruments: Piano, vocals
- Years active: 1946–1991
- Labels: Le Chant du Monde, Odeon, Barclay, CBS, RCA, EPM, La Mémoire et la Mer
- Website: www.leo-ferre.com

Léo Ferré (French: [leo feʁe]; 24 August 1916 – 14 July 1993) was a Monégasque poet and composer, and a dynamic and controversial live performer. He released some forty albums over this period, composing the music and the majority of the lyrics. He released many hit singles, particularly between 1960 and the mid-1970s. Some of his songs have become classics of the French chanson repertoire, including "Avec le temps", "C'est extra", "Jolie Môme" and "Paris-Canaille".

== Early life ==
Ferré was the son of Joseph Ferré, French staff manager at Monte Carlo Casino, and Marie Scotto, a Monégasque dressmaker of Italian descent from Piedmont; he had a sister, Lucienne, two years older.

Ferré had an early interest in music. At age seven, he joined the choir of the Monaco Cathedral and discovered polyphony through singing pieces by Giovanni Pierluigi da Palestrina and Tomás Luis de Victoria. His uncle, former violinist and secretary at the Casino, used to bring him to performances and rehearsals at the Monte Carlo Opera. Ferré listened to such musicians as bass singer Feodor Chaliapin, discovered Beethoven under the baton of Arturo Toscanini (Coriolanus), and was deeply moved by the Fifth Symphony. But it was the sweet presence of composer Maurice Ravel during L'Enfant et les Sortilèges rehearsals that impressed him the most.

At age nine, Ferré entered Saint-Charles College of Bordighera, run by the Brothers of the Christian Schools in Italy. He remained there for eight long years of severe discipline and boredom. He wrote about this lonely and caged childhood in an autofiction (Benoît Misère, 1970). He graduated from high school in Monaco, but his father did not let him attend the Conservatory of Music.

== Career ==
In 1945, while still a "farmer" and a Jack-of-all-trades at Radio Monte-Carlo, Ferré met Edith Piaf, who encouraged him to try his luck in Paris.

In April 1947, Ferré agreed to tour in Martinique, which turned out to be disastrous. From the end of 1947 Ferré produced and hosted on Paris Inter station several cycles of programs devoted to classical music. In Musique Byzantine (1953–54), he expanded his topics on aesthetics, such as tonality necessity, exotic melody, opera (the "song of rich people"), boredom, and originality or "marshmallow music".

In 1950, to submit Verdi examination at La Scala in Milan, he wrote the libretto and music of an opera called La Vie d'artiste (same title as the song). It transposed his past years' experience into a kind of a black comedy but Ferré did not seem to like it much, finally abandoning it for other projects. He began to sing in larger venues such as l'Olympia, as the opening act of Josephine Baker in 1954. In 1956, Ferré wrote and composed La Nuit (The Night), a ballet with sung sections commissioned by choreographer Roland Petit, but which failed to find an audience. In the late 1950s, he began releasing protest songs. In the song Chanson vulgaire (T’as voté), he invoked anarchist criticisms of voting, singing "if you voted, it’s because you thought you had some choice, so don’t complain". In the early 1960s, he denounced the French prosecution of the Algerian War in the songs Regardez-les, Les Temps difficiles and Mon général. He also wrote anti-Francoist songs, condemning the dictatorship of Francisco Franco in Franco, la muerte and L'Espoir.

From 1960 to 1970, Ferré worked with arranger Jean-Michel Defaye, whose classical skills and taste fit well with Ferré's musical sensitivity (they were both fans of Maurice Ravel's works for example). They maintained a steady pace of creation, recording almost an album a year, sometimes more. This artistic output, including the way Ferré would write for symphonic orchestras after 1970, would have an influence in the English-speaking world over such singer-songwriters as Scott Walker, Martin Newell and Benjamin Clementine.

In March 1968, Ferré did not return home after a gig. In his absence, Ferré's chimpanzee Pépée suffered a fall and refused to be approached. Eventually, Madeleine asked a hunter neighbour to put the chimpanzee out of its misery. Ferré's requiem for the primate would be his eponymous song "Pépée". The singer blamed his wife for Pépée's death and they would divorce after lengthy procedures.

During the civil unrest of May 1968, Ferré was invited by radical students to speak before a political demonstration, but he declined the offer. Ferré's sympathies with anarchism were well known and a recurring theme in his songs, but he was not a political activist; his anarchism was a purely personal philosophy. In his 1967 song about the French anarchist movement, Les Anarchistes, he sang that "y’en a pas un sur cent et pourtant ils existent" (English: "There isn't one in a hundred, and yet they exist"). After the May 1968 uprising, he released songs invoking revolution L’Été 68 and Comme une fille. He expressed anti-clericalism in the song Monsieur Tout-blanc, which criticised the Catholic Church for collaborating with Nazi Germany, and in the anarchist anthem Ni Dieu ni Maître, he denounced capital punishment. Although briefly a member of the French Communist Party and a supporter of the Maoist paper La Cause du peuple, he remained a committed anti-authoritarian, mocking leading Marxist figures such as Vladimir Lenin and Mao Zedong.

In 1969, Ferré settled in Tuscany, in Italy. The huge success of "C'est extra", an erotic ballad, greatly expanded his audience, especially among the French youth, who recognized in the poet the "prophet" of his own rebellion. Backed by this new energy, Ferré began to smash traditional song structures to explore spoken word and long monologues. With very precise work on the voice (rhythm, speech) and rhetorical writing derived from the prose of poet Arthur Rimbaud, Ferré ritualized his speaking in an incantatory and dramatic fashion.

In 1975 Ferré conducted successively the orchestra of the Institut des Hautes Études Musicales in Montreux, the Orchestre Philharmonique de Liège, and the Pasdeloup Orchestra at the Palais des congrès de Paris. It was a perilous challenge for Ferré, who conducted the orchestra and sang at the same time. He mixed Ravel's piano concerto for the Left Hand and Beethoven's Coriolan Overture with his own compositions and reversed the placement of the orchestra. 140 musicians and choir singers were on stage. This was an unprecedented performance, breaking free from conventions and blending separated worlds. Concerts were sold out for five weeks, but critics from the classical music field rejected this hybrid show.

From 1976 to 1979 he toured less. He drifted from his violently declamatory expression of revolt to avoid being typecast.

In 1976, Ferré signed with CBS Records International. From then until the end of his career the majority of his recordings would be made with the Milan-based RAI National Symphony Orchestra under his conducting. CBS soon dropped Ferré, whose commercial potential was estimated too low (his new aesthetics of symphonic down-tempo being against the current of all musical trends, it was complicated to put the artist on the radio and reduced the possibility of a hit). Being dropped by the "professionals", and disgusted for good with being "a merchandise for producers", Ferré refused to accept French song prizes. He also refused the proposal to enter the Ordre des Arts et des Lettres (at the highest grade) and to support President of France François Mitterrand in his reelection campaign in exchange for leading and conducting of a first-class symphonic orchestra. He refused being guest of honor in the Victoires de la musique (Music's Victories), annual French award ceremony recognizing the best musical artists of the year. Ferré used to say: "The only honor for an artist is not getting any".

Léo Ferré died at his home in July 1993 at the age of 76. He was buried at the Monaco Cemetery.

== Discography ==
=== Studio albums ===
- 1953: Paris Canaille (album) (Odeon Records|Odeon)
- 1954: Chansons de Léo Ferré (Le Chant Du Monde)
- 1954: Le Piano du pauvre (Odeon)
- 1956: Le Guinche (Huit Chansons nouvelles) (Odeon)
- 1956: Poète... vos papiers ! (Odeon)
- 1957: Les Fleurs du mal
- 1957: La Chanson du mal-aimé
- 1958: Encore... du Léo Ferré
- 1960: Paname
- 1961: Les Chansons d'Aragon
- 1962: La Langue française
- 1964: Ferré 64
- 1964: Verlaine et Rimbaud (2×LP)
- 1966: Léo Ferré 1916-19…
- 1967: Cette chanson (La Marseillaise)
- 1967: Léo Ferré chante Baudelaire (2×LP)
- 1969: L'Été 68
- 1969: Les Douze Premières Chansons de Léo Ferré
- 1970: Amour Anarchie (2×LP)
- 1971: La Solitude
- 1972: La Chanson du mal-aimé
- 1972: La Solitudine
- 1973: Il n'y a plus rien
- 1973: Et… basta !
- 1974: L'Espoir
- 1975: Ferré muet... dirige
- 1976: Je te donne
- 1977: La musica mi prende come l'amore
- 1977: La Frime
- 1979: Il est six heures ici et midi à New York
- 1980: La Violence et l'Ennui
- 1982: Ludwig-L'imaginaire-Le bateau ivre (3×LP)
- 1983: L'Opéra du pauvre (4×LP)
- 1985: Les Loubards
- 1986: On n'est pas sérieux quand on a dix-sept ans (2×LP)
- 1990: Les Vieux Copains
- 1991: Une saison en enfer

=== Live albums ===
- 1955: Récital Léo Ferré à l'Olympia
- 1958: Léo Ferré à Bobino
- 1961: Récital Léo Ferré à l'Alhambra
- 1963: Flash ! Alhambra – A.B.C.
- 1969: Récital 1969 en public à Bobino (2×LP)
- 1973: Seul en scène (Olympia 1972) (2×LP)
- 1984: Léo Ferré au Théâtre des Champs-Élysées (3×LP)
- 1988: Léo Ferré en public au TLP Déjazet

=== Posthumous releases ===
- 1993: Alors, Léo... (live at the TLP Déjazet 1990, 2xCD)
- 2000: Métamec (unreleased album demo tapes)
- 2000: Le Temps des roses rouges (78s songs from 1950)
- 2001: Sur la scène... (live at Lausanne 1973, 2×CD)
- 2001: Un chien à Montreux (live at Montreux 1973, EP)
- 2003: Les Chansons interdites… et autres (songs from 1961 previously published on Eps)
- 2004: De sac et de cordes (radio drama from 1951)
- 2004: Maudits soient-ils ! (Verlaine et Rimbaud album demo tapes, 2×CD)
- 2006: La Mauvaise Graine (radio sessions & interviews from 1959)
- 2008: Les Fleurs du mal (suite et fin) (unreleased album demo tapes, 1976–77)
- 2018: Je parle à n'importe qui (unreleased album demo tape, 1977)

=== Boxed sets, compilations, and rarities ===
- 2013: L'Indigné (20xCD)
- 2018: La Vie moderne: intégrale 1944-1959 (14CD covering the 15 first artist's years)
- 2020: L'Âge d'or: intégrale 1960-1967 (16CD covering the next eight artist's years)
- 2021: La Solitude: intégrale 1968-1974 (18CD covering the next seven artist's years)
- 2022: La Marge : intégrale 1975-1991 (20CD covering the last sixteen active artist's years)

== See also ==
- "L'Affiche Rouge" (poem)
