= La Chanson du mal-aimé =

La Chanson du mal-aimé (English: Song of the Poorly Loved) is an oratorio composed by Léo Ferré in 1952–53 on Guillaume Apollinaire's eponymous poem. This piece for four soloist singers, choir and orchestra is an example of an oratorio that is not based on a religious subject. It was created on stage in the Opéra de Monte-Carlo (Monaco), on 29 April 1954, then was recorded and released on an LP for the first time in 1957. Ferré recorded an alternate version in 1972, wherein he sang all by himself (and slightly changed the orchestration), instead of using any classical singers.

== Analysis ==
=== Roles ===
- The Poorly Loved (baryton)
- The Woman (soprano)
- The Angel (soprano)
- The Double (baryton)

== Recordings ==
- Léo Ferré, Orchestre national et chœurs de l'Opéra de Monte-Carlo, Bernard Demigny (the Poor-Loved), Nadine Sautereau (the Woman), Jacques Douai (the Angel), Henri B. Etcheverry (the Double). Live at Opéra de Monte-Carlo, 1954 (La Mémoire et la Mer, 2006)
- Léo Ferré, Orchestre national de la Radiodiffusion française and Raymond Saint-Paul Choir, Camille Maurane (the Poor-Loved), Michel Roux (the Double), Nadine Sautereau (the Woman), Jacques Petitjean (the Angel), 1957 (Odeon Records)
- Léo Ferré, Orchestre Lamoureux, Janine de Waleyne (soprano), 1972 (Barclay Records)
- Dag Achatz (piano), Léo Ferré, Janine de Waleyne. Live at the Opéra-Comique of Paris, 1974 (unreleased)
- Léo Ferré, Pasdeloup Orchestra, Janine de Waleyne, Ensemble vocal Alborada, Olympos Choir, Ensemble vocal Raphaël Passaquet. Live at the Palais des congrès de Paris, 1975 (unreleased)
- Gianluigi Gelmetti, Monte-Carlo Philharmonic Orchestra, Laurent Deleuil (the Poor-Loved), Jean-Luc Chaignaud (the Double), Alessandro Luciano (the Angel), Danielle Streiff and Katarzyna Medlarska (the Woman), 2014 (OPMC Classics)

== See also ==
- Reply of the Zaporozhian Cossacks
