= List of songs recorded by Stereophonics =

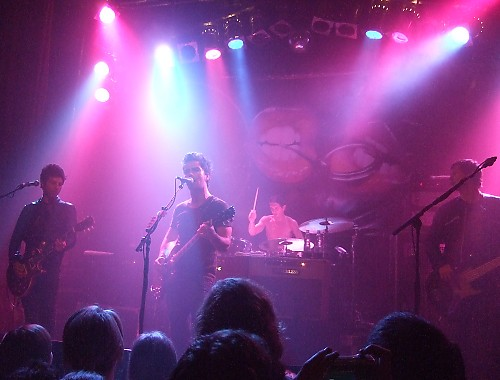
Stereophonics performing in Hamburg, Germany on 13 September 2007.

This is a comprehensive list of songs recorded by Welsh rock band Stereophonics. This list includes songs from the band's thirteen studio albums, one compilation album, one live album, B-sides from twenty-three of forty singles (Note: Total number of singles released by the band includes the re-release of "Local Boy in the Photograph".) plus other featured appearances.

As the first act signed to V2 Records, Stereophonics started officially releasing songs in 1996 with their first double A-side single, "Looks like Chaplin", which was not applicable to chart. Their second single, "Local Boy in the Photograph", charted at number fifty-one on the UK Singles Chart and has since been viewed as a classic. The debut album Word Gets Around was released in 1997 and reached number six in the UK Albums Chart. At the 1998 Brit Awards the band were nominated for "Best British Newcomer" and at the NME Brat Awards for "Best New Band", subsequently winning the former.

The band gained commercial success after "The Bartender and the Thief", the lead-single from the follow-up to Word Gets Around, reached number three and remains one of their highest charting singles.

== Songs ==
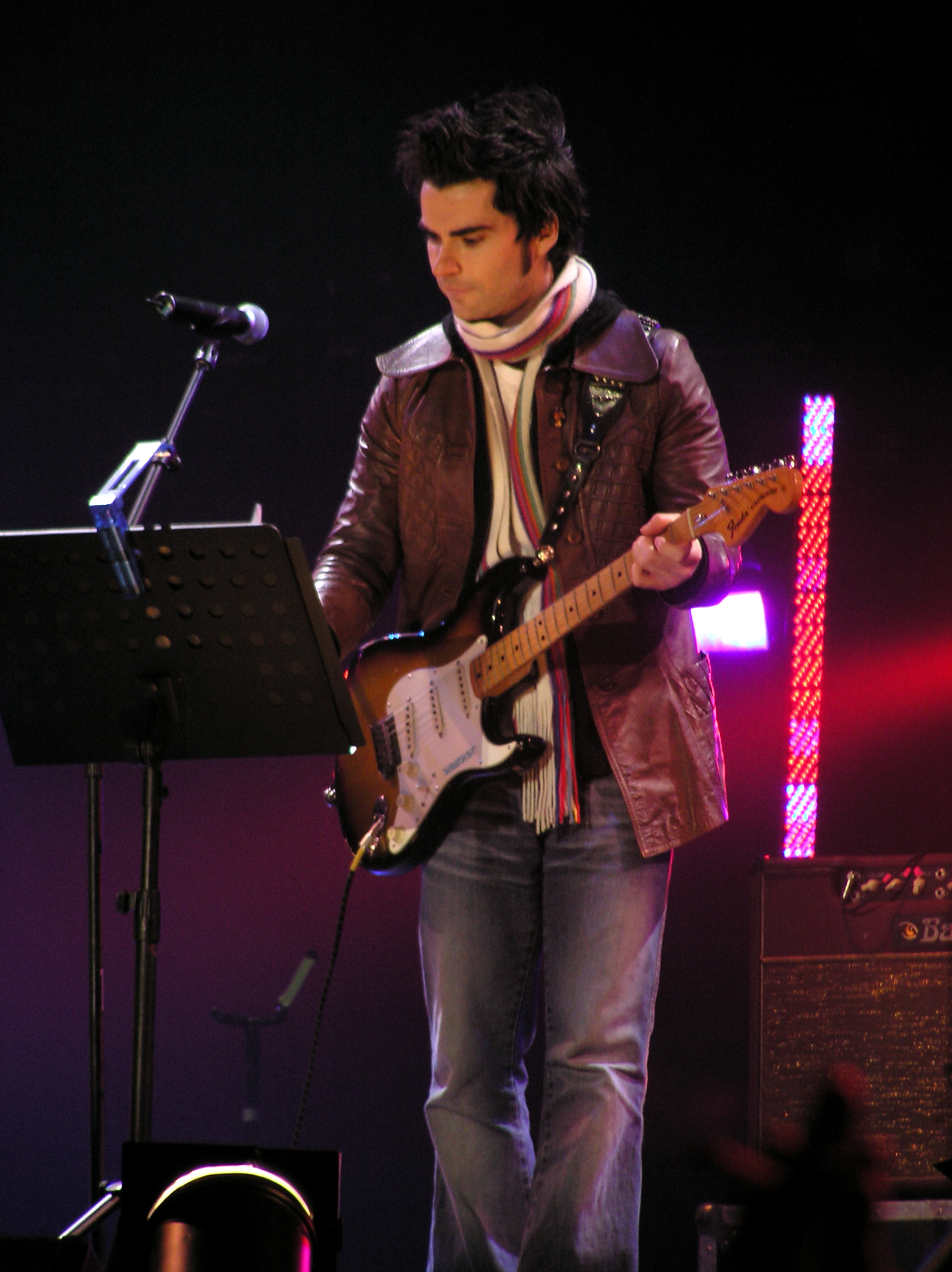
Lead singer and guitarist Kelly Jones writes all the lyrics and since Just Enough Education to Perform (2001) he has been composing most of the music himself for the band. He's been producing the band's albums from You Gotta Go There to Come Back (2003) onwards.

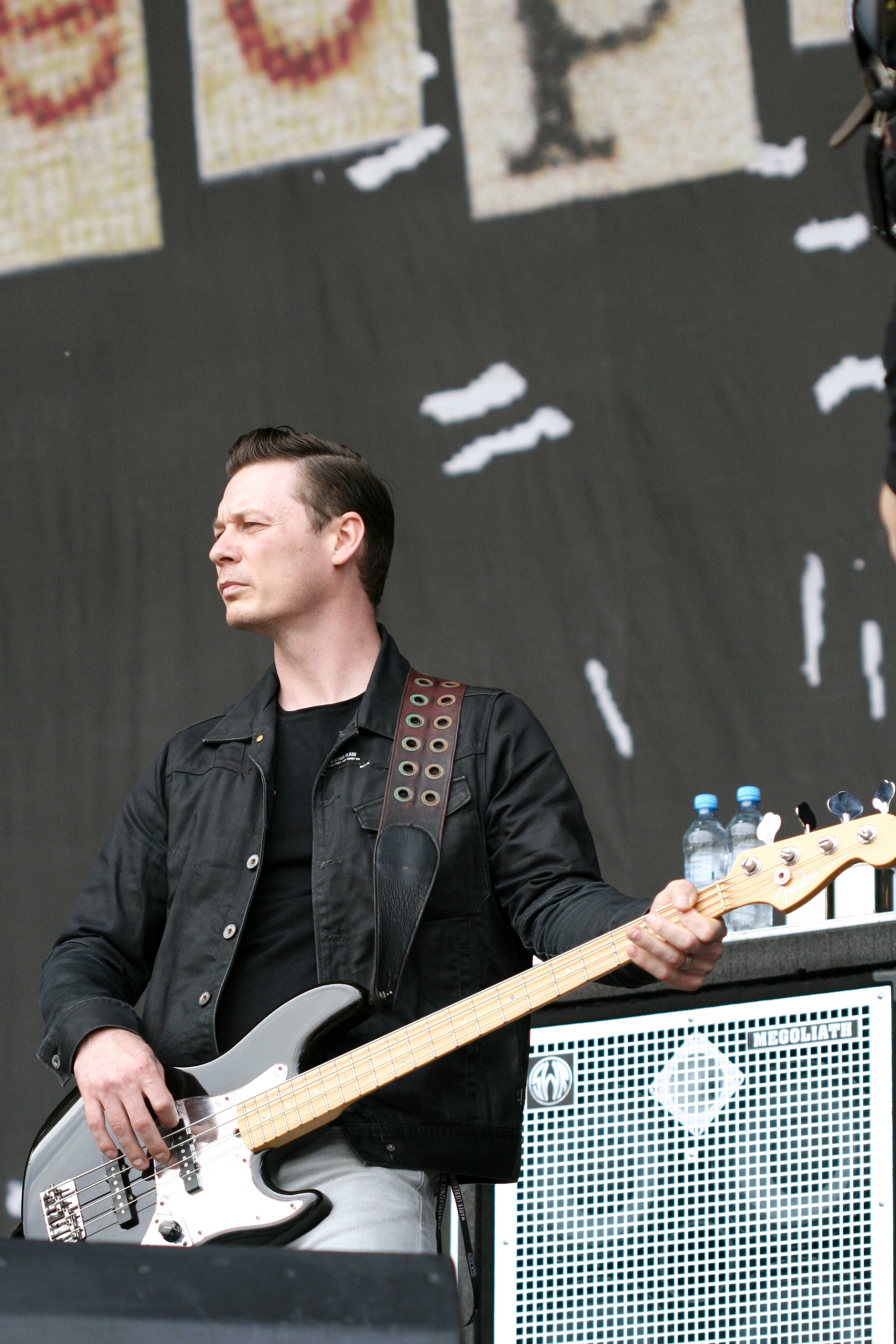
Bass guitarist Richard Jones (no relation to Kelly Jones) is one of the surviving members from the original Stereophonics line-up along with Kelly Jones. He wrote the music with Stuart Cable and Kelly Jones for Word Gets Around and Performance and Cocktails, their first two albums.

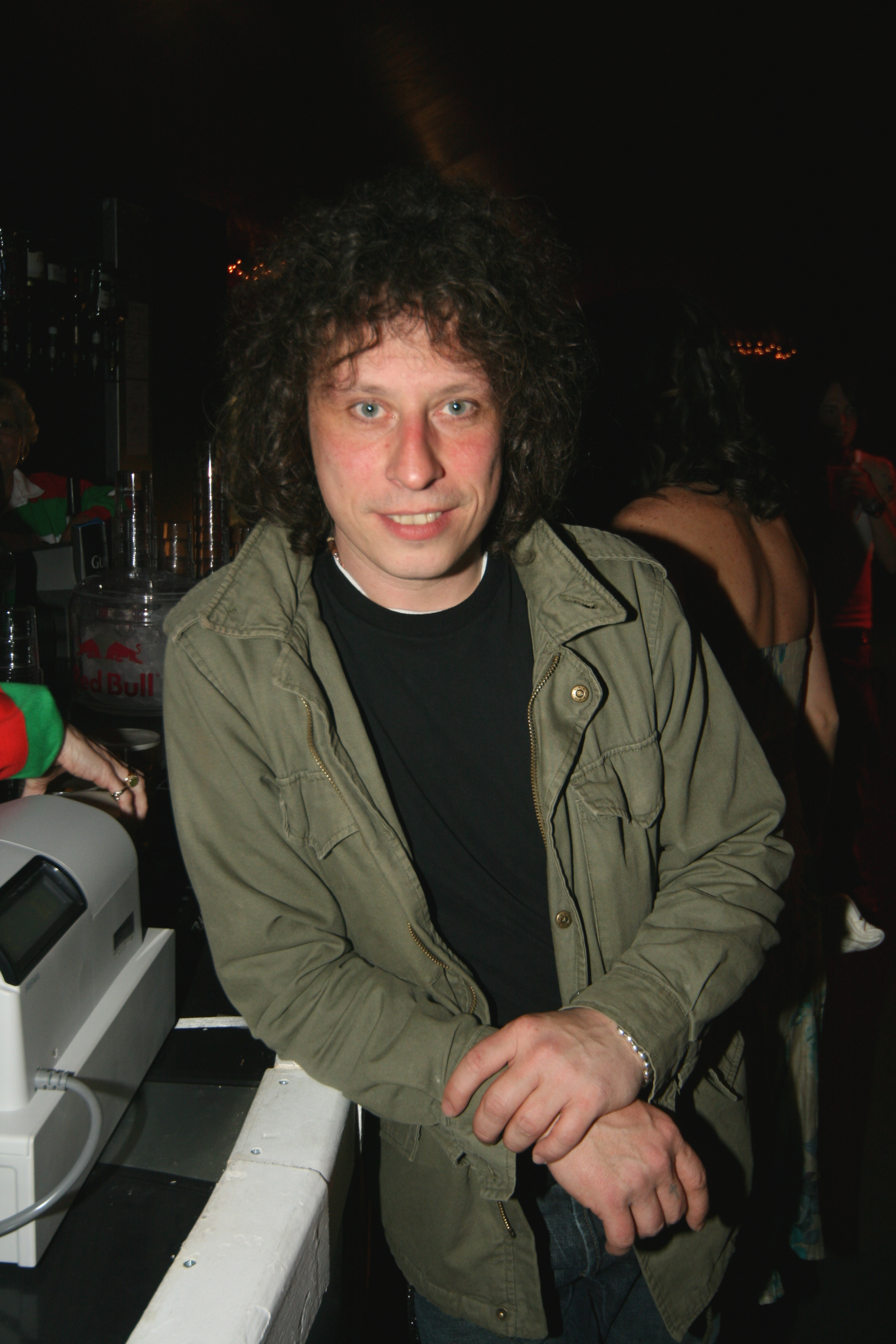
Stuart Cable was a founding member and came up with the band name The Stereophonics after reading it on his gramophone. He wrote the music with Kelly Jones and Richard Jones for their first two albums and provided drums until he was kicked in 2003. He died in 2010.

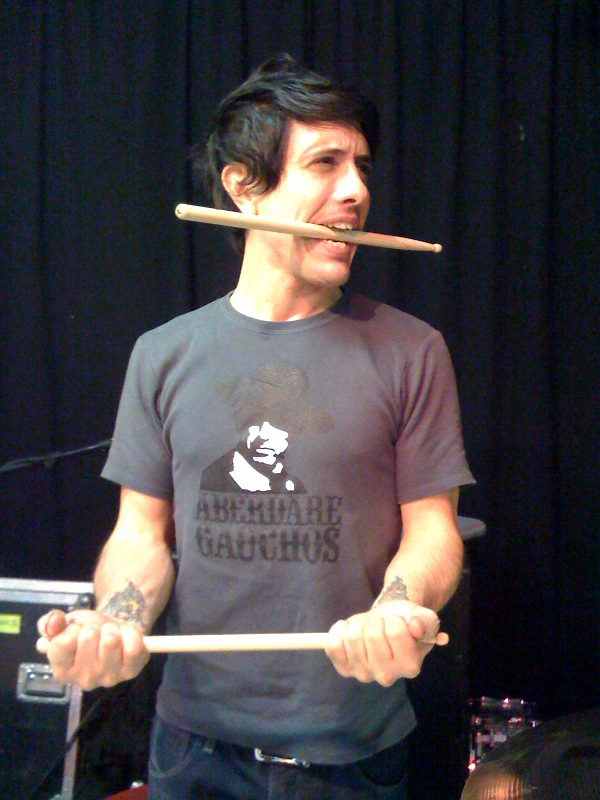
Javier Weyler provided drums for Stereophonics from 2004 to 2012 after being a studio assistant for the You Gotta Go There to Come Back sessions and co-wrote the music to "I Could Lose Ya" with Kelly Jones and Richard Jones.

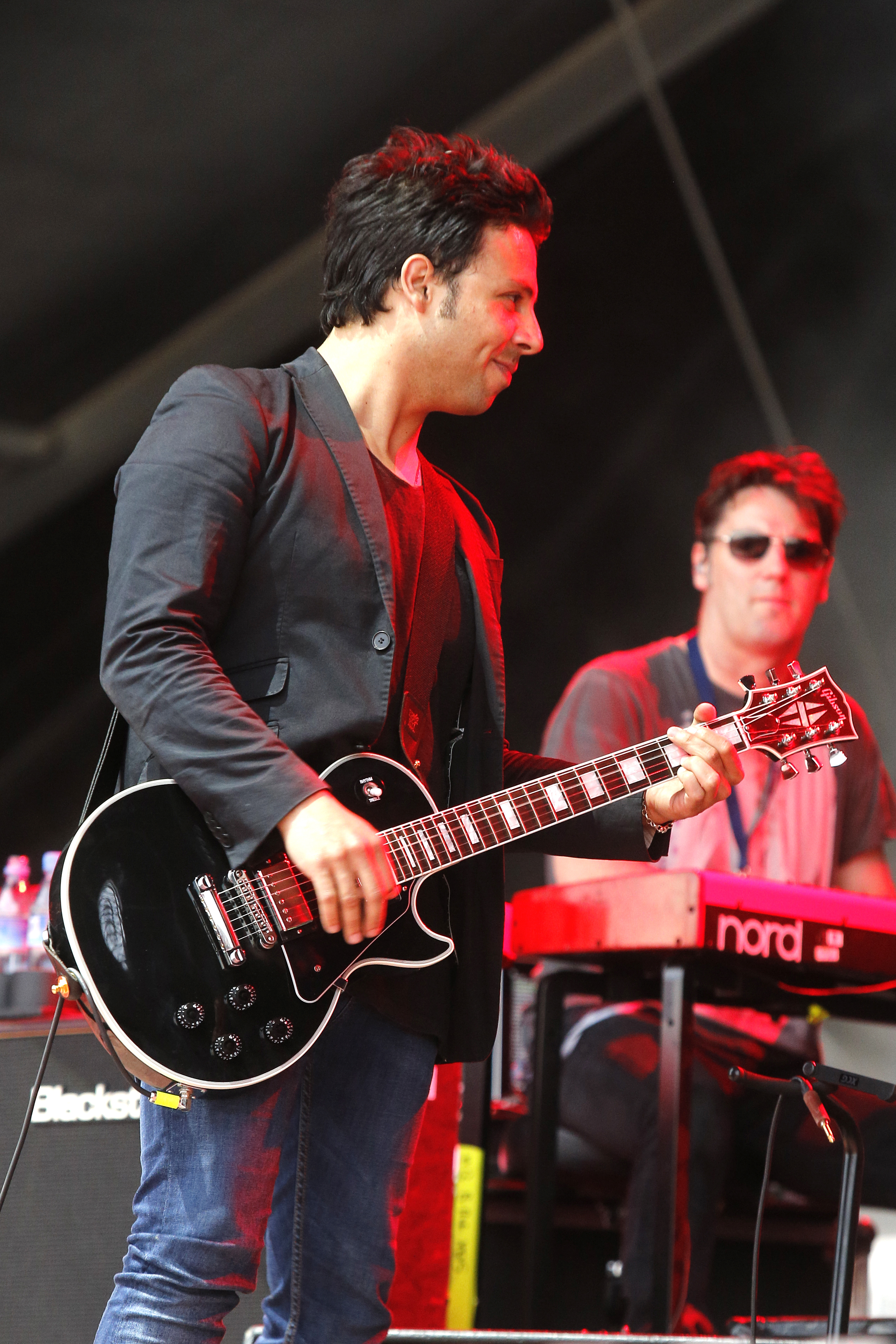
Guitarist Adam Zindani joined in 2007, making Stereophonics a four-piece band and co-wrote the music to "My Own Worst Enemy" and "Taken a Tumble" with Kelly Jones. Tony Kirkham (keyboards) joined the band as a touring musician in 1999 and has been providing additional instruments to album tracks from Graffiti on the Train (2013) onward.

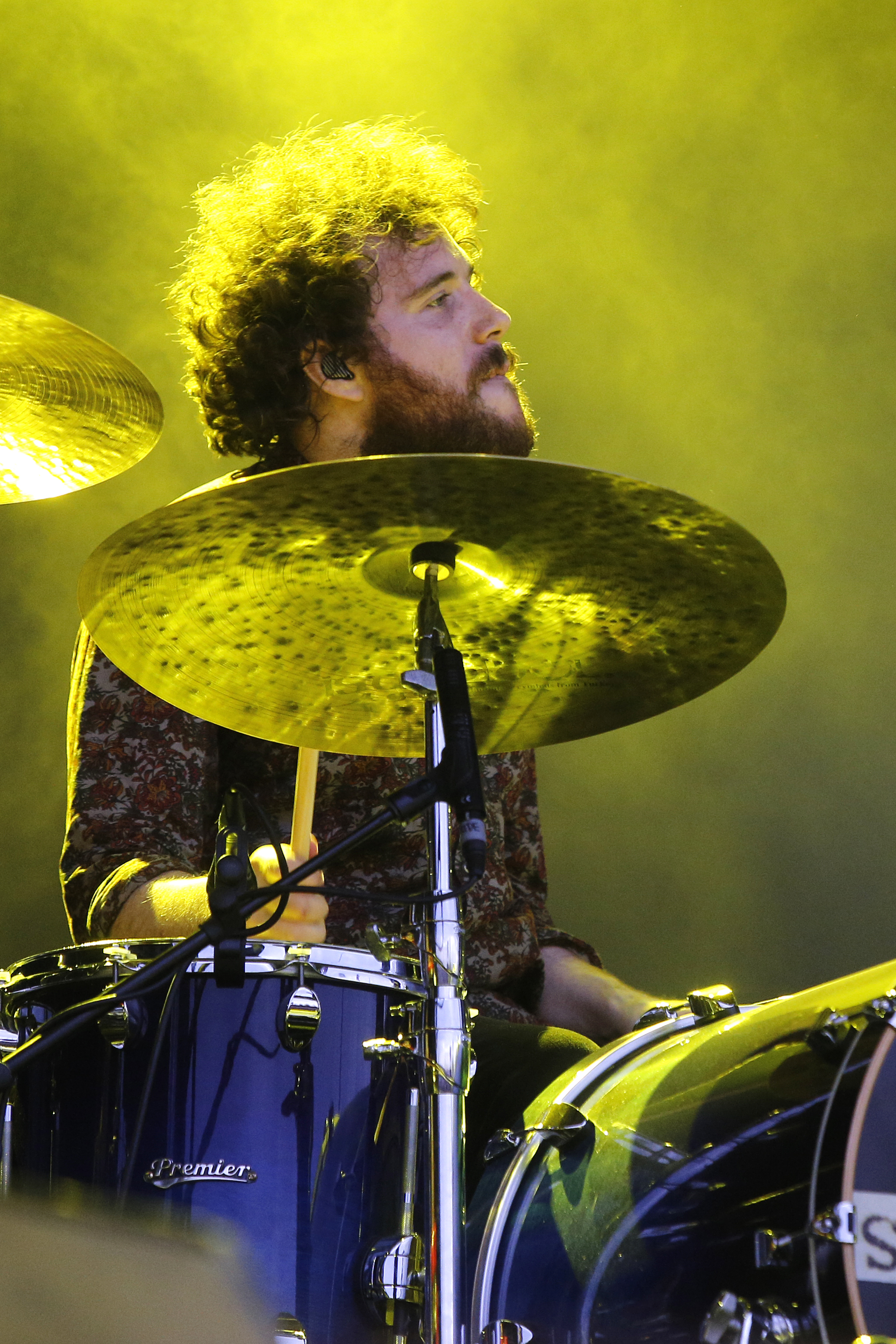
Originally from the Noisettes, current drummer Jamie Morrison replaced Javier Weyler in 2012.

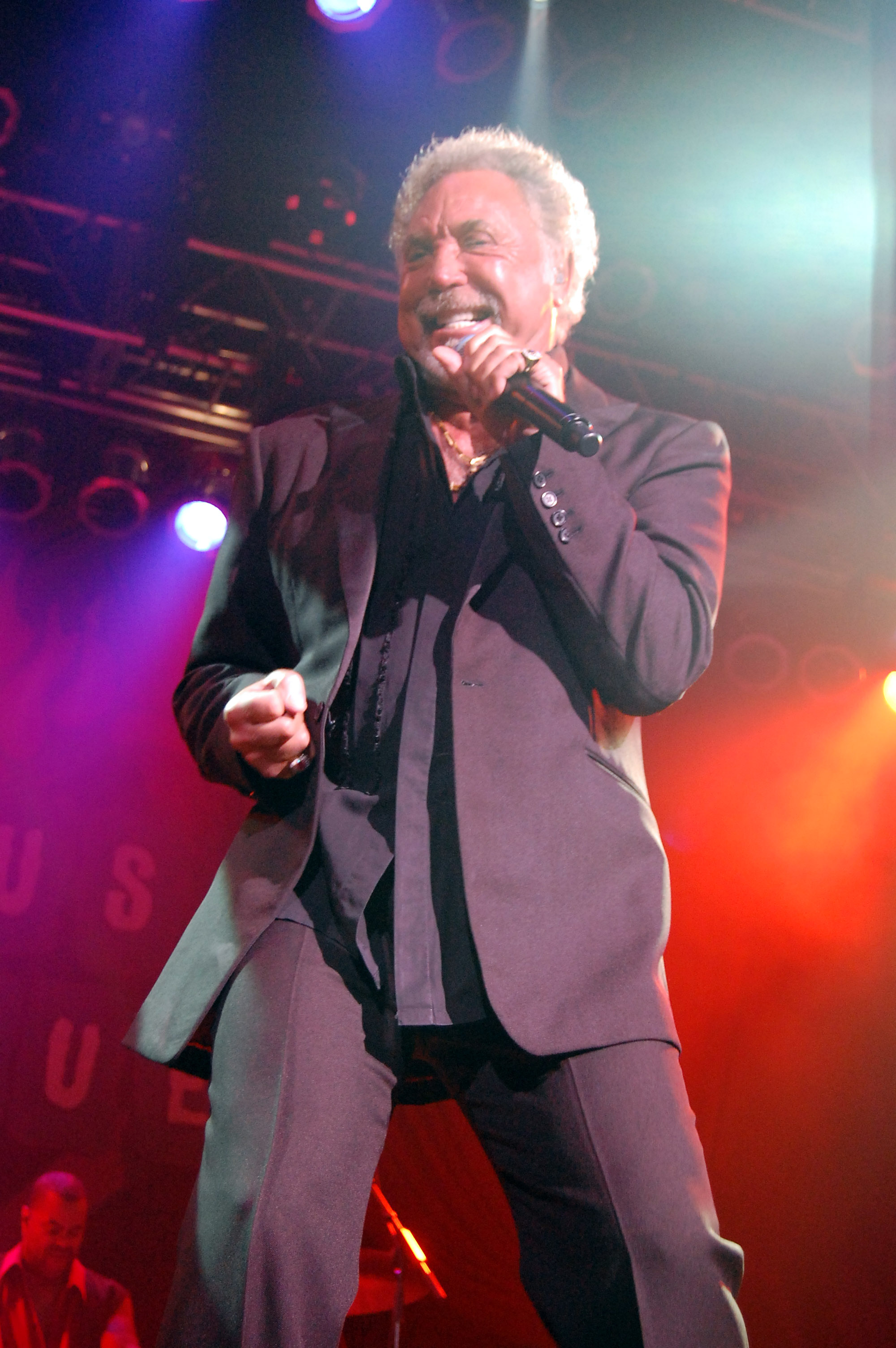
Stereophonics collaborated with fellow Welsh singer Tom Jones for the singer's 1999 album Reload on the song "Mama Told Me Not to Come".

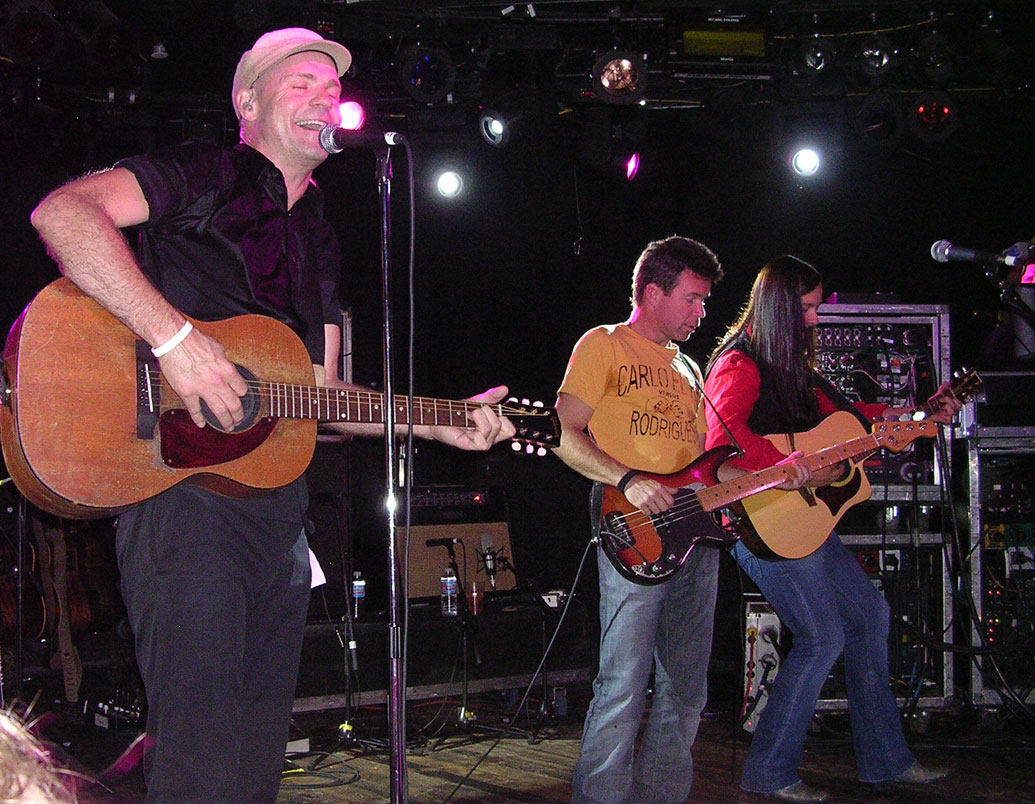
The Tragically Hip influenced Stereophonics and the band's previous name included an homage to them: Tragic Love Company. They covered "Fiddler's Green" and released it on "The Bartender and the Thief" single.

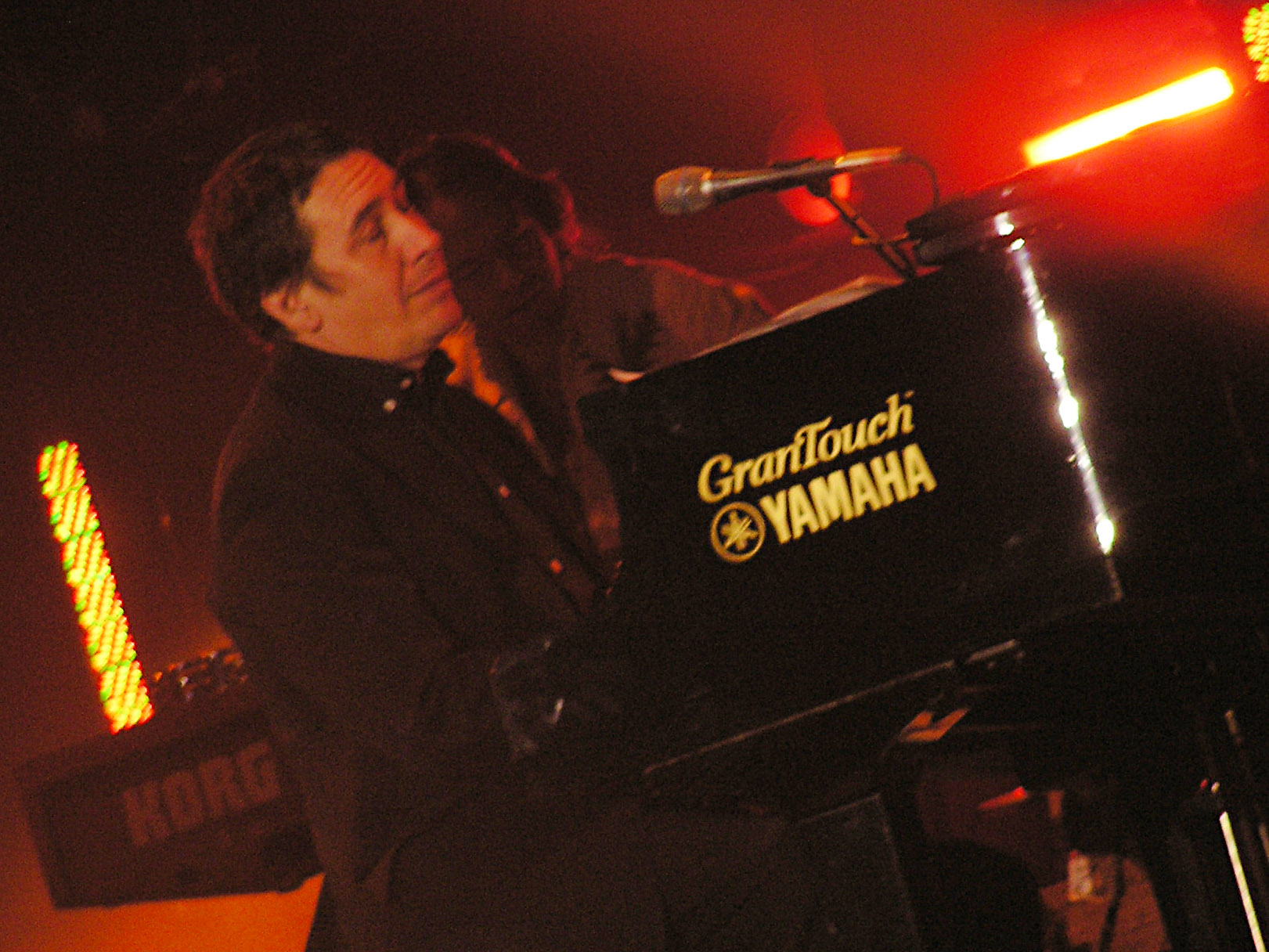
Jools Holland collaborated with the band for one of the b-sides on "Handbags and Gladrags" single, in turn they have appeared on his album Small World Big Band covering "Revolution" with Jools Holland's Rhythm and Blues Orchestra. The band have made multiple appearances on his show Later... with Jools Holland.

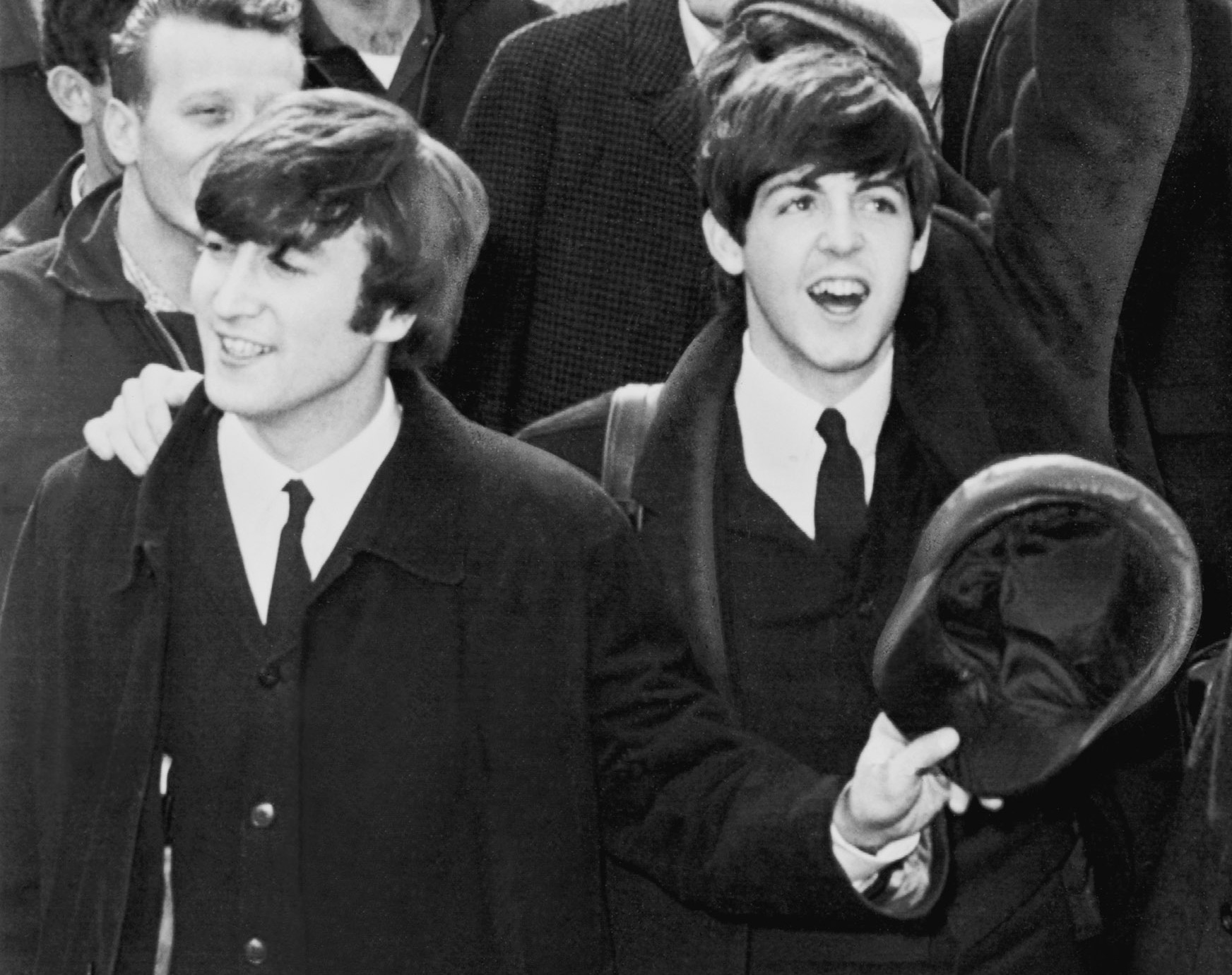
Stereophonics have covered four songs written by John Lennon and Paul McCartney plus "How?" written by Lennon.

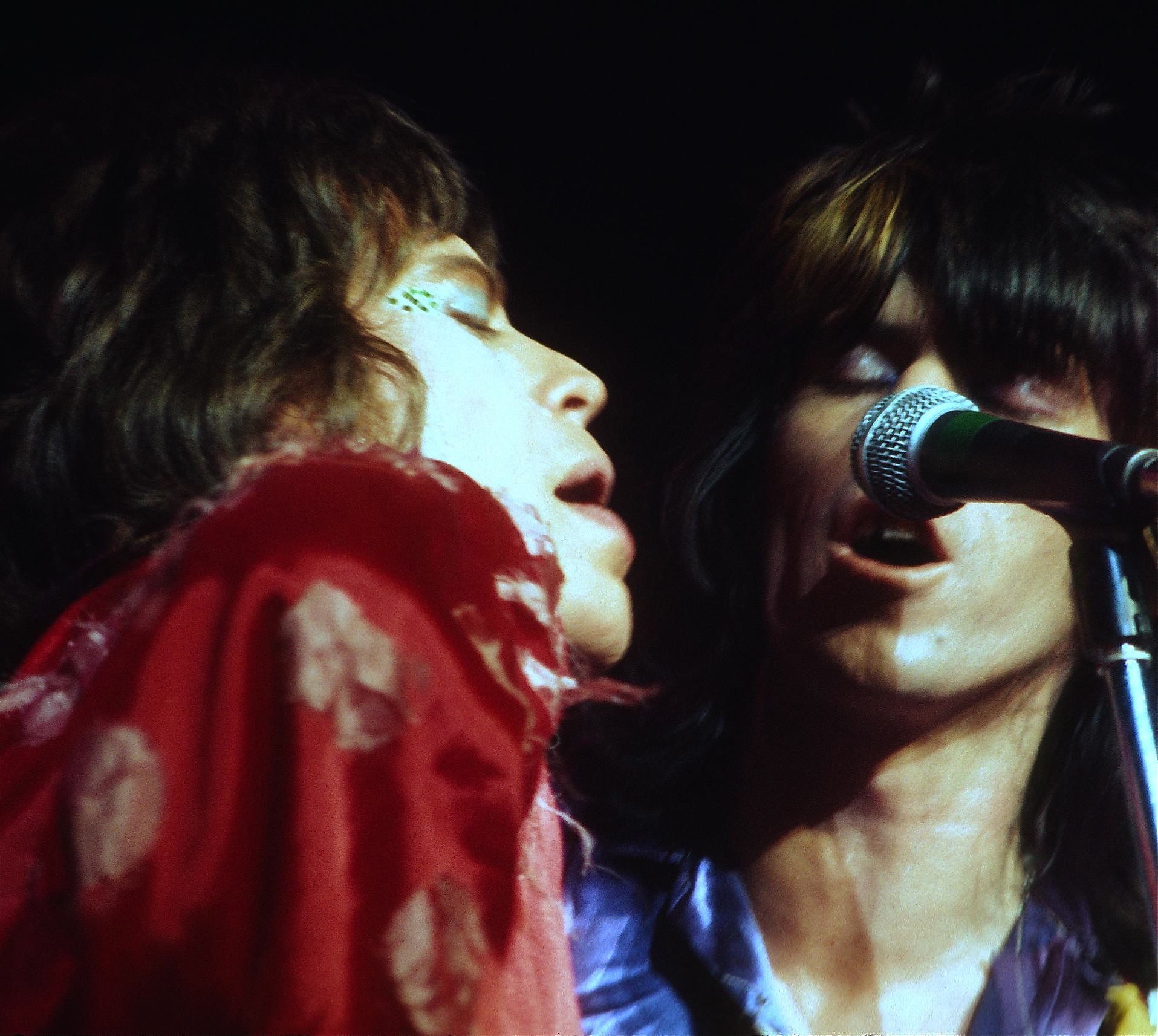
"Angie" and "Gimmie Shelter" were both written by Mick Jagger and Keith Richards from The Rolling Stones and covered by Stereophonics.

†	Indicates single release
#	Indicates B-side release
‡	Indicates non-Stereophonics release
§	Indicates written by non-Stereophonics member

Name of song, writer(s), producer(s), originating album or single, and year released.
Song	Writer(s) (Note: For Stereophonics songs: The "Writer(s)" column applies to personnel who wrote the music, Kelly Jones writes all the lyrics for the band.)	Producer(s)	Album/Single	Year	Ref.
"100mph"	Kelly Jones	Kelly Jones; Jim Lowe	Keep Calm and Carry On	2009	
"All in One Night" †	Kelly Jones	Kelly Jones; Jim Lowe	Scream Above the Sounds Other release(s): Scream Above the Sounds (Deluxe edition) (Unplugged)	2017	
"Ancient Rome"	Kelly Jones	Kelly Jones; Jim Lowe	Keep the Village Alive (Deluxe edition)	2015	
"Angie" #	Jagger/Richards §	Bird & Bush	"Hurry Up and Wait"	1999	
"An Audience With Mr Nice" #	Kelly Jones	Bird & Bush	"Mr. Writer"	2001	
"Bank Holiday Monday"	Kelly Jones	Kelly Jones; Jim Lowe	Pull the Pin Other release(s): "It Means Nothing" CD; "It Means Nothing" vinyl 1; "It Means Nothing" vinyl 2; Pull the Pin EP (Live from Wembley); Decade in the Sun: Best of Stereophonics (Deluxe edition)	2007	
"The Bartender and the Thief" †	Kelly Jones; Richard Jones; Stuart Cable	Bird & Bush	Performance and Cocktails Other release(s): "I Wouldn't Believe Your Radio" CD 1 (bar version); "Moviestar" maxi CD (live from Sheffield Arena); Live from Dakota; Decade in the Sun: Best of Stereophonics	1999	
"Been Caught Cheating"	Kelly Jones	Kelly Jones; Jim Lowe	Graffiti on the Train	2013	
"Beerbottle"	Kelly Jones	Jim Abbiss; Kelly Jones	Keep Calm and Carry On	2009	
"Before Anyone Know Our Name" †	Kelly Jones	Kelly Jones; Jim Lowe	Scream Above the Sounds	2017	
"Billy Davey's Daughter"	Kelly Jones; Richard Jones; Stuart Cable	Bird & Bush	Word Gets Around Other release(s): "Hurry Up and Wait" CD 2 (live from Morfa Stadium); "Lying in the Sun" (acoustic version); Decade in the Sun: Best of Stereophonics (Deluxe edition)	1997	
"Blame (You Never Give Me Your Money)"	Kelly Jones	Kelly Jones; Jim Lowe	Keep the Village Alive (Deluxe edition)	2015	
"Boy on a Bike"	Kelly Jones	Kelly Jones; Jim Lowe	Scream Above the Sounds	2017	
"Breaking Dawn"	Kelly Jones	Kelly Jones; Jim Abbiss	Scream Above the Sounds (Deluxe edition)	2017	
"Bright Red Star"	Kelly Jones	Kelly Jones; Jim Lowe	Pull the Pin	2007	
"Brother"	Kelly Jones	Kelly Jones; Jim Lowe	Language. Sex. Violence. Other? Other release(s): "Devil" maxi CD	2005	
"Bust This Town"	Kelly Jones	Kelly Jones; Jim Lowe	Kind	2019	
"Buy Myself a Small Plane" #	Kelly Jones; Richard Jones; Stuart Cable	Bird & Bush	"Local Boy in the Photograph"	1997	
"C'est la Vie" †	Kelly Jones	Kelly Jones; Jim Lowe	Keep the Village Alive	2015	
"Caravan Holiday"	Kelly Jones	Bird & Bush	Just Enough Education to Perform Other release(s): "Handbags and Gladrags" CD 2 (acoustic version)	2001	
"Carrot Cake and Wine" #	Kelly Jones; Richard Jones; Stuart Cable	Bird & Bush	"A Thousand Trees" Other release(s): Live from Dakota; Decade in the Sun: Best of Stereophonics (Deluxe edition)	1997	
"Catacomb"	Kelly Jones	Kelly Jones; Jim Lowe	Graffiti on the Train	2013	
"Caught by the Wind" †	Kelly Jones	Kelly Jones; Jim Lowe	Scream Above the Sounds Other release(s): Scream Above the Sounds (Deluxe edition) (Unplugged)	2017	
"Chances Are"	Kelly Jones	Kelly Jones; Jim Lowe	Scream Above the Sounds	2017	
"Change Changes Things" #	Kelly Jones	Kelly Jones	"Maybe Tomorrow"	2003	
"Chaos From The Top Down" †	Kelly Jones	Kelly Jones; Jim Lowe	Non-album single	2019	
"Check My Eyelids For Holes"	Kelly Jones; Richard Jones; Stuart Cable	Bird & Bush	Word Gets Around Other release(s): "Local Boy in the Photograph" CD 1 (re-release)	1997	
"Chris Chambers" #	Kelly Jones; Richard Jones; Stuart Cable	Bird & Bush	"Traffic"	1997	
"Climbing the Wall"	Kelly Jones	Kelly Jones	You Gotta Go There to Come Back Other release(s): "Moviestar" DVD (live); Decade in the Sun: Best of Stereophonics (Deluxe edition)	2003	
"Could You Be the One?" †	Kelly Jones	Jim Abbiss; Kelly Jones	Keep Calm and Carry On	2009	
"Crush"	Kelly Jones	Kelly Jones; Jim Lowe	Pull the Pin	2007	
"Cryin' in Your Beer"	Kelly Jones	Kelly Jones; Jim Lowe	Scream Above the Sounds	2017	
"Daisy Lane"	Kelly Jones	Kelly Jones; Jim Lowe	Pull the Pin	2007	
"Dakota" †	Kelly Jones	Kelly Jones; Jim Lowe	Language. Sex. Violence. Other? Other release(s): Live from London EP; "Devil" maxi CD; Live from Dakota; Decade in the Sun: Best of Stereophonics	2005	
"Dapper Dan" #	Kelly Jones	Kelly Jones; Jim Lowe	"Devil"	2005	
"Deadhead"	Kelly Jones	Kelly Jones; Jim Lowe	Language. Sex. Violence. Other? Other release(s): Live from Dakota	2005	
"Devil" †	Kelly Jones	Kelly Jones; Jim Lowe	Language. Sex. Violence. Other? Other release(s): Live from London EP; Live from Dakota; Decade in the Sun: Best of Stereophonics	2005	
"Don't Let Me Down" #	Lennon/McCartney §	Bird & Bush	"Mr. Writer"	2001	
"Don't Let the Devil Take Another Day"	Kelly Jones	George Drakoulias; Kelly Jones	Kind Other release(s): Kind (Deluxe edition) (Kelly and Jamie Demo)	2019	
"Doorman"	Kelly Jones	Kelly Jones; Jim Lowe	Language. Sex. Violence. Other? Other release(s): Live from London EP; Live from Dakota	2005	
"Drive a Thousand Miles"	Kelly Jones	Kelly Jones; Jim Lowe	Scream Above the Sounds (Deluxe edition)	2017	
"Drowning"	Kelly Jones	Kelly Jones; Jim Lowe	Pull the Pin	2007	
"Elevators"	Kelly Jones	Kelly Jones; Jim Lowe	Scream Above the Sounds	2017	
"Everyday I Think of Money"	Kelly Jones	Bird & Bush	Just Enough Education to Perform Other release(s): "Step on My Old Size Nines" CD 2 (acoustic version)	2001	
"Feel"	Kelly Jones	Kelly Jones; Jim Lowe	Language. Sex. Violence. Other?	2005	
"Fiddlers Green" #	The Tragically Hip §	Bird & Bush	"The Bartender and the Thief"	1998	
"Fight or Flight"	Kelly Jones	Kelly Jones; Jim Lowe	Keep the Village Alive	2015	
"The First Time Ever I Saw Your Face" # with Jools Holland	Ewan MacColl §	Bird & Bush	"Handbags and Gladrags" Other release(s): Decade in the Sun: Best of Stereophonics (Deluxe edition)	2001	
"Fly like an Eagle"	Kelly Jones	George Drakoulias; Kelly Jones	Kind Other release(s): Kind (Deluxe edition) (Kelly and Jamie Demo)	2019	
"Forever" #	Kelly Jones	Kelly Jones; Jim Lowe	"You're My Star"	2008	
"Geronimo"	Kelly Jones	Kelly Jones; Jim Lowe	Scream Above the Sounds	2017	
"Getaway"	Kelly Jones	Kelly Jones	You Gotta Go There to Come Back Other release(s): Decade in the Sun: Best of Stereophonics (Deluxe edition)	2003	
"Gimme Shelter" #	Jagger/Richards §	Kelly Jones; Jim Lowe	"My Friends" Other release(s): Pass the Buck EP (Live from Tower Bridge Rehearsal)	2007	
"Girl"	Kelly Jones	Kelly Jones; Jim Lowe	Language. Sex. Violence. Other?	2005	
"Goldfish Bowl"	Kelly Jones; Richard Jones; Stuart Cable	Bird & Bush	Word Gets Around	1997	
"Graffiti on the Train" †	Kelly Jones	Kelly Jones; Jim Lowe	Graffiti on the Train Other release(s): Graffiti on the Train (Deluxe edition) (stripped); Graffiti on the Train (iTunes edition) (stripped); Live from the Royal Albert Hall EP	2013	
"Half the Lies You Tell Ain't True"	Kelly Jones; Richard Jones; Stuart Cable	Bird & Bush	Performance and Cocktails	1999	
"Hammerhead" #	Kelly Jones	Kelly Jones; Jim Lowe	"Rewind"	2005	
"Handbags and Gladrags" †	Mike d'Abo §	Bird & Bush	Just Enough Education to Perform (Re-release) Other release(s): "Handbags and Gladrags" CD 2 (acoustic version); Decade in the Sun: Best of Stereophonics	2002	
"Hangman" (demo) #	Kelly Jones	Kelly Jones; Jim Lowe	"It Means Nothing"	2007	
"Have a Nice Day" †	Kelly Jones	Bird & Bush	Just Enough Education to Perform Other release(s): "Have a Nice Day" CD 2 (acoustic version); Decade in the Sun: Best of Stereophonics	2001	
"Have Wheels Will Travel" #	Kelly Jones	Kelly Jones	"Maybe Tomorrow"	2003	
"Heart of Gold" #	Neil Young §	Bird & Bush	"Have a Nice Day"	2001	
"Help Me (She's Out of Her Mind)"	Kelly Jones	Kelly Jones	You Gotta Go There to Come Back Other release(s): "Moviestar" maxi CD (live from Glasgow SECC)	2003	
"Helter Skelter" #	Lennon/McCartney §	Kelly Jones; Jim Lowe	"It Means Nothing"	2007	
"High as the Ceiling"	Kelly Jones	Kelly Jones	You Gotta Go There to Come Back Other release(s): "Madame Helga" CD 1	2003	
"Home to Me" #	Kelly Jones; Richard Jones; Stuart Cable	Bird & Bush	"A Thousand Trees"	1997	
"How?" #	John Lennon §	Bird & Bush	"Handbags and Gladrags"	2001	
"Hungover for You"	Kelly Jones	George Drakoulias; Kelly Jones	Kind	2019	
"Hurry Up and Wait" †	Kelly Jones; Richard Jones; Stuart Cable	Bird & Bush	Performance and Cocktails Other release(s): "Hurry Up and Wait" CD 2 (live from Morfa Stadium); "Mr. Writer" CD 2 (acoustic version); Live from Dakota; Decade in the Sun: Best of Stereophonics (Deluxe edition)	1999	
"I Could Lose Ya"	Kelly Jones; Richard Jones; Javier Weyler	Kelly Jones; Jim Lowe	Pull the Pin	2007	
"I Got Your Number"	Kelly Jones	Jim Abbiss; Kelly Jones	Keep Calm and Carry On	2009	
"I Just Wanted the Goods"	Kelly Jones	George Drakoulias; Kelly Jones	Kind Other release(s): Kind (Deluxe edition) (Kelly and Jamie Demo)	2019	
"I Miss You Now"	Kelly Jones	Kelly Jones	You Gotta Go There to Come Back Other release(s): "Since I Told You It's Over" CD 2 (demo)	2003	
"I Stopped to Fill My Car Up"	Kelly Jones; Richard Jones; Stuart Cable	Bird & Bush	Performance and Cocktails Other release(s): "Hurry Up and Wait" CD 2 (live from Morfa Stadium); "Have a Nice Day" CD 2 (acoustic version); Decade in the Sun: Best of Stereophonics (Deluxe edition)	1999	
"I Wanna Be Your Dog" #	Dave Alexander; Ron Asheton; Scott Asheton; Iggy Pop §	Kelly Jones; Jim Lowe	"Superman"	2005	
"I Wanna Get Lost With You" †	Kelly Jones	Kelly Jones; Jim Lowe	Keep the Village Alive Other release(s): Keep the Village Alive (Deluxe edition) (acoustic 2015); Live from the Royal Albert Hall EP	2015	
"I Wouldn't Believe Your Radio" †	Kelly Jones; Richard Jones; Stuart Cable	Bird & Bush	Performance and Cocktails Other release(s): "I Wouldn't Believe Your Radio" CD 2 (live from Morfa Stadium); "Hurry Up and Wait" CD 1; Decade in the Sun: Best of Stereophonics	1999	
"I'm Alright (You Gotta Go There to Come Back)"	Kelly Jones	Kelly Jones	You Gotta Go There to Come Back Other release(s): Live from Dakota; Decade in the Sun: Best of Stereophonics (Deluxe edition)	2003	
"I'm Only Sleeping" #	Lennon/McCartney §	Bird & Bush	"Step on My Old Size Nines"	2001	
"In a Moment" †	Kelly Jones	Kelly Jones; Jim Lowe	Graffiti on the Train Other release(s): Graffiti on the Train (Deluxe edition) (alternative version); Graffiti on the Train (Deluxe edition) (Toydrum remix); Graffiti on the Train (iTunes edition) (alternative version) (in the studio)	2013	
"In My Day" #	Kelly Jones; Richard Jones; Stuart Cable	Bird & Bush	"Pick a Part That's New"	1999	
"Indian Summer" †	Kelly Jones	Kelly Jones; Jim Lowe	Graffiti on the Train Other release(s): Graffiti on the Train (Deluxe edition) (up close); Graffiti on the Train (iTunes edition) (in the studio); Live from the Royal Albert Hall EP	2013	
"Innocent" †	Kelly Jones	Jim Abbiss; Kelly Jones	Keep Calm and Carry On	2009	
"Into the World"	Kelly Jones	Kelly Jones; Jim Lowe	Keep the Village Alive	2015	
"Is Yesterday, Tomorrow, Today?"	Kelly Jones; Richard Jones; Stuart Cable	Bird & Bush	Performance and Cocktails	1999	
"It Means Nothing" †	Kelly Jones	Kelly Jones; Jim Lowe	Pull the Pin Other release(s): Pull the Pin EP (Live from Wembley); Decade in the Sun: Best of Stereophonics	2007	
"Jayne" (Note: Kelly Jones wrote and released "Jayne" originally on his début album Only the Names Have Been Changed. During the Language. Sex. Violence. Other? Tour, Stereophonics performed the song together and this was recorded and released on Live from Dakota.)	Kelly Jones	Kelly Jones	Live from Dakota	2006	
"Jealousy"	Kelly Jones	Kelly Jones	You Gotta Go There to Come Back Other release(s): "Since I Told You It's Over" CD 2 (demo)	2003	
"Just Looking" †	Kelly Jones; Richard Jones; Stuart Cable	Bird & Bush	Performance and Cocktails Other release(s): "Step on My Old Size Nines" CD 2 (acoustic version); Live from Dakota; Decade in the Sun: Best of Stereophonics	1999	
"Katman" #	Kelly Jones	Kelly Jones; Jim Lowe	"My Friends"	2007	
"Lady Luck"	Kelly Jones	Kelly Jones; Jim Lowe	Pull the Pin	2007	
"Last of the Big Time Drinkers"	Kelly Jones; Richard Jones; Stuart Cable	Bird & Bush	Word Gets Around Other release(s): "More Life in a Tramps Vest" CD 2 (live from Oxford Zodiac)	1997	
"The Last Resort" #	Glenn Frey; Don Henley §	Bird & Bush	"Local Boy in the Photograph"	1997	
"Let Me In"	Kelly Jones	Kelly Jones; Jim Lowe	Keep the Village Alive (Deluxe edition)	2015	
"Live 'n' Love"	Kelly Jones	Kelly Jones; Jim Lowe	Keep Calm and Carry On	2009	
"Local Boy in the Photograph" †	Kelly Jones; Richard Jones; Stuart Cable	Bird & Bush	Word Gets Around Other release(s): "Traffic" CD 2 (live from Belfort Festival); "Moviestar" mini CD (live from Glasgow SECC); Live from Dakota; Decade in the Sun: Best of Stereophonics	1997	
"Lolita"	Kelly Jones	Kelly Jones; Jim Lowe	Language. Sex. Violence. Other?	2005	
"Long Way Down" (Note: "Long Way Down" written for the documentary television series of the same name as its theme song.)	Kelly Jones	Kelly Jones; Jim Lowe	Long Way Down: Music from an Epic Motorcycle Adventure ‡	2007	
"Long Way Round" (Note: "Long Way Round" written for the documentary television series of the same name as its theme song. This wasn't included in the show's soundtrack album.) #	Kelly Jones	Kelly Jones; Jim Lowe	"Dakota"	2005	
"Looks like Chaplin" †	Kelly Jones; Richard Jones; Stuart Cable	Bird & Bush	Word Gets Around Other release(s): "Local Boy in the Photograph" (1st release); "More Life in a Tramps Vest" CD 2 (live from Oxford Zodiac); "A Thousand Trees" CD 2	1996	
"Lying in the Sun" (Note: "Lying in the Sun" single release was only available to the band's fan club in 2002 as part of the fan-only box set Just Enough Education to Perform - An Acoustic Preview.) †	Kelly Jones	Bird & Bush	Just Enough Education to Perform Other release(s): "Lying in the Sun" (acoustic version)	2001	
"Madame Helga" †	Kelly Jones	Kelly Jones	You Gotta Go There to Come Back Other release(s): "Maybe Tomorrow" CD 2 (demo); "Since I Told You It's Over" CD 1 (live acoustic version); Live from Dakota; Decade in the Sun: Best of Stereophonics (Deluxe edition)	2003	
"Make Friends with the Morning"	Kelly Jones	George Drakoulias; Kelly Jones	Kind Other release(s): Kind (Deluxe edition) (Kelly and Jamie Demo)	2019	
"Mama Told Me Not To Come" † with Tom Jones	Randy Newman §	Bird & Bush	Decade in the Sun: Best of Stereophonics (Deluxe edition)	2008	
"Maritim Belle Vue In Kiel" #	Kelly Jones	Bird & Bush	"Mr. Writer"	2001	
"Maybe"	Kelly Jones	Bird & Bush	Just Enough Education to Perform	2001	
"Maybe Tomorrow" †	Kelly Jones	Kelly Jones	You Gotta Go There to Come Back Other release(s): "Rewind" maxi CD; Live from Dakota; Decade in the Sun: Best of Stereophonics	2003	
"A Minute Longer"	Kelly Jones; Richard Jones; Stuart Cable	Bird & Bush	Performance and Cocktails	1999	
"More Life in a Tramps Vest" (Note: "More Life in a Tramps Vest" was included on the double A-side single "Looks like Chaplin" before becoming its own single.) †	Kelly Jones; Richard Jones; Stuart Cable	Bird & Bush	Word Gets Around Other release(s): "More Life in a Tramps Vest" CD 2 (live from Oxford Zodiac); "Traffic" CD 2 (live from Belfort Festival); Decade in the Sun: Best of Stereophonics	1997	
"Moviestar" †	Kelly Jones	Kelly Jones; Jim Lowe	You Gotta Go There to Come Back (Re-release) Other release(s): Decade in the Sun: Best of Stereophonics (Deluxe edition)	2004	
"Mr and Mrs Smith" †	Kelly Jones	Kelly Jones; Jim Lowe	Keep the Village Alive	2015	
"Mr. Writer" †	Marshall Bird; Kelly Jones	Bird & Bush	Just Enough Education to Perform Other release(s): "Mr. Writer" CD 2 (acoustic version); "Vegas Two Times" CD 1 (live); Live from Dakota; Decade in the Sun: Best of Stereophonics	2001	
"My Friends" †	Kelly Jones	Kelly Jones; Jim Lowe	Pull the Pin Other release(s): Pull the Pin EP (Live from Wembley); Pass the Buck EP (Live); Decade in the Sun: Best of Stereophonics (Deluxe edition)	2007	
"My Hero"	Kelly Jones	Kelly Jones; Jim Lowe	Keep the Village Alive	2015	
"My Own Worst Enemy"	Kelly Jones; Adam Zindani	Kelly Jones; Jim Lowe	Decade in the Sun: Best of Stereophonics	2008	
"Never Going Down"	Kelly Jones	Kelly Jones; Jim Lowe	Scream Above the Sounds (Deluxe edition)	2017	
"Nice to be Out"	Kelly Jones	Bird & Bush	Just Enough Education to Perform Other release(s): "Handbags and Gladrags" CD 2 (acoustic version)	2001	
"Nitedrive" #	Kelly Jones	Kelly Jones; Jim Lowe	"My Friends" Other release(s): Pass the Buck EP	2007	
"No-one's Perfect"	Kelly Jones	Kelly Jones; Jim Lowe	Graffiti on the Train	2013	
"Not Up to You"	Kelly Jones; Richard Jones; Stuart Cable	Bird & Bush	Word Gets Around Other release(s): "Local Boy in the Photograph" CD 2 (re-release) (live XFM Radio); Decade in the Sun: Best of Stereophonics (Deluxe edition)	1997	
"Nothing Precious At All"	Kelly Jones	Kelly Jones	You Gotta Go There to Come Back Other release(s): "Since I Told You It's Over" CD 1 (acoustic version)	2003	
"The Old Laughing Lady" #	Ry Cooder; Jack Nitzsche; Neil Young §	Bird & Bush	"I Wouldn't Believe Your Radio"	1999	
"Ooh La La" #	Kelly Jones	Kelly Jones; Jim Lowe	"Rewind"	2005	
"Overland"	Kelly Jones	Kelly Jones; Jim Lowe	Graffiti on the Train (Deluxe edition)	2013	
"Outside" #	Kelly Jones	Kelly Jones; Jim Lowe	"Superman"	2005	
"Pass the Buck"	Kelly Jones	Kelly Jones; Jim Lowe	Pull the Pin Other release(s): Pull the Pin EP (Live from Wembley); Pass the Buck EP	2007	
"Pedalpusher"	Kelly Jones	Kelly Jones; Jim Lowe	Language. Sex. Violence. Other? Other release(s): Live from London EP; Live from Dakota	2005	
"Piano For a Stripper" (demo) #	Kelly Jones	Bird & Bush	"Have a Nice Day"	2001	
"Pick a Part That's New" †	Kelly Jones; Richard Jones; Stuart Cable	Bird & Bush	Performance and Cocktails Other release(s): "I Wouldn't Believe Your Radio" CD 2 (live from Morfa Stadium); Decade in the Sun: Best of Stereophonics	1999	
"Plastic California"	Kelly Jones; Richard Jones; Stuart Cable	Bird & Bush	Performance and Cocktails	1999	
"Poppy Day" #	Kelly Jones; Richard Jones; Stuart Cable	Bird & Bush	"More Life in a Tramps Vest"	1997	
"Positively 4th Street" #	Bob Dylan §	Bird & Bush	"More Life in a Tramps Vest"	1997	
"Postmen Do Not Great Movie Heroes Make" #	Kelly Jones; Richard Jones; Stuart Cable	Bird & Bush	"Just Looking"	1999	
"Rainbows and Pots of Gold"	Kelly Jones	Kelly Jones	You Gotta Go There to Come Back	2003	
"Raymond's Shop" #	Kelly Jones; Richard Jones; Stuart Cable	Bird & Bush	"More Life in a Tramps Vest" Other release(s): Decade in the Sun: Best of Stereophonics (Deluxe edition)	1997	
"Restless Mind"	Kelly Jones	George Drakoulias; Kelly Jones	Kind Other release(s): Kind (Deluxe edition) (Kelly and Jamie Demo)	2019	
"Revolution" with Jools Holland's Rhythm and Blues Orchestra	Lennon/McCartney §	Ron Burrow; Jools Holland	Small World Big Band ‡	2001	
"Rewind" †	Kelly Jones	Kelly Jones; Jim Lowe	Language. Sex. Violence. Other? Other release(s): Decade in the Sun: Best of Stereophonics (Deluxe edition)	2005	
"Roll the Dice"	Kelly Jones	Kelly Jones; Jim Lowe	Graffiti on the Train	2013	
"Roll Up and Shine"	Kelly Jones; Richard Jones; Stuart Cable	Bird & Bush	Performance and Cocktails Other release(s): "Vegas Two Times" CD 2 (live)	1999	
"Rooftop"	Kelly Jones	Bird & Bush	Just Enough Education to Perform	2001	
"Royal Flush" (demo) (Note: "Royal Flush" would later become "Deadhead".) #	Kelly Jones	Kelly Jones	"Madame Helga"	2003	
"Sail Away" (Note: "Sail Away" became "You Stole My Money Honey".) #	Kelly Jones	Kelly Jones	"Maybe Tomorrow"	2003	
"Same Size Feet"	Kelly Jones; Richard Jones; Stuart Cable	Bird & Bush	Word Gets Around Other release(s): Decade in the Sun: Best of Stereophonics (Deluxe edition)	1997	
"Seen That Look Before"	Kelly Jones	Kelly Jones; Jim Lowe	Graffiti on the Train (Japanese edition)	2013	
"She Takes Her Clothes Off"	Kelly Jones; Richard Jones; Stuart Cable	Bird & Bush	Performance and Cocktails Other release(s): Decade in the Sun: Best of Stereophonics (Deluxe edition)	1999	
"She's Alright"	Kelly Jones	Jim Abbiss; Kelly Jones	Keep Calm and Carry On	2009	
"Shoeshine Boy" #	Kelly Jones	Bird & Bush	"Step on My Old Size Nines"	2001	
"Show Me How"	Kelly Jones	Jim Abbiss; Kelly Jones	Keep Calm and Carry On	2009	
"Since I Told You It's Over" †	Kelly Jones	Kelly Jones	You Gotta Go There to Come Back Other release(s): Decade in the Sun: Best of Stereophonics (Deluxe edition)	2003	
"Sing Little Sister"	Kelly Jones	Kelly Jones; Jim Lowe	Keep the Village Alive	2015	
"Soldiers Make Good Targets"	Kelly Jones	Kelly Jones; Jim Lowe	Pull the Pin	2007	
"Something in the Way" #	Kurt Cobain §	Bird & Bush	"Pick a Part That's New"	1999	
"Song for the Summer" †	Kelly Jones	Kelly Jones; Jim Lowe	Keep the Village Alive Other release(s): Live from the Royal Albert Hall EP	2015	
"Soul" (demo) #	Kelly Jones	Kelly Jones; Jim Lowe	"Dakota"	2005	
"Step on My Old Size Nines" †	Kelly Jones	Bird & Bush	Just Enough Education to Perform Other release(s): "Step on My Old Size Nines" CD 2 (acoustic version); Decade in the Sun: Best of Stereophonics	2001	
"Stitches"	Kelly Jones	George Drakoulias; Kelly Jones	Kind Other release(s): Kind (Deluxe edition) (Kelly and Jamie Demo)	2019	
"Stone"	Kelly Jones	Kelly Jones; Jim Lowe	Pull the Pin Other release(s): Decade in the Sun: Best of Stereophonics (Deluxe edition)	2007	
"Street of Orange Light"	Kelly Jones	George Drakoulias; Kelly Jones	Kind	2019	
"Stuck in a Rut"	Kelly Jones	Jim Abbiss; Kelly Jones	Keep Calm and Carry On	2009	
"Summertime" #	George Gershwin; Ira Gershwin; Dorothy Heyward; DuBose Heyward §	Bird & Bush	"A Thousand Trees"	1997	
"Sunny"	Kelly Jones	Kelly Jones; Jim Lowe	Keep the Village Alive	2015	
"Sunny Afternoon" #	Ray Davies §	Bird & Bush	"Just Looking"	1999	
"Superman" †	Kelly Jones	Kelly Jones; Jim Lowe	Language. Sex. Violence. Other? Other release(s): Live from London EP; "Rewind" 7" vinyl; Live from Dakota; Decade in the Sun: Best of Stereophonics	2005	
"Surprise" #	Kelly Jones	Bird & Bush	"Have a Nice Day"	2001	
"Take Me"	Kelly Jones	Kelly Jones; Jim Lowe	Graffiti on the Train	2013	
"Taken a Tumble" †	Kelly Jones; Adam Zindani	Kelly Jones; Jim Lowe	Scream Above the Sounds	2017	
"This Life Ain't Easy (But It's the One That We All Got)"	Kelly Jones	George Drakoulias; Kelly Jones	Kind	2019	
"A Thousand Trees" †	Kelly Jones; Richard Jones; Stuart Cable	Bird & Bush	Word Gets Around Other release(s): "A Thousand Trees" CD 1 (live from Oxford Zodiac); "Traffic" CD 2 (live from Belfort Festival); Live from Dakota; Decade in the Sun: Best of Stereophonics	1997	
"Tie Me Up Tie Me Down" #	Kelly Jones; Richard Jones; Stuart Cable	Bird & Bush	"Traffic"	1997	
"Too Many Sandwiches"	Kelly Jones; Richard Jones; Stuart Cable	Bird & Bush	Word Gets Around Other release(s): "Local Boy in the Photograph" (1st release); "More Life in a Tramps Vest" CD 2 (live from Oxford Zodiac); Live from Dakota	1997	
"Traffic" †	Kelly Jones; Richard Jones; Stuart Cable	Bird & Bush	Word Gets Around Other release(s): "Traffic" CD 2 (live from Belfort Festival); "Lying in the Sun" (acoustic version); Live from Dakota; Decade in the Sun: Best of Stereophonics	1997	
"Trouble"	Kelly Jones	Jim Abbiss; Kelly Jones	Keep Calm and Carry On	2009	
"T-Shirt Suntan"	Kelly Jones; Richard Jones; Stuart Cable	Bird & Bush	Performance and Cocktails Other release(s): "I Wouldn't Believe Your Radio" CD 2 (live from Morfa Stadium)	1999	
"Uppercut"	Kelly Jones	Kelly Jones	Keep Calm and Carry On	2009	
"Vegas Two Times" †	Kelly Jones	Bird & Bush	Just Enough Education to Perform Other release(s): "Vegas Two Times" CD 2 (radio edit); "Vegas Two Times" CD 2 (live); Live from Dakota; Decade in the Sun: Best of Stereophonics	2001	
"Violins and Tambourines"	Kelly Jones; Jim Lowe	Kelly Jones; Jim Lowe	Graffiti on the Train	2013	
"Watch Them Fly Sundays"	Kelly Jones	Bird & Bush	Just Enough Education to Perform Other release(s): "Vegas Two Times" CD 1 (live)	2001	
"We Share the Same Sun" †	Kelly Jones	Kelly Jones; Jim Lowe	Graffiti on the Train Other release(s): Graffiti on the Train (Deluxe edition) (up close); Graffiti on the Train (iTunes edition) (in the studio)	2013	
"What's All the Fuss About?" †	Kelly Jones	Kelly Jones; Jim Lowe	Scream Above the Sounds	2017	
"White Lies" †	Kelly Jones	Kelly Jones; Jim Lowe	Keep the Village Alive	2015	
"Who'll Stop the Rain" #	John Fogerty §	Bird & Bush	"Local Boy in the Photograph" (re-release)	1998	
"Wonder"	Kelly Jones	Jim Abbiss; Kelly Jones	Keep Calm and Carry On	2009	
"Would You Believe?" †	Kelly Jones	Kelly Jones; Jim Lowe	Scream Above the Sounds	2017	
"You Are My Energy"	Kelly Jones	Kelly Jones; Jim Lowe	Keep the Village Alive (Deluxe edition)	2015	
"You Sexy Thing"	Errol Brown; Tony Wilson §	BBC Worldwide	Radio 1 Established 1967 ‡	2007	
"You Stole My Money Honey"	Kelly Jones	Kelly Jones	You Gotta Go There to Come Back	2003	
"You're My Star" †	Kelly Jones	Kelly Jones; Jim Lowe	Decade in the Sun: Best of Stereophonics Other release(s): Keep the Village Alive (Deluxe edition) (acoustic 2015)	2008	
"Zoe"	Kelly Jones	Kelly Jones; Jim Lowe	Graffiti on the Train (iTunes deluxe edition)	2013	

== See also ==
- Stereophonics discography
