= Rewind (video) =

2007 DVD by Welsh rock trio Stereophonics

- Directed by: Danny O'Connor
- Produced by: Stereophonics
- Starring: Stereophonics; Stuart Cable; Ronnie Wood; Paul Weller; Noel Gallagher; Bono; Jimmy Page; Jools Holland; Roger Daltrey; The Black Crowes; Tom Jones
- Music by: Stereophonics
- Production company: V2 Records
- Distributed by: Liberation Entertainment
- Release date: 2 April 2007
- Running time: 240 minutes
- Country: United Kingdom
- Language: English

Rewind is the second rockumentary by Welsh rock band Stereophonics. Released in 2007, it is the band's sixth DVD release. It contains over three hours of live and documentary footage spanning their entire career; from pre-Stereophonics years to their signing to V2 Records in 1996 to 2006. A booklet was also included with the DVD, featuring several previously unseen photographs of the band, from Kelly Jones' own personal photo album.

== Release ==
=== Rewind - Disc one ===
Documentary film lasting 100 mins also including extended scenes, a complete set of theatrical trailers for Rewind and a 60-second preview of Stereophonics' then-unreleased album, Pull the Pin.

=== Live - Disc two ===
Live performances from 1997 to 2006, including a never-before-seen acoustic concert from 2001.

==== Track listing ====
No.	Title	Segment	Length
1.	"Too Many Sandwiches"	"Live n Direct" in Australia 1997	5:10
2.	"Goldfish Bowl"	"Live n Direct" in Australia 1997	3:09
3.	"Check My Eyelids For Holes"	"Live n Direct" in Australia 1997	2:42
4.	"Local Boy in the Photograph"	Cardiff Castle 12 June 1998	3:17
5.	"The Bartender and the Thief"	Cardiff Castle 12 June 1998	3:19
6.	"Just Looking"	Morfa Stadium 31 July 1999	4:26
7.	"I Stopped to Fill My Car Up"	Morfa Stadium 31 July 1999	7:41
8.	"Roll Up and Shine"	Morfa Stadium 31 July 1999	3:59
9.	"J.E.E.P. An acoustic preview"
10.	"Vegas Two Times"	Millennium Stadium 21 July 2001	4:05
11.	"Mr. Writer"	Millennium Stadium 21 July 2001	6:32
12.	"Watch Them Sundays Fly"	Millennium Stadium 21 July 2001	4:58
13.	"Just Looking"	Tsunami benefit concert 21 January 2005	4:40
14.	"Jealousy"	Isle of Wight 11 June 2004	4:19
15.	"Moviestar"	Isle of Wight 11 June 2004	4:23
16.	"Maybe Tomorrow"	Isle of Wight 11 June 2004	4:32
17.	"Devil"	Language. Sex. Violence. Other? Tour 2005	4:25
18.	"Pedalpusher"	Language. Sex. Violence. Other? Tour 2005	3:17
19.	"Jayne"	Language. Sex. Violence. Other? Tour 2005	3:31
20.	"A Thousand Trees"	Language. Sex. Violence. Other? Tour 2005	3:25
21.	"The Bartender and the Thief"	Language. Sex. Violence. Other? Tour 2005	3:54
22.	"Hurry Up and Wait"	Language. Sex. Violence. Other? Tour 2005	4:52
23.	"Vegas Two Times"	Language. Sex. Violence. Other? Tour 2005	4:06
24.	"Carrot Cake and Wine"	Language. Sex. Violence. Other? Tour 2005	4:40
25.	"Traffic"	Language. Sex. Violence. Other? Tour 2005	5:05
26.	"Too Many Sandwiches"	Language. Sex. Violence. Other? Tour 2005	6:14
