= Decade in the Sun: Best of Stereophonics =

2008 compilation album by Stereophonics

Greatest hits album by Stereophonics
- Released: 10 November 2008
- Recorded: Late 1992–Early 2008
- Genre: Rock
- Label: V2
- Producers: Bird & Bush; Kelly Jones; Jim Lowe

Stereophonics chronology
Pull the Pin (2007)	Decade in the Sun: Best of Stereophonics (2008)	Keep Calm and Carry On (2009)

Alternative covers
- Deluxe edition cover

Singles from Decade in the Sun: The Best of Stereophonics
- 1. "You're My Star" Released: 27 October 2008

Decade in the Sun: Best of Stereophonics is a compilation album of greatest hits by Stereophonics. It features tracks from all six of the band's previous albums, beginning from the 1997 debut release, Word Gets Around, all the way through to 2007's Pull the Pin, plus two new songs, "You're My Star" and "My Own Worst Enemy". "You're My Star" was also released as a single.

The two-disc album features seven songs from Word Gets Around (1997), four from Performance and Cocktails (1999), five from Just Enough Education to Perform (2001), six from You Gotta Go There to Come Back (2003), four from Language. Sex. Violence. Other? (2005), four from Pull the Pin, one from the Tom Jones album Reload (1999), two B-sides, two non-album singles and two new songs. The one-disc album features five songs from Just Enough Education to Perform, four from Performance and Cocktails, four from Word Gets Around, three from Language. Sex. Violence. Other?, one from You Gotta Go There to Come Back, one from Pull the Pin and two new songs.

== Critical response ==
Professional ratings
Review scores
Source	Rating
AllMusic	3.5/5 stars
BBC	(positive)
Digital Spy	3/5 stars
laut.de	3/5 stars
PopMatters	5/10

Decade in the Sun received generally favourable reviews. Writing for the BBC, Sophie Bruce wrote a positive review. She labelled the album as a "fantastic selection sure to thrill Stereophonics superfans and new recruits alike" but criticised the band's choice of excluding "Madame Helga" and "Moviestar", two of their greatest hits in the UK. At Contactmusic.com, Alex Lai praised the compilation, particularly disc two's track selection for not "just throw[ing] in the singles that didn't make the regular release." Lai summarised that the album "act[s] as a good metaphor for Stereophonics." Stephen Thomas Erlewine from AllMusic found the band's evolution "effective" and "entertaining". In the negative however, he called the album "too comprehensive to be entertaining" and described the tracks as dragging "its heels over 20 tracks that all sound huge and hookless." Erlewine concluded the album shows listeners "why Stereophonics never translated across the Atlantic."

== Chart performance ==
The album debuted at number 2 with sales of 67,073 in the UK. The album is available in a 20-track edition, 40-track 2-CD Deluxe edition and DVD edition containing all the band's music videos, best live performances and some extra footage. With sales of 528,000 it was the 13th biggest selling album of 2008 in the UK. As of 16 March 2013, it had sold 1,044,219 copies in the United Kingdom. To date the album has spent 182 weeks in the top 100 UK Albums Chart.

== Track listing ==
All lyrics are written by Kelly Jones (except "Handbags and Gladrags", written by Mike d'Abo).

Disc one
No.	Title	Music	Album	Length
1.	"Dakota"	Kelly Jones	Language. Sex. Violence. Other? (2005)	4:12
2.	"The Bartender and the Thief"	Jones, Richard Jones, Stuart Cable	Performance and Cocktails (1999)	2:54
3.	"Just Looking"	Jones, Jones, Cable	Performance and Cocktails (1999)	4:13
4.	"Have a Nice Day"	Jones	Just Enough Education to Perform (2001)	3:24
5.	"Local Boy in the Photograph"	Jones, Jones, Cable	Word Gets Around (1997)	3:22
6.	"Maybe Tomorrow"	Jones	You Gotta Go There to Come Back (2003)	4:33
7.	"Superman" (single edit)	Jones	Language. Sex. Violence. Other? (2005)	3:52
8.	"Pick a Part That's New"	Jones	Performance and Cocktails (1999)	3:34
9.	"My Own Worst Enemy"	Jones, Adam Zindani	New song	3:35
10.	"I Wouldn't Believe Your Radio"	Jones, Jones, Cable	Performance and Cocktails (1999)	3:50
11.	"You're My Star"	Jones	New song	4:05
12.	"Mr. Writer" (single edit)	Jones, Marshall Bird	Just Enough Education to Perform (2001)	5:19
13.	"Step on My Old Size Nines"	Jones	Just Enough Education to Perform (2001)	4:00
14.	"Devil"	Jones	Language. Sex. Violence. Other? (2005)	4:40
15.	"It Means Nothing"	Jones	Pull the Pin (2007)	3:49
16.	"A Thousand Trees"	Jones, Jones, Cable	Word Gets Around (1997)	3:03
17.	"Vegas Two Times" (single edit)	Jones	Just Enough Education to Perform (2001)	3:39
18.	"Traffic"	Jones, Jones, Cable	Word Gets Around (1997)	4:54
19.	"More Life in a Tramps Vest"	Jones, Jones, Cable	Word Gets Around (1997)	2:20
20.	"Handbags and Gladrags"	Mike d'Abo	2002 re-release of Just Enough Education to Perform (2001)	4:37

All lyrics are written by Kelly Jones (except tracks 6 and 17).

Disc two (deluxe edition)
No.	Title	Music	Album	Length
1.	"Madame Helga"	Jones	You Gotta Go There to Come Back (2003)	3:55
2.	"Bank Holiday Monday"	Jones	Pull the Pin (2007)	3:15
3.	"Rewind"	Jones	Language. Sex. Violence. Other? (2005)	4:46
4.	"My Friends"	Jones	Pull the Pin (2007)	3:35
5.	"Climbing the Wall"	Jones	You Gotta Go There to Come Back (2003)	4:55
6.	"Mama Told Me Not to Come" (with Tom Jones)	Randy Newman	Reload (1999)	3:00
7.	"Since I Told You It's Over"	Jones	You Gotta Go There to Come Back (2003)	4:43
8.	"Moviestar"	Jones	2004 re-release of You Gotta Go There to Come Back (2003)	4:14
9.	"Not Up to You"	Jones, Jones, Cable	Word Gets Around (1997)	4:38
10.	"Getaway"	Jones	You Gotta Go There to Come Back (2003)	4:09
11.	"I Stopped to Fill My Car Up"	Jones, Jones, Cable	Performance and Cocktails (1999)	4:29
12.	"Carrot Cake and Wine"	Jones, Jones, Cable	B-side on "A Thousand Trees" (1997)	4:37
13.	"Billy Davey's Daughter"	Jones, Jones, Cable	Word Gets Around (1997)	3:45
14.	"Raymond's Shop"	Jones, Jones, Cable	B-side on "More Life in a Tramps Vest" (1997)	3:05
15.	"Stone"	Jones	Pull the Pin (2007)	4:17
16.	"I'm Alright (You Gotta Go There to Come Back)"	Jones	You Gotta Go There to Come Back (2003)	4:37
17.	"The First Time Ever I Saw Your Face" (with Jools Holland)	Ewan MacColl	B-side on "Handbags and Gladrags" (2001)	3:55
18.	"Same Size Feet"	Jones, Jones, Cable	Word Gets Around (1997)	4:00
19.	"She Takes Her Clothes Off"	Jones, Jones, Cable	Performance and Cocktails (1999)	3:15
20.	"Hurry Up and Wait"	Jones, Jones, Cable	Performance and Cocktails (1999)	4:40

== Charts ==
=== Weekly charts ===
Weekly albums chart
Chart (2008)	Peak position
Belgian Albums (Ultratop Flanders)	75
Irish Albums (IRMA)	16
Scottish Albums (Official Charts)	1
UK Albums (Official Charts)	2

=== Year-end charts ===
Year-end albums chart
Chart (2008)	Position
UK Albums (OCC)	13
Chart (2009)	Position
UK Albums (OCC)	69
Chart (2010)	Position
UK Albums (OCC)	110
Chart (2011)	Position
UK Albums (OCC)	191
Chart (2012)	Position
UK Albums (OCC)	118

=== Decade-end charts ===
Decade-end albums chart
Chart (2010–2019)	Position
UK Albums (OCC)	86

== Certifications ==
Region	Certification	Certified units/sales
Ireland (IRMA)	Gold	7,500^{^}
United Kingdom (BPI)	6× Platinum	1,800,000^{‡}
^{^} Shipments figures based on certification alone.^{‡} Sales+streaming figures based on certification alone.

== DVD ==
Decade in the Sun: Best of Stereophonics

Video by Stereophonics
- Released: 10 November 2008
- Genres: Rock; indie
- Length: 195:00
- Label: V2

Stereophonics chronology
Rewind (2007)	Decade in the Sun: Best of Stereophonics (2008)

Decade in the Sun: Best of Stereophonics is a DVD released by Welsh rock band Stereophonics, coinciding with their greatest hits album of the same name. The DVD features all music videos from the band's debut album, 1997's Word Gets Around, up to 2007's Pull the Pin, as well as the video for "You're My Star."

=== Track listing ===
1. More Life in a Tramps Vest
2. A Thousand Trees
3. Traffic
4. Local Boy in the Photograph (1998 version)
5. The Bartender and the Thief
6. Just Looking
7. Pick a Part That's New
8. I Wouldn't Believe Your Radio
9. Hurry Up and Wait
10. Mama Told Me Not to Come
11. Mr. Writer
12. Have A Nice Day
13. Step on My Old Size Nines
14. Handbags and Gladrags
15. Vegas Two Times
16. Madame Helga
17. Maybe Tomorrow
18. Since I Told You It's Over
19. Moviestar
20. Dakota
21. Superman
22. Devil
23. Rewind
24. It Means Nothing
25. You're My Star
