= Call Us What You Want but Don't Call Us in the Morning =

Video by Stereophonics
- Released: 12 December 2000
- Genre: Rock; britpop
- Length: 60:00
- Label: V2

Stereophonics chronology
| Performance and Cocktails: Live at Morfa Stadium (1999) | Call Us What You Want but Don't Call Us in the Morning (2000) | A Day at the Races (2002) |

Call Us What You Want but Don't Call Us in the Morning is a DVD released by Welsh rock trio Stereophonics. The DVD features all music videos from the band's first and second albums. It was released in 2000.

== Track listing ==
Word Gets Around

1. Local Boy in the Photograph (1997 version)
2. More Life in a Tramps Vest
3. A Thousand Trees
4. Traffic
5. Local Boy in the Photograph (1998 version)
6. Traffic (from Top of the Pops)

Performance and Cocktails

1. The Bartender and the Thief
2. Just Looking
3. Pick a Part That's New
4. I Wouldn't Believe Your Radio
5. Hurry Up and Wait
6. Mama Told Me Not to Come
