= Don't Let the Devil Take Another Day =

Live album by Kelly Jones
- Released: 4 December 2020
- Recorded: 2019
- Length: 110:58
- Label: Parlophone
- Producer: Kelly Jones

Kelly Jones chronology
Only the Names Have Been Changed (2007)	Don't Let the Devil Take Another Day (2020)	Far from Saints (2023)

Professional ratings
Review scores
Source	Rating
Classic Rock	3.5/5 stars
Gigwise	8/10 stars

Don't Let the Devil Take Another Day is the first live album by Stereophonics frontman Kelly Jones. The album features 21 tracks on two discs, eighteen Stereophonics tracks, two tracks from Jones' 2007 solo album Only the Names Have Been Changed and a cover version of the Kris Kristofferson song, "Help Me Make It Through the Night". The album was recorded in a variety of locations across Jones' 2019 solo tour.

The album was also accompanied by a documentary of the same name in which Jones discusses his personal life.

== Track listing ==
All songs written by Kelly Jones, except where noted.

=== Disc one ===
1. "Hurry Up and Wait" – 8:50
2. "You're My Star" – 6:05
3. "Suzy" – 5:54
4. "Katie" – 3:53
5. "I Wanna Get Lost with You" – 4:28
6. "Help Me Make It Through the Night" (Kris Kristofferson) – 4:06
7. "I Stopped to Fill My Car Up" – 6:16
8. "Before Anyone Knew Our Name" – 9:45
9. "Mr. Writer" – 5:17
10. "Rewind" – 5:57

=== Disc two ===
1. "Local Boy in the Photograph" – 5:41
2. "Feel" – 4:07
3. "Into the World" – 4:34
4. "This Life Ain't Easy (But It's the One That We All Got)" – 6:20
5. "Boy on a Bike" – 3:00
6. "No-One's Perfect" – 4:14
7. "Show Me How" – 4:29
8. "Maybe Tomorrow" – 4:09
9. "Traffic" – 5:04
10. "Just Looking" – 3:31
11. "Dakota" – 5:18

== Charts ==
Chart performance for Don't Let the Devil Take Another Day
Chart (2020)	Peak position
Irish Albums (IRMA)	72
Scottish Albums (OCC)	5
UK Albums (OCC)	8
