= Performance and Cocktails: Live at Morfa Stadium =

Video by Stereophonics
- Released: 1 November 1999
- Genre: Rock; britpop
- Length: 84:00
- Label: V2

Stereophonics chronology
| Live at Cardiff Castle (1998) | Performance and Cocktails: Live at Morfa Stadium (1999) | Call Us What You Want but Don't Call Us in the Morning (2000) |

Performance and Cocktails: Live at Morfa Stadium is a 1999 DVD released by Welsh Rock trio, Stereophonics. The DVD features live recordings from a concert at Morfa Stadium from 31 July 1999.

== Track listing ==
1. Hurry Up and Wait
2. The Bartender and the Thief
3. T-shirt Sun Tan
4. Pick a Part That's New
5. A Thousand Trees
6. Not Up To You
7. Check My Eyelids For Holes
8. I Wouldn't Believe Your Radio
9. She Takes Her Clothes Off
10. Sunny Afternoon
11. Is Yesterday, Tomorrow, Today?
12. Same Size Feet
13. Traffic
14. Last of the Big Time Drinkers
15. Just Looking
16. Looks Like Chaplin
17. Local Boy in the Photograph
18. Roll Up and Shine
19. Nice To Be Out
20. Billy Davey's Daughter
21. I Stopped To Fill My Car Up
