= More Life in a Tramps Vest =

1997 single by Stereophonics

Single by Stereophonics

from the album Word Gets Around
- B-side: "Raymond's Shop"
- Released: 19 May 1997
- Length: 2:19
- Label: V2
- Songwriters: Kelly Jones; Stuart Cable
- Producers: Steve Bush; Marshall Bird

Stereophonics singles chronology
"Local Boy in the Photograph" (1997)	"More Life in a Tramps Vest" (1997)	"A Thousand Trees" (1997)

"More Life in a Tramps Vest" is the second single released by Welsh rock band Stereophonics. The song is taken from the band's debut album, Word Gets Around (1997), and was released on 19 May 1997. It reached number 33 on the UK Singles Chart. The song is about life from the view of someone working on a market stall in Aberdare, whilst all the shops were closing down. The single's B-side, "Raymond's Shop", is featured on Stereophonics' greatest hits compilation album Decade in the Sun.

== Music video ==
The video shows various activities (such as shopping, riding a bus, playing football), but everyone has televisions for heads, which show many different things. The only people who don't have televisions for head are the band, who are shown performing in nearby Aberdare Market, where lead singer Kelly worked selling fruit and vegetables before the band were signed. The band then perform on traffic islands with traffic signs to nearby villages of Maerdy and Hirwaun.

== Track listings ==
All music was composed by Kelly Jones, Richard Jones and Stuart Cable. All lyrics were written by Kelly Jones.

CD 1

1. "More Life in a Tramps Vest" – 2:21
2. "Raymond's Shop" – 2:52
3. "Poppy Day" – 3:43

CD 2 - Live EP

1. "More Life in a Tramps Vest"
2. "Looks Like Chaplin"
3. "Too Many Sandwiches"
4. "Last of the Big Time Drinkers"
- All tracks recorded Live at Oxford Zodiac

7-inch vinyl

1. "More Life in a Tramps Vest" – 2:21
2. "Raymond's Shop" – 2:52

== Charts ==
Chart (1997–2000)	Peak position
Scotland Singles (OCC)	36
UK Singles (OCC)	33
UK Indie (OCC)	45

== Other versions ==
- A live version is included on CD2 of the "Traffic" single, it was recorded at the Belfort Festival.
- The live version of "Raymond's Shop" is on the Live at Cardiff Castle DVD and "The Bartender and the Thief" single.
