= Live at Cardiff Castle =

Video by Stereophonics
- Released: 1998
- Genre: Rock; britpop
- Length: 89:00
- Label: V2

Stereophonics chronology
Live at Cardiff Castle (1998)	Performance and Cocktails: Live at Morfa Stadium (1999)

Live at Cardiff Castle is a DVD released by Welsh Rock trio Stereophonics. The DVD features live recordings from a concert at Cardiff Castle on 12 June 1998.

== Track listing ==
1. Looks Like Chaplin
2. Check My Eyelids For Holes
3. "The Bartender and the Thief"
4. Same Size Feet
5. Traffic
6. Too Many Sandwiches
7. Not Up To You
8. T-shirt Suntan
9. "A Thousand Trees"
10. Carrot Cake And Wine
11. Is Yesterday, Tomorrow, Today?
12. Goldfish Bowl
13. Last of the Big Time Drinkers
14. "Local Boy in the Photograph"
15. She Takes Her Clothes Off
16. "I Wouldn't Believe Your Radio"
17. Billy Davey's Daughter
18. Raymond's Shop
19. "More Life in a Tramps Vest"
