= Moviestar (Stereophonics song) =

2004 single by Stereophonics

Single by Stereophonics

from the album You Gotta Go There to Come Back (re-issue)
- Released: 9 February 2004
- Length: 4:45 (album version); 4:05 (radio edit)
- Label: V2
- Songwriter(s): Kelly Jones
- Producer(s): Kelly Jones; Jim Lowe

Stereophonics singles chronology
"Since I Told You It's Over" (2003)	"Moviestar" (2004)	"Dakota" (2005)

Music video
- "Moviestar" on YouTube

"Moviestar" is a song by Welsh rock band Stereophonics, included on later editions of their fourth studio album, You Gotta Go There to Come Back. It was released as the fourth and final single from the album and was the first Stereophonics single released following the sacking of drummer Stuart Cable. The single peaked at number five on the UK Singles Chart, number 26 on the Irish Singles Chart, and number 85 on the Dutch Top 100.

== Background ==
A demo version of the song was released online in 2003 via the band's official website in a section called "The Place", where people would send a mobile phone text message (costing £1) to receive an access code to download the song in MP3 format. Due to high popularity and demand, the song was then fully mastered and finalized and released as a CD and DVD single on 9 February 2004. "Moviestar" was then included on a re-issue of the band's 2003 album, You Gotta Go There to Come Back.

== Track listings ==
UK and European CD1

1. "Moviestar" (full-length version) – 4:43
2. "Local Boy in the Photograph" (live) – 3:42

UK and European CD2

1. "Moviestar" (live) – 4:40
2. "The Bartender and the Thief" (live) – 3:47
3. "Help Me (She's Out of Her Mind)" (live) – 10:44
4. "Behind the Scenes on Tour" (video) – 2:00

UK and European DVD single

1. "Moviestar" (video) – 4:04
2. "Moviestar" (live) – 4:40
3. Behind the scenes footage from the recording of "Moviestar" – 1:59
4. "Moviestar" (audio—full-length version) – 4:43
5. "Climbing the Wall" (audio—live) – 4:45

== Charts ==
=== Weekly charts ===
Chart (2004)	Peak position
Ireland (IRMA)	26
Netherlands (Single Top 100)	85
Scotland (OCC)	6
UK Singles (OCC)	5
UK Indie (OCC)	1

=== Year-end charts ===
Chart (2004)	Position
UK Singles (OCC)	194

== Release history ==
Region	Date	Format(s)	Label	Ref.
United Kingdom	9 February 2004	CD; DVD	V2	
United States	24 May 2004	Triple A radio	V2	
