= A Thousand Trees =

1997 single by Stereophonics

Single by Stereophonics

from the album Word Gets Around
- B-side: "Carrot Cake & Wine"
- Released: 11 August 1997
- Length: 3:02
- Label: V2
- Songwriter: Kelly Jones
- Producers: Steve Bush & Marshall Bird (CD1); John Brand (CD2)

Stereophonics singles chronology
"More Life in a Tramps Vest" (1997)	"A Thousand Trees" (1997)	"Traffic" (1997)

Music video
- "A Thousand Trees" on YouTube

"A Thousand Trees" is the third single released by Welsh rock band Stereophonics. The song is taken from their debut album, Word Gets Around (1997), and was released on 11 August 1997. It reached number 22 on the UK Singles Chart.

== Background ==
According to Kelly Jones, the song is about "a football coach who did some very untowards stuff with younger kids" and whose reputation was subsequently "basically burned to the ground". Reflecting on "A Thousand Trees" in an interview with NME in 2017, Jones said: "It was a very weird incident, when I look back at it now as a 43-year-old man, to put it into a song – if you want the truth. It’s obviously very personal to a lot of people. But it was basically about rumours in a very small environment crushing someone’s reputation".

== Track listings ==
All music was composed by Kelly Jones, Richard Jones and Stuart Cable. All lyrics were written by Kelly Jones except where indicated.

CD 1

1. "A Thousand Trees" – 3:03
2. "Carrot Cake & Wine" – 4:27
3. "A Thousand Trees" (Live at Oxford Zodiac 23.3.97) – 3:39

CD 2 - Acoustic EP

1. "A Thousand Trees"
2. "Home to Me"
3. "Looks Like Chaplin"
4. "Summertime" (George Gershwin, DuBose Heyward)

7-inch vinyl

1. "A Thousand Trees" – 3:03
2. "Carrot Cake & Wine" – 4:27

== Charts ==
Chart (1997–2000)	Peak position
Scotland Singles (OCC)	21
UK Singles (OCC)	22
UK Indie (OCC)	18

== Certifications ==
Region	Certification	Certified units/sales
United Kingdom (BPI)	Gold	400,000^{‡}
^{‡} Sales+streaming figures based on certification alone.

== Other versions ==
- A live version of "A Thousand Trees" and "Carrot Cake & Wine" is included in the live album Live From Dakota.
- The video can be found on the Call Us What You Want But Don't Call Us in the Morning DVD.
- The song is also performed on the Live at Cardiff Castle, Live at Morfa Stadium and Live from Dakota DVDs.
