= Word Gets Around =

Studio album by Stereophonics
- Released: 25 August 1997
- Recorded: October 1992 – February 1997
- Genres: Rock; indie rock; Britpop
- Length: 42:02
- Label: V2
- Producers: Bird & Bush

Stereophonics chronology
| Word Gets Around (1997) | Performance and Cocktails (1999) |

Singles from Word Gets Around
- 1. "Local Boy in the Photograph" Released: 17 March 1997; 2. "More Life in a Tramps Vest" Released: 19 May 1997; 3. "A Thousand Trees" Released: 11 August 1997; 4. "Traffic" Released: 27 October 1997

Professional ratings
Review scores
| Source | Rating |
|---|---|
| AllMusic | 3.5/5 stars |
| Galeria Musical | 4/5 stars |
| Kerrang! | 4/5 stars |
| NME | 7/10 |
| Pitchfork | 5.8/10 |
| Vox | 8/10 |

Word Gets Around is the debut studio album by Welsh rock band Stereophonics. It was released on 25 August 1997 through V2 Records and reached number six on the UK Albums Chart, making it one of four Stereophonics albums not to reach number one; the other three being 2009's Keep Calm and Carry On, which reached number eleven, 2013's Graffiti on the Train, which went to number three and 2017's Scream Above the Sounds, which just missed the top spot.

Much of the album is written about everyday life in Cwmaman, the band's hometown. The deluxe and super-deluxe editions were released on 18 October 2010. The name of the album comes from lyrics in the album's last song, "Billy Davey's Daughter".

== Track listing ==
All lyrics are written by Kelly Jones; all music is composed by Stereophonics.

| No. | Title | Length |
|---|---|---|
| 1. | "A Thousand Trees" | 3:02 |
| 2. | "Looks Like Chaplin" | 2:32 |
| 3. | "More Life in a Tramps Vest" | 2:19 |
| 4. | "Local Boy in the Photograph" | 3:22 |
| 5. | "Traffic" | 4:54 |
| 6. | "Not Up to You" | 4:37 |
| 7. | "Check My Eyelids for Holes" | 2:43 |
| 8. | "Same Size Feet" | 4:00 |
| 9. | "Last of the Big Time Drinkers" | 2:45 |
| 10. | "Goldfish Bowl" | 3:03 |
| 11. | "Too Many Sandwiches" | 5:01 |
| 12. | "Billy Davey's Daughter" | 3:45 |
| Total length: | | 42:02 |

== Re-release ==
On 24 August 2010, Stereophonics announced on their website that Word Gets Around, along with Performance and Cocktails, was to be re-released. To accompany the re-releases, Stereophonics performed all the songs off both the albums at the Hammersmith Apollo on 17 and 18 October 2010. They were released on 18 October 2010 and were made into two forms:

=== Track listing ===
Deluxe: The original album on one disc and a bonus CD featuring 12 b-sides and rare tracks.

CD 2 (B-Sides and rarities)
| No. | Title | Original release | Length |
|---|---|---|---|
| 1. | "Carrot Cake and Wine" | B-side on "A Thousand Trees" | 4:28 |
| 2. | "Tie Me Up Tie Me Down" | B-side on "Traffic" | 2:17 |
| 3. | "Poppy Day" | B-side on "More Life in a Tramps Vest" | 3:41 |
| 4. | "Raymond's Shop" | B-side on "More Life in a Tramps Vest" | 2:54 |
| 5. | "Chris Chambers" | B-side on "Traffic" | 3:42 |
| 6. | "A Thousand Trees" (BBC Radio 1 Evening Session) | | 3:15 |
| 7. | "Local Boy in the Photograph" (BBC Radio 1 Evening Session) | | 3:13 |
| 8. | "Looks Like Chaplin" (Live at Newcastle University) | | 3:38 |
| 9. | "Same Size Feet" (Live at Newcastle University) | | 4:10 |
| 10. | "Not up to You" (Live at Newcastle University) | | 6:45 |
| 11. | "She Takes Her Clothes Off" (Decade in the Sun Deluxe Word Gets Around session) | | 3:17 |
| 12. | "More Life in a Tramps Vest" (Pre-record deal Grass-roots demo) | | 2:43 |
| 13. | "The Last Resort" (Eagles cover) | B-side on "Local Boy in the Photograph" | 6:23 |
| Total length: | | | 50:26 |

Super deluxe: The album on one disc (as listed above) and two bonus CDs (one with 15 b-sides and the other includes 10 rare tracks), artcards and a replica of Kelly Jones' notebook.

CD 2 (B-Sides)
| No. | Title | Original release | Length |
|---|---|---|---|
| 1. | "Carrot Cake and Wine" | B-side on "A Thousand Trees" | 4:28 |
| 2. | "Tie Me Up Tie Me Down" | B-side on "Traffic" | 2:17 |
| 3. | "Poppy Day" | B-side on "More Life in a Tramps Vest" | 3:41 |
| 4. | "Raymond's Shop" | B-side on "More Life in a Tramps Vest" | 2:54 |
| 5. | "Chris Chambers" | B-side on "Traffic" | 3:42 |
| 6. | "Who'll Stop the Rain (Creedence Clearwater Revival cover)" | B-side on "Local Boy in the Photograph | 2:32 |
| 7. | "Home to Me" | B-side on "A Thousand Trees | 3:25 |
| 8. | "Buy Myself a Small Plane" | B-side on "Local Boy in the Photograph" | 3:15 |
| 9. | "The Last Resort" (Eagles cover) | B-side on "Local Boy in the Photograph" | 6:23 |
| 10. | "Summertime" | B-side on "A Thousand Trees" | 3:25 |
| Total length: | | | 36:02 |

CD 3 (Rarities)
| No. | Title | Length |
|---|---|---|
| 1. | "A Thousand Trees" (BBC Radio 1 Evening Session) | 3:15 |
| 2. | "Local Boy in the Photograph" (BBC Radio 1 Evening Session) | 3:13 |
| 3. | "Same Size Feet" (Live at Newcastle University) | 4:10 |
| 4. | "Looks Like Chaplin" (Live at Newcastle University) | 3:38 |
| 5. | "Not up to You" (Live at Newcastle University) | 6:45 |
| 6. | "More Life in a Tramps Vest" (Pre-record deal Grass-roots demo) | 2:43 |
| 7. | "Looks Like Chaplin" (Pre-record deal - Grass-roots demo) | 2:28 |
| 8. | "In My Day" (Pre-record deal - Grass-roots demo) | 2:58 |
| 9. | "She Takes Her Clothes Off" (Decade in the Sun Deluxe Word Gets Around session) | 3:17 |
| 10. | "Looks Like Chaplin" (Acoustic) | 2:46 |
| 11. | "A Thousand Trees" (Acoustic) | 3:19 |
| Total length: | | 38:32 |

== Personnel ==
Stereophonics

- Stuart Cable – drums
- Kelly Jones – vocals, guitars
- Richard Jones – bass

Additional

- Marshall Bird – keyboards
- Nadia Lannman – cello on "Billy Davey's Daughter"
- Richard Payne – accordion on "Not Up to You"

Technical

- Bird & Bush – producer, engineer, mixing
- Bob Ludwig – mastering
- Lee Dunn – artwork, design
- Emma Jones – studio assistant

== Charts ==
=== Weekly charts ===
| Chart (1997–2000) | Peak position |
|---|---|
| Australian Albums (ARIA) | 71 |
| French Albums (SNEP) | 35 |
| Irish Albums (IRMA) | 29 |
| New Zealand Albums (RMNZ) | 8 |
| Scottish Albums (Official Charts) | 17 |
| UK Albums (Official Charts) | 6 |

=== Year-end charts ===
| Chart (1998) | Position |
|---|---|
| UK Albums (OCC) | 65 |
| Chart (1999) | Position |
| UK Albums (OCC) | 71 |
| Chart (2000) | Position |
| UK Albums (OCC) | 74 |
| Chart (2001) | Position |
| UK Albums (OCC) | 170 |

== Certifications ==
| Region | Certification | Certified units/sales |
|---|---|---|
| United Kingdom (BPI) | 3× Platinum | 900,000^{*} |
^{*} Sales figures based on certification alone.
