= Live from London EP =

EP (Live) by Stereophonics
- Released: 27 April 2005
- Recorded: 2005
- Genre: Rock
- Label: V2 Records
- Producer: Jim Lowe

Stereophonics chronology
Language. Sex. Violence. Other? (2005)	Live from London EP (2005)	Live from Dakota (2006)

Live from London EP is the first live EP by rock band Stereophonics. It was released exclusively to the iTunes Store as part of the Live from London series. The band performed at the Apple Store in Regent Street, London to 250 people on 19 April 2005. It was the first time a band had performed there and released songs recorded there.

== Track listing ==
iTunes
No.	Title	Length
1.	"Superman"
2.	"Doorman"
3.	"Devil"
4.	"Dakota"
5.	"Pedalpusher"

7" vinyl Side A
No.	Title	Length
1.	"Doorman"

Side B
No.	Title	Length
1.	"Pedalpusher"
