= Only the Names Have Been Changed =

Studio album by Kelly Jones
- Released: 26 March 2007
- Recorded: 7–12 January 2007
- Genre: Pop
- Length: 34:20
- Label: V2
- Producer: Jones & Jim Lowe

Kelly Jones chronology
Only the Names Have Been Changed (2007)	Don't Let the Devil Take Another Day (2020)

Professional ratings
Review scores
Source	Rating
Contactmusic	positive
Indiecision	B+
Mansized	4/5 stars
NME	4/10

Only the Names Have Been Changed is the 2007 debut solo album by Stereophonics frontman Kelly Jones.

== Background ==
As Jones explains, "... we were recording the sixth Stereophonics album... and in-between takes I started doing these songs off the cuff. Three or four tracks in I realised that this could actually be something... strange how it's always little things that makes big things happen. We didn't wait – it was recorded 7 and 8 January and mastered by Friday the 12th... every song is a live take... we actively decided to make it a bit more filmic. In two days we put down 10 tracks with 10 different girls names... we wanted to do something in the vein of Nick Cave's Murder Ballads or Johnny Cash's Blood, Sweat and Tears."

Interviewed for The Guardian in 2013, Jones was asked if the names of the songs were named after his ex-girlfriends. He replied: "No. It started as a joke. I had two songs called Susie and Jane and said: "If we had another eight, we could call it Only the Names Have Been Changed." It went to No 1, I went out and got drunk and got caught peeing in the street in Camden. They gave me an £80 fine. That's my main memory."

== Track listing ==
Only the Names Have Been Changed track listing
No.	Title	Length
1.	"Suzy"	5:07
2.	"Rosie"	3:07
3.	"Liberty"	4:04
4.	"Katie"	3:37
5.	"Violet"	1:54
6.	"Jayne"	5:00
7.	"Misty"	1:24
8.	"Emily"	3:27
9.	"Jean"	3:24
10.	"Summer"	3:16
Total length:		34:20
