= You're My Star =

Single by Stereophonics

from the album Decade in the Sun: Best of Stereophonics
- B-side: "Forever"
- Released: 27 October 2008
- Recorded: 2008
- Genre: Pop rock
- Length: 4:07
- Label: Universal
- Songwriter(s): Kelly Jones
- Producer(s): Jones, Jim Lowe

Stereophonics singles chronology
"My Friends" (2007)	"You're My Star" (2008)	"Innocent" (2009)

Music video
- "You're My Star" on YouTube

"You're My Star" is a pop rock song by Welsh rock band Stereophonics from their greatest hits album, Decade in the Sun: Best of Stereophonics. It was released as the lead-single on 27 October 2008 with "Forever" as the B-side. It was produced by lead-singer and guitarist Kelly Jones along with Jim Lowe while written by the singer. The song was written in a day and is a personal one to Jones, though he would not say what the song is really about, instead leaving it to listeners to make up their own theory. The song is written about his daughter. The single went on to become the band's first to miss the top 100 of the UK Singles Chart (Note: This does not include "Looks Like Chaplin" or "Lying in the Sun", which were not eligible to chart. "Looks Like Chaplin" was given a limited edition release, and "Lying in the Sun" was available only to the band's fan club.) and received a negative critic review.

== Writing ==
Jones wrote the song at a hotel room in Chelsea, London in a day along the other new song for the best of album, "My Own Worst Enemy". He has described it as a personal song about "spending time with people that are very precious to you. And when that time disappears how much you miss that time and you want it back again." He concluded that he'll leave the song for listeners to interpret their own way rather than directly say what the song is about. During the recording sessions, "You're My Star" started out as a country song then into an electronic one before becoming a pop rock song.

== Music video ==
The music video was directed by Luc Janin, his original idea was to shoot the video in India but due to the monsoon season it was instead shot in Egham, Surrey. Jones described Janin's approach as taking the "literal lyric content and [throwing] it away." The video shows the band playing the song at an Indian Holi Festival, including clips of the crowd wearing white clothes and throwing paint at the band and each other. The first half of the video is shown in black and white, when the second chorus starts paint is thrown and the video is then shown in colour. This was Adam Zindani's first music video with Stereophonics.

== Critical response ==
Reviewing the single, Alex Lai from Contactmusic.com had a generally negative response towards it. Stating it's "rare that songs recorded especially for this type of compilation prove to be a worthy addition to the band's catalogue and this is no exception to the rule," he went on to call it a mediocre song, though he did call Jones' lyrics "sweet" and his vocals during the chorus "passionate".

== Track listing ==
All tracks are written by Kelly Jones

Vinyl – Side one
No.	Title	Length
1.	"You're My Star"	4:30

Vinyl – Side two
No.	Title	Length
2.	"Forever"	4:21
Total length:		8:51

"You're My Star" – CD 1
No.	Title	Length
1.	"You're My Star"	4:30

== Personnel ==
Stereophonics

- Kelly Jones – lead vocals, guitar, piano
- Richard Jones – bass guitar
- Javier Weyler – drums
- Adam Zindani – guitar

Additional

- Jim Lowe – keyboards, programming

Technical

- Production – Kelly Jones, Jim Lowe
- Mixing – Bob Clearmountain
- Engineering – Lowe
- Mastering – Bob Ludwig
