= Traffic (Stereophonics song) =

1997 single by Stereophonics

Single by Stereophonics

from the album Word Gets Around
- B-side: "Tie Me Up Tie Me Down"
- Released: 27 October 1997
- Length: 4:54 (album version); 4:25 (radio edit)
- Label: V2
- Songwriter: Kelly Jones
- Producers: Steve Bush; Marshall Bird

Stereophonics singles chronology
| "A Thousand Trees" (1997) | "Traffic" (1997) | "Local Boy in the Photograph" (reissue) (1998) |

"Traffic" is the fourth single released by Welsh rock band Stereophonics. It is taken from their debut album, Word Gets Around (1997), and was released on 27 October 1997. The song reached number 20 on the UK Singles Chart and number 21 in Iceland.

== Track listing ==
All music was composed by Kelly Jones, Richard Jones, and Stuart Cable. All lyrics were written by Kelly Jones.

CD 1

1. "Traffic" (radio edit) – 4:25
2. "Tie Me Up Tie Me Down" – 2:15
3. "Chris Chambers" – 3:41
4. "Traffic" (album version) – 4:53

CD 2 Live Festival EP

1. "Traffic"
2. "More Life in a Tramp's Vest"
3. "A Thousand Trees"
4. "Local Boy in the Photograph"
- All tracks recorded live at Belfort, France

7-inch vinyl

1. "Traffic"
2. "Tie Me Up Tie Me Down"
- Same track listing for cassette single.

== Charts ==
| Chart (1997) | Peak position |
|---|---|
| Iceland (Íslenski Listinn Topp 40) | 21 |
| Scotland Singles (Official Charts) | 14 |
| UK Singles (Official Charts) | 20 |
| UK Indie (Official Charts) | 3 |

== Certifications ==
| Region | Certification | Certified units/sales |
|---|---|---|
| United Kingdom (BPI) | Silver | 200,000^{‡} |
^{‡} Sales+streaming figures based on certification alone.

== Other versions ==
- A live version was on the band's first live album, Live from Dakota.
- Another live version was included on the single "The Bartender and the Thief".
- The song is also performed on the Live at Cardiff Castle and Live at Morfa Stadium. The video can be found on the Call Us What You Want But Don't Call Us in the Morning DVD.
