= Morfa Stadium =

Coordinates: 51.64390°N 3.92623°W

Morfa Stadium was an athletics stadium in the Landore area of Swansea, Wales. Constructed and in use since 1980, it was officially opened as Morfa Stadium on 20 April 1989 by Queen Elizabeth II and the Duke of Edinburgh. The stadium was subsequently used as a residential training facility for the local Swansea Harriers Athletics Club; which produced numerous local, national, international, Commonwealth, Olympic and world competitors. It has now been demolished and the land is occupied by the Morfa Retail Park and the Swansea.com Stadium, home of the city's football and rugby teams, which opened in 2005.

Stereophonics played a concert at the stadium on 31 July 1999. The concert film, Performance and Cocktails: Live at Morfa Stadium, was released on 1 November 1999.
