= Hurry Up and Wait (song) =

1999 single by Stereophonics

Single by Stereophonics

from the album Performance and Cocktails
- B-side: "Angie"
- Written: October–November 1997
- Released: 8 November 1999
- Studio: Parkgate (East Sussex, England)
- Length: 4:40
- Label: V2
- Composers: Kelly Jones; Richard Jones; Stuart Cable
- Lyricist: Kelly Jones
- Producers: Bird & Bush

Stereophonics singles chronology
"I Wouldn't Believe Your Radio" (1999)	"Hurry Up and Wait" (1999)	"Mama Told Me Not to Come" (2000)

Music video
- "Hurry Up and Wait" on YouTube

"Hurry Up and Wait" is a song by Welsh rock band Stereophonics, released as the fifth and final single from their second album, Performance and Cocktails (1999), on 8 November 1999. The song reached number 11 on the UK Singles Chart, as did previous single "I Wouldn't Believe Your Radio". It also reached number 23 in Ireland, becoming the band's fifth top-30 hit there.

The song is track three on the album. A live version from Morfa Stadium is on CD2 of the "Hurry Up and Wait" singles. An acoustic version is on CD2 on the "Mr. Writer" single. The music video features the band parodying the 1970 film M*A*S*H.

== Track listings ==
UK CD1

1. "Hurry Up and Wait"
2. "Angie" (Rolling Stones cover)
3. "I Wouldn't Believe Your Radio" (Stuart Cable version)

UK CD2

1. "Hurry Up and Wait" (live at Morfa Stadium)
2. "I Stopped to Fill My Car Up" (live at Morfa Stadium)
3. "Billy Davey's Daughter" (live at Morfa Stadium)

UK cassette single

1. "Hurry Up and Wait"
2. "Angie" (Rolling Stones cover)

== Credits and personnel ==
Credits are taken from the Performance and Cocktails album booklet.

Recording

- Written from October to November 1997 on a tour bus
- Recorded at Parkgate (East Sussex, England)
- Mastered at Metropolis (London, England)

Personnel

- Kelly Jones – music, lyrics, vocals, guitar
- Richard Jones – music, bass
- Stuart Cable – music, drums
- Marshall Bird – keyboards
- Bird & Bush – production
- Al Clay – mixing
- Ian Cooper – mastering

== Charts ==
Chart (1999)	Peak position
Europe (Eurochart Hot 100)	44
Ireland (IRMA)	23
Scotland Singles (OCC)	8
UK Singles (OCC)	11
UK Indie (OCC)	1
