= The Bartender and the Thief =

1998 single by Stereophonics

Single by Stereophonics

from the album Performance and Cocktails
- B-side: "She Takes Her Clothes Off"; "Fiddler's Green"; "Traffic" (live); 1. "Raymond's Shop" (live)
- Written: April 1998
- Released: 9 November 1998
- Studio: Real World (Bath, Somerset, England)
- Length: 2:54 (album version); 3:09 (single version)
- Label: V2
- Composers: Kelly Jones; Richard Jones; Stuart Cable
- Lyricist: Kelly Jones
- Producers: Bird & Bush

Stereophonics singles chronology
"Local Boy in the Photograph" (1998)	"The Bartender and the Thief" (1998)	"Just Looking" (1999)

Music video
- "The Bartender and the Thief" on YouTube

"The Bartender and the Thief" is a song by Welsh rock band Stereophonics, written by the band in April 1998. The song is the second track on their second album, Performance and Cocktails (1999). "Bartender" was the first single taken from Performance and Cocktails and was released on 9 November 1998, reaching number three on the UK Singles Chart. The music video features the band playing at Kanchanaburi Province, Thailand, and is based on the Francis Ford Coppola movie Apocalypse Now.

== Versions ==
The track's full-length intro is only included on the CD1 single and in the music video but was edited off the album. A live version from Cardiff Castle is available on CD2 of the single. Another live version from Sheffield Arena is on the "Moviestar" single. A bar version of the song is on CD 1 of the "I Wouldn't Believe Your Radio" single.

== Live performances ==
The song, which is one of Stereophonics' heavier tracks, is frequently played amongst their live sets. During live performances, vocalist Kelly Jones has been known to use the two bars without vocals before the final chorus to reference the Motörhead song "Ace of Spades". The lyrics therefore are "The ace of spades, the ace of spades. The bartender and the thief were lovers..."

== Track listings ==
UK CD1

1. "The Bartender and the Thief"
2. "She Takes Her Clothes Off"
3. "Fiddler's Green" (The Tragically Hip)

UK CD2

1. "The Bartender and the Thief" (live from Cardiff Castle)
2. "Traffic" (live from Cardiff Castle)
3. "Raymond's Shop" (live from Cardiff Castle)

UK 7-inch and cassette single

1. "The Bartender and the Thief"
2. "She Takes Her Clothes Off"

European and Australian CD single

1. "The Bartender and the Thief"
2. "She Takes Her Clothes Off"
3. "The Bartender and the Thief" (live)
4. "Traffic" (live)
5. "Raymond's Shop" (live)

== Credits and personnel ==
Credits are taken from the Performance and Cocktails album booklet.

Recording

- Written in April 1998
- Recorded at Real World (Bath, Somerset, England)
- Mastered at Metropolis (London, England)

Personnel

- Kelly Jones – music, lyrics, vocals, guitar
- Richard Jones – music, bass
- Stuart Cable – music, drums
- Marshall Bird – keyboards
- Bird & Bush – production
- Al Clay – mixing
- Ian Cooper – mastering

== Charts ==
=== Weekly charts ===
Chart (1998)	Peak position
Europe (Eurochart Hot 100)	22
Ireland (IRMA)	30
Scotland Singles (OCC)	3
UK Singles (OCC)	3
UK Indie (OCC)	1

=== Year-end charts ===
Chart (1998)	Position
UK Singles (OCC)	154

== Certifications ==
Region	Certification	Certified units/sales
United Kingdom (BPI)	Gold	400,000^{‡}
^{‡} Sales+streaming figures based on certification alone.
