= Local Boy in the Photograph =

1997 single by Stereophonics

Single by Stereophonics

from the album Word Gets Around
- B-side: "Too Many Sandwiches"; "Who'll Stop the Rain?" (1998)
- Released: 17 March 1997
- Genre: Rock; Britpop
- Length: 3:22
- Label: V2
- Songwriters: Kelly Jones; Richard Jones; Stuart Cable

Stereophonics singles chronology
"Local Boy in the Photograph" (1997)	"More Life in a Tramps Vest" (1997)
"Traffic" (1997)	"Local Boy in the Photograph" (1998)	"The Bartender and the Thief" (1998)

"Local Boy in the Photograph" is the first single by rock band Stereophonics. The song is taken from their debut album, Word Gets Around and was released on 17 March 1997. It reached number 51 on the UK Singles Chart. On 9 February 1998, the song was re-released and reached number 14 on the same chart.

== Title and lyrics ==
During an interview with Sky Arts HD after his performance at the Hay Festival in June 2010, Kelly Jones explained the meaning of a few of his songs and said that "Local Boy in the Photograph" was based on the true story of local boy Paul David Boggis, who was killed by a train travelling between Cwmbach and Aberdare. All the songs on the album are about people and events in the Aberdare area.

== Stuart Cable ==
Following the death of former Stereophonics drummer Stuart Cable, a campaign was launched on Facebook to get the song to number one on the UK charts. On 13 June 2010, it re-entered the UK charts at number 60.

== Track listings ==
All music written by Kelly Jones, Richard Jones and Stuart Cable. All lyrics composed by Kelly Jones, except where indicated.

=== Initial release (1997) ===
CD
No.	Title	Length
1.	"Local Boy in the Photograph"	3:24
2.	"Looks Like Chaplin" (Not included on UK editions)	2:33
3.	"Too Many Sandwiches"	4:30
4.	"Buy Myself a Small Plane"	3:15

7-inch vinyl
No.	Title	Length
1.	"Local Boy in the Photograph"	3:24
2.	"Too Many Sandwiches"	4:30

=== Re-release (1998) ===
CD 1
No.	Title	Writer(s)	Length
1.	"Local Boy in the Photograph"		3:23
2.	"Who'll Stop the Rain?"	John Fogerty	2:31
3.	"Check My Eyelids for Holes"		2:42
4.	"Local Boy in the Photograph" (video)		3:17

CD 2
No.	Title	Writer(s)	Length
1.	"Local Boy in the Photograph"		3:25
2.	"Not Up to You" (Live at XFM)		4:41
3.	"The Last Resort" (Eagles cover)	Don Henley, Glenn Frey	6:21
4.	"Traffic" (video)		4:22

7-inch vinyl
No.	Title	Writer(s)	Length
1.	"Local Boy in the Photograph"		3:23
2.	"Who'll Stop the Rain?"	John Fogerty	2:31

== Personnel ==
Stereophonics

- Stuart Cable – drums
- Kelly Jones – vocals, guitar
- Richard Jones – bass guitar

== Charts ==
Chart (1997)	Peak position
Scotland Singles (OCC)	59
UK Singles (OCC)	51

Chart (1998)	Peak position
Europe (Eurochart Hot 100)	74
Ireland (IRMA)	28
Scotland Singles (OCC)	10
UK Singles (OCC)	14
UK Indie (OCC)	2

Chart (2010)	Peak position
UK Singles (OCC)	60

== Certifications ==
Region	Certification	Certified units/sales
United Kingdom (BPI)	Gold	400,000^{‡}
^{‡} Sales+streaming figures based on certification alone.

== Other versions ==
- A live version was included on the "Traffic" single, live from Belfort Festival.
- A semi-acoustic version recorded for Radio One was released on the "Just Looking" single.
- A live version was included on the "Moviestar" single, recorded at SECC, Glasgow.
- A live version was included on the band's first live album, Live from Dakota.
