= Kelly Jones =

Welsh rock musician (born 1974)

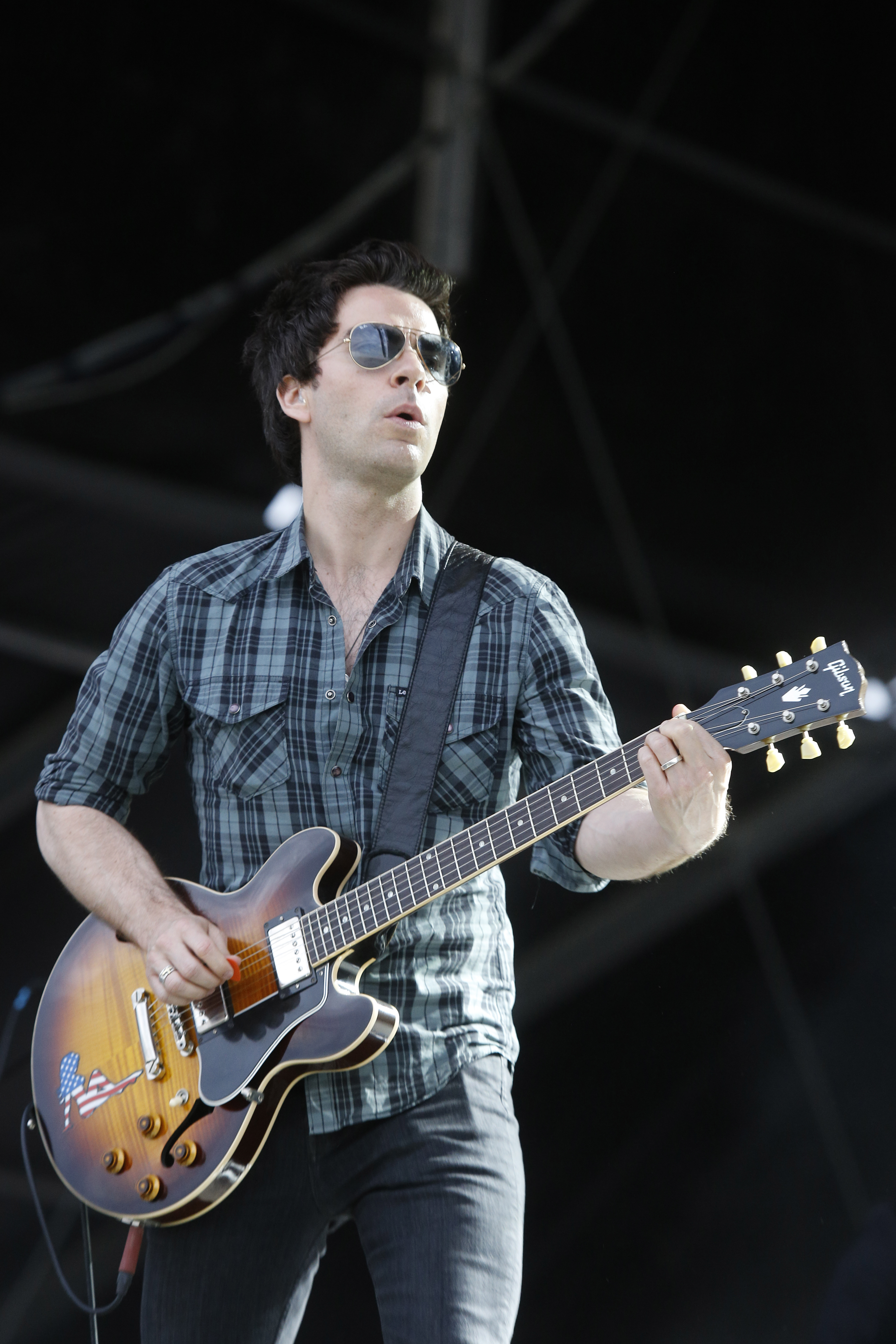
- Jones in 2013
- Born: 3 June 1974 (age 52); Cwmaman, Wales
- Occupations: Singer-songwriter; guitarist
- Years active: 1992–present
- Spouse: Jakki Healy (m. 2013)
- Partner: Rebecca Walters (2003–2007)
- Children: 4
- Musical career
- Genres: Rock; post-Britpop; soul
- Instruments: Vocals; guitar; piano
- Label: Stylus Records
- Member of: Stereophonics; Far from Saints
- Website: stereophonics.com

Kelly Jones (born 3 June 1974) is a Welsh musician and a founding member, lead singer, and guitarist of the rock band Stereophonics.

== Early life and debut ==
Kelly Jones was born, on 3 June 1974, the youngest of three boys to Beryl and Arwyn Jones in the small Welsh former mining village of Cwmaman, Mid Glamorgan, spending his childhood with them and his two older brothers, Kevin and Lee.

Both of his parents worked in factories. His father coached youth football and pursued his own singing career. The name of Arwyn's backing band, Oscar and the Kingfishers, earned him the nickname 'Oscar' among friends and family. He went on to secure a record deal with Polydor, who renamed him 'Arwyn Davidson' due to the sheer number of Joneses in the music business at the time. Despite making multiple recordings, sharing the Hollies' manager and supporting slots with the likes of Roy Orbison, Arwyn had minimal mainstream success and only released a few singles (including a cover of the Graham Nash song "Simple Man").

During Jones' youth his uncle, a boxing referee, got him interested in the sport, and he later competed at a high level in South Wales. Following this Jones moved onto football, where he played for his county. Jones grew up in the village of Cwmaman, where he became friends with neighbours, Stuart Cable and Richard Jones (no relation to Kelly), with whom he formed, in 1992, one of a string of covers bands.

Jones' talent for writing was apparent in his youth. He studied film at college and considered becoming a scriptwriter – attracting interest from the BBC for his work – before focusing on music. As his band progressed from covers to performing original material, Jones brought his gift for narrative to his lyrics. He also flirted with the idea of a career in boxing, and was a successful fighter at junior levels.

There is a strong autobiographical thread to Jones' writing on Stereophonics' 1997 debut album, Word Gets Around, including an account of his teenage years working on a market stall, "More Life in a Tramps Vest".

== Career ==
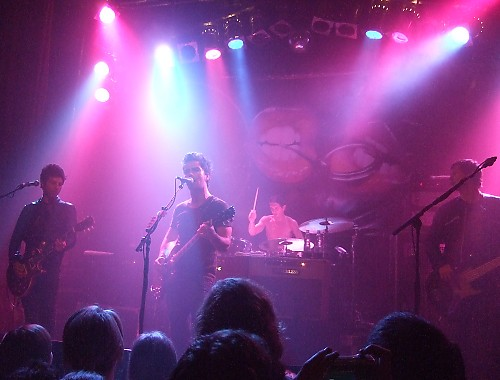
Kelly Jones and the Stereophonics September 2007

In 1996, after several years on the south Wales live circuit, Stereophonics were the first band to be signed to Richard Branson's new Virgin Records label V2. Their debut EP Looks Like Chaplin was not pressed in enough numbers to qualify for the charts, and their next single Local Boy in the Photograph peaked one place shy of the UK top 50. However, their debut LP Word Gets Around, helped by a busy touring schedule that included a support slot on fellow Welsh band Manic Street Preachers' 1996–97 tour, peaked at number 6 on the UK Albums Chart.

In January 2005, Kelly Jones performed a solo set at the Tsunami Relief Cardiff charity concert at the Millennium Stadium in Cardiff.

=== Other projects ===
In 2007, Jones released his first solo album, Only the Names Have Been Changed, as a limited edition, which managed to reach number 1 on the iTunes download chart. He explained: "We were recording the sixth Stereophonics album last year and in-between takes I started doing these songs off the cuff. Three or four tracks in, I realised that this could actually be something [...] strange how it's always little things that makes big things happen." This created speculation that Jones would leave Stereophonics to pursue his solo career; however, he denied this.

In 2023, under the name Far from Saints, Jones together with Patty Lynn and Dwight Baker of the American band the Wind and the Wave (who had been tourmates with Stereophonics), released their self-titled debut album.

== Influences and musical style ==
Jones is influenced by musicians such as Neil Young, Bob Dylan, Otis Redding, Stevie Wonder, Led Zeppelin, AC/DC and the Sex Pistols. He is noted for his raspy voice, which has been described as "whiskey" and has drawn criticism as well as acclaim.

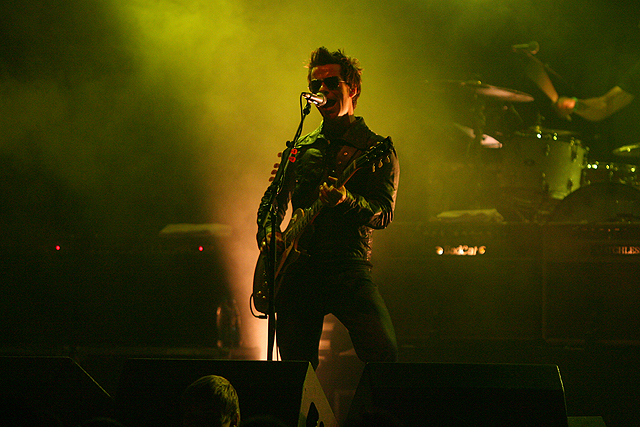
Jones playing his Gibson Les Paul Goldtop in 2007.

== Controversy ==
Jones has had a troubled relationship with the national tabloid press and they have often criticised him, his contribution to music, and his vocal abilities. Jones has generated headlines several times by criticising fellow musical artists, most notably Radiohead frontman and solo artist Thom Yorke. Jones criticised Yorke's attitude in a 2002 interview due to what he felt was complaining about touring on Radiohead's 1998 home video release, Meeting People Is Easy. He said: "We can all relate to that video – y'know, having to do a hundred fucking idents for radio stations – but that doesn't mean you've got to walk around and be a miserable twat to everybody. Which is what Thom Yorke is mostly." He later expressed regret for this comment, since he was a fan of Yorke.

Jones is known for his cynical view of manufactured pop and has also criticised reality shows such as Popstars and The X Factor, as well as manufactured bands such as Hear'Say.

== Personal life ==
In 2002, Jones was arrested for vandalism; the state later declined to press charges. Jones wrote the song "Rainbows and Pots of Gold" in response to the event. Jones and Rebecca Walters have two children; the couple split shortly after the birth of the second child. Jones then married MTV journalist Jakki Healy; they have two children.

Influenced as a child by his older brothers, Kevin and Lee, Jones has been a life-long supporter of Leeds United Football Club.

== Discography ==
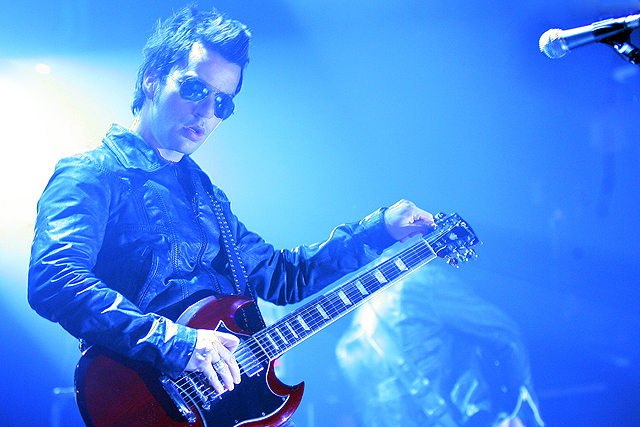
Jones in July 2007

=== Studio albums ===
Studio albums by Kelly Jones
Title	Year
Only the Names Have Been Changed	2007
Inevitable Incredible	2024

=== Live albums ===
Live albums by Kelly Jones
Title	Year	Chart positions
Title	Year	UK
Don't Let the Devil Take Another Day	2020	8
