= Stuart Cable =

Welsh drummer and broadcaster (1970–2010)

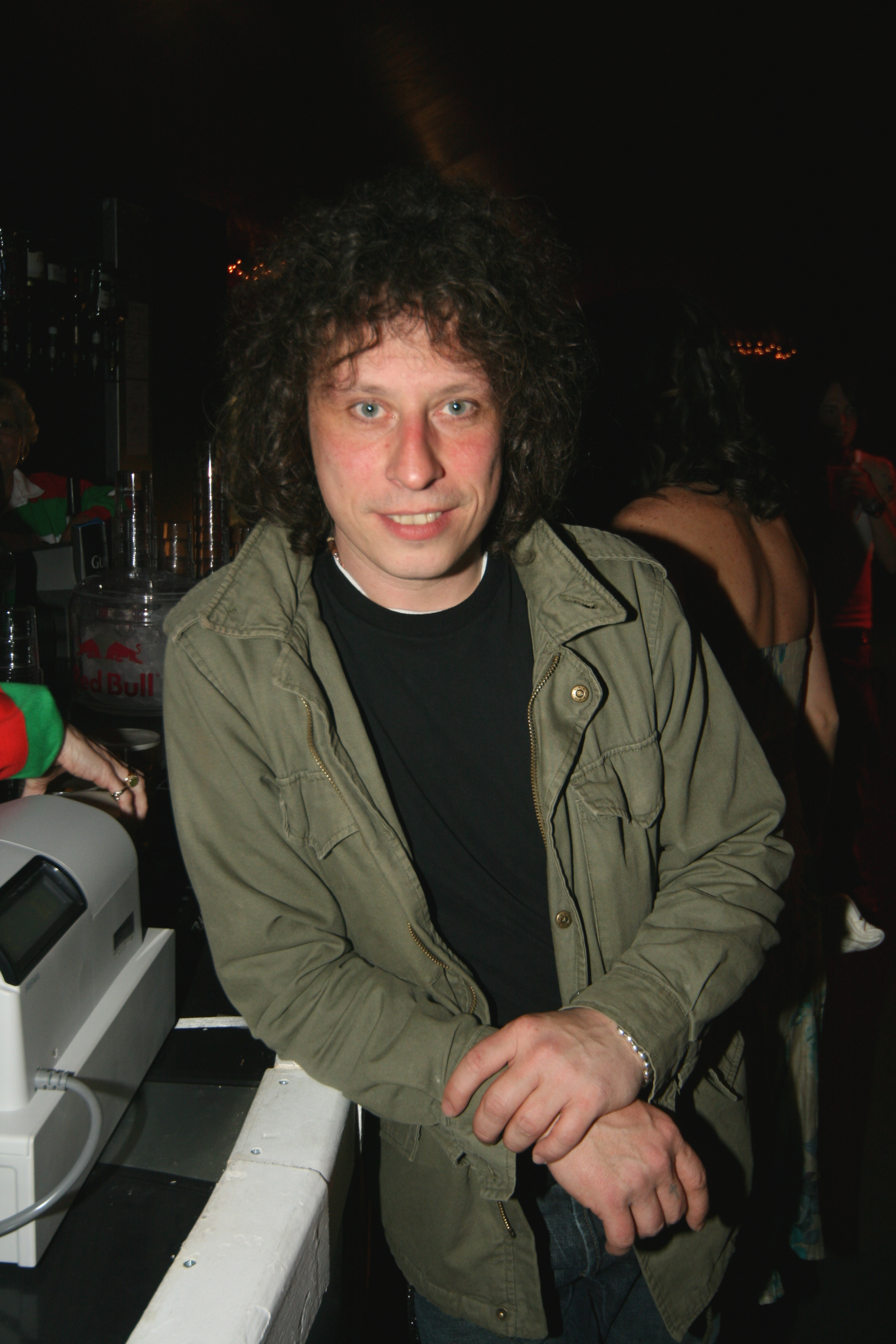
- Cable at the Red Dragon FM Welsh Awards in 2007

Background information
- Born: 19 May 1970; Aberdare, Wales
- Origin: Cwmaman, Wales
- Died: 7 June 2010 (aged 40) Llwydcoed, Wales
- Genres: Alternative rock; britpop; grunge
- Occupation: Musician
- Instruments: Drums, Vocals
- Years active: 1992–2010
- Label: Stylus Records
- Formerly of: Nailbombs; Stereophonics; Stone Gods; Killing for Company

Stuart James Cable (19 May 1970 – 7 June 2010) was a Welsh rock drummer and broadcaster, best known as the original drummer for the band Stereophonics.

== Early life ==
Cable was born in Aberdare, Rhondda Cynon Taf, on 19 May 1970. When he was 10, his father died. Thereafter, Cable and his elder brother, Paul, were raised by their mother Mabel (1930–2018) on her own. Cable grew up in the close-knit village of Cwmaman near Aberdare, He attended Blaengwawr Comprehensive School with his friend, Stereophonics singer-songwriter and guitarist Kelly Jones, who also lived on the same street.

== Career ==
=== Stereophonics ===
Together with Kelly Jones' school friend Richard Jones (no relation), the trio began playing covers in working men's clubs from 1992, under the name Tragic Love Company. The band later changed their name to Stereophonics in 1996. He also played a number of notable gigs in his native Wales. Of particular note were the concert of 12 June 1998 at Cardiff Castle and the concert of 31 July 1999 at the Morfa Stadium in Swansea, the latter shortly before the stadium was demolished. Both concerts were filmed live and released on VHS and DVD.

=== Other bands ===
Cable also played for other bands, including as a vocalist for Rhondda band NailBombs. During 1992, they recorded the E.P. "Raw Sex for Breakfast" at Sound Space Studios in Cardiff, on which Cable sang lead vocals. After Cable fully committed to Stereophonics, he was replaced by ex-Rag Dolls frontman J.J.Cruz.

He had been the temporary drummer for hard rock band Stone Gods, which was formed by former members of The Darkness, filling in for Ed Graham during 2008 who had left the band for health reasons.

Cable also drummed in his new Welsh band, Killing for Company, who were the first band to play the new Liberty Stadium in Swansea, supporting The Who.

=== Media career ===
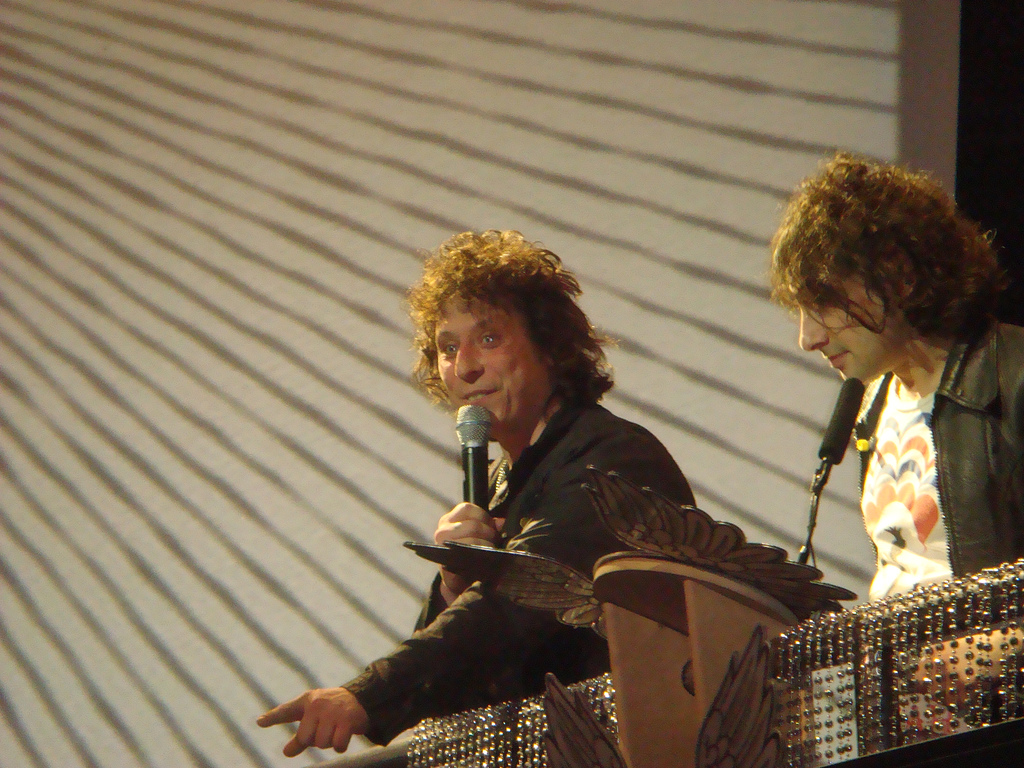
Cable with Alex Zane co-presenting the 2008 XFM Awards

In 2002, Cable was given his own TV chat show, Cable TV, by BBC Wales. He was sacked by Stereophonics in September 2003, because it was claimed he was spending too much time on his new media career at the expense of rehearsals. After that, he had another television series of his own, Cable Connects (2005) and had his own radio show on BBC Radio Wales: Cable Rock.

Cable was the spokesperson of a 2002 BBC Wales campaign (called BLLCKS) to raise awareness of testicular cancer.

In 2005, Cable co-hosted the Kerrang! Awards, and also presented two shows on Kerrang! 105.2: the Cable and Caroline Show with Caroline Beavon on Sunday mornings and The Rock 'n' Roll Years on weekday mornings until 2010. In November 2007, he joined XFM South Wales and hosted weekend shows until the station was sold on 30 May 2008. After leaving Kerrang! Radio, in April 2010 Cable returned to BBC Radio Wales as the presenter of Saturday Night Cable, a show playing both old and new rock music. Cable interviewed Slash from Guns N' Roses as a presenter and was scheduled to interview his favourite band, AC/DC, on the weekend following his death, at the Download Festival (where his new band were also scheduled to play).

== Personal life ==
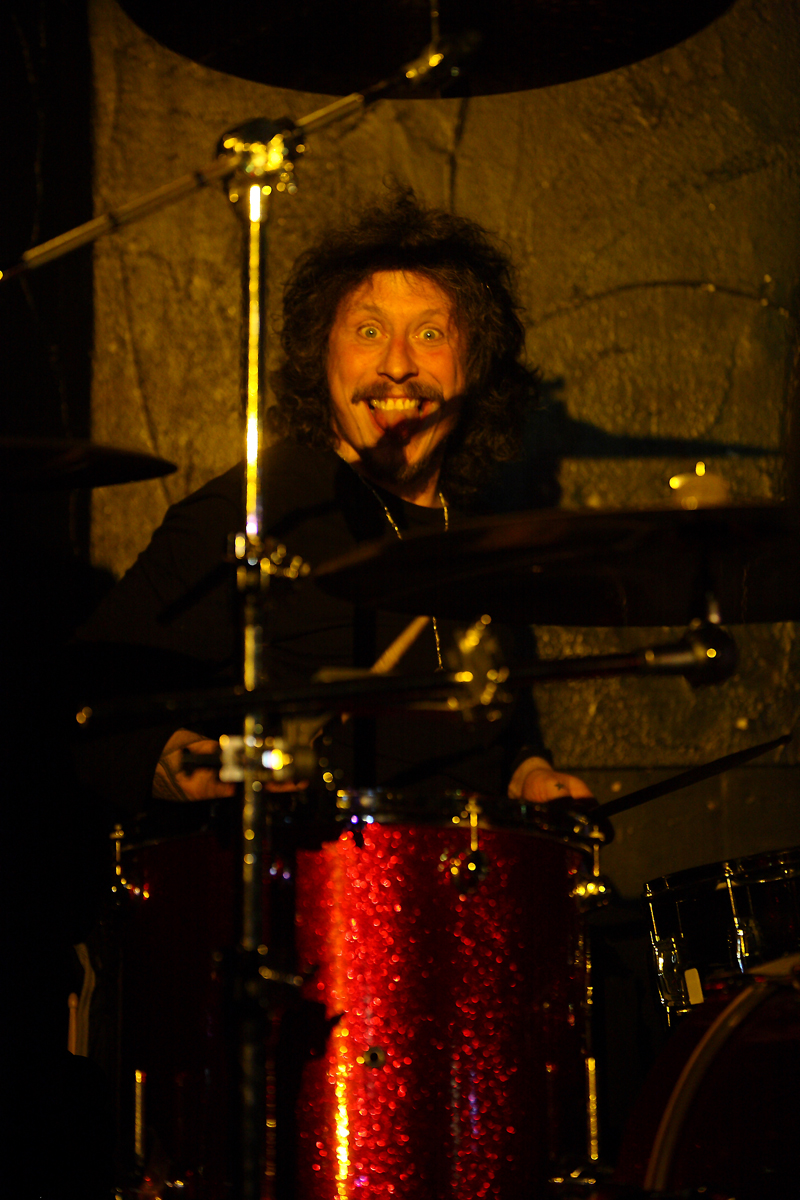
Cable live with Killing for Company in May 2010, several weeks before his death

Cable owned a flat in Cardiff Bay, and partly lived in Abernant, before moving to the neighbouring village of Llwydcoed in a Tudor-style house. In 1999, he married Nicola in Bridgend. Their son, Cian Damen, was born in 2001 in Cardiff. In 2003, he had an affair with television presenter Lisa Rogers. Cable claims that it was differences between Rogers and Kelly Jones' partner at the time which violently came to a head publicly at a restaurant in Paris, eventually leading to his dismissal after he made a sarcastic joke about the incident the following day. Around 2003, Cable and his wife divorced. In April 2009 he had spoken out about being sacked from Stereophonics and describes the moment they played in front of 80,000 people in Cardiff without him as "the darkest time of my entire life". He had said, "Until that point in my life, I had never ever considered something as stupid as suicide, but that night I could really understand why people get depressed enough to do it." He patched up his differences with Kelly Jones in 2009 and at the time of his death they were in contact again.

Cable released his autobiography in April 2009, entitled Demons and Cocktails – My Life with the Stereophonics. In his autobiography, he stated that he had been a hard drinker and drug user, particularly whisky and cocaine. He claimed his close friend, Dirty Sanchez star Mathew Pritchard, enjoyed wild parties and drugs. Like former Stereophonics bandmate Richard Jones, he was also a motorcycle enthusiast.

Cable was outspoken about child safety and backed a campaign named Stuart's Campaign, established following the death of Cowbridge schoolboy Stuart Cunningham-Jones, who died aboard a school bus. He had said, "In this day and age every child should have the right to travel to and from school in absolute safety."

== Death ==
Cable was found dead at his home in Llwydcoed at 5:30 am on 7 June 2010, aged 40. On the evening of 5 June, Stereophonics played in Cardiff; Cable was said to have been presenting on the radio at the same time that Stereophonics were performing. The following day, he began drinking at Welsh Harp Inn in Trecynon. Cable walked home with friends, where he continued drinking and choked to death on his own vomit during his sleep.

Cable's funeral was held at St Elvan's Church in Aberdare on 21 June 2010, with his former band mates in attendance. The mourners also included Rob Brydon, Rhys Ifans and some members of Dirty Sanchez. The cortege was led by a black horse-driven cabriolet. He was later cremated.
