= Stereophonics discography =

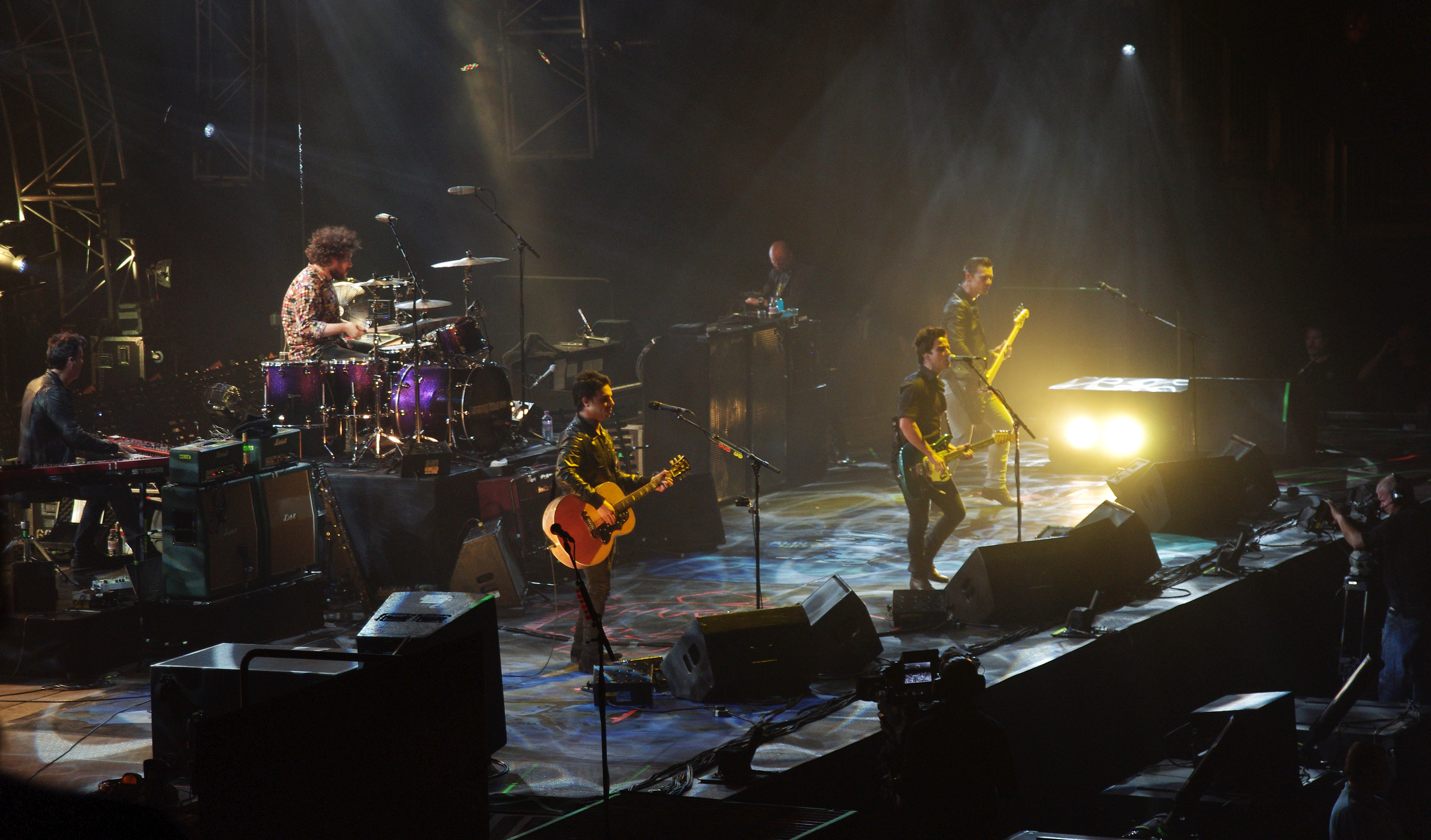
- The Stereophonics perform onstage at the O2 Arena in London in November 2013
- Studio albums: 13
- Extended plays: 4
- Live albums: 1
- Compilation albums: 1
- Singles: 49
- Video albums: 9
- Music videos: 40

Welsh rock band Stereophonics have released thirteen studio albums, one live album, one compilation album, four extended plays (EP), two box sets, forty-nine singles and thirty-nine music videos. In the UK, Stereophonics have been awarded six multi-platinum album certifications, one platinum and six gold; four of their singles has been awarded multi-platinum certification, seven gold and five silver. They have sold over 18 million copies worldwide, which includes 9,000,000 albums, (Note: UK combined album sales is based on BPI certifications as of April 2016 for: Word Gets Around, You Gotta Go There to Come Back, Graffiti on the Train, Keep the Village Alive, Decade in the Sun and Live from Dakota – these all equate to 3,200,000. Other studio album sales total 4,365,000.) 10,600,000 singles (Note: UK singles sales is based on BPI certifications only as of October 2026.) and 100,000 video albums, (Note: UK video album sales is based on BPI certifications only as of April 2016.) making them one of the most successful Welsh rock acts. The band released their first studio album, Word Gets Around in 1997 which reached number six in the UK Albums Chart. With the release of "The Bartender and the Thief" and its album Performance and Cocktails (1999), the band achieved mainstream success within the UK. The album was certified 6× platinum and is one of the band's best-selling albums.

In 2001 the group released their best-selling album Just Enough Education to Perform (2001) which was certified 6× platinum in the UK, having sold over 1,800,000 copies, and 2× platinum in Europe. It contains one of the band's signature songs "Have a Nice Day" which charted at number five in the UK. In 2003 the band released "Maybe Tomorrow", the second single from You Gotta Go There to Come Back (2003). It became one of Stereophonics' best charting singles in the UK, peaking at number three. "Dakota" was released in 2005 and brought Stereophonics their only UK number one single; its parent album Language. Sex. Violence. Other? (2005) became the band's fourth consecutive number-one album that same year. The single would also lend its name to their first live album a year later, Live from Dakota (2006). Pull the Pin (2007) also topped the UK charts to give them their fifth consecutive number one album, despite receiving mixed to negative reviews.

A greatest hits compilation was issued in late 2008, which was certified 6× platinum in the UK with over 1,800,000 copies sold. Keep Calm and Carry On (2009) was released one year later which became a commercial disappointment. After the Keep Calm and Carry On Tour concluded in 2010 the band took a break from releasing an album every two years, this resulted in their next studio album to be released in 2013. Graffiti on the Train (2013) brought back critical favor but failed to repeat the commercial success of their first few albums. It was also the first of two volumes, the second of which, Keep the Village Alive (2015), brought Stereophonics their first number-one album in eight years and their sixth overall.

== Albums ==
=== Studio albums ===
List of albums, with selected chart positions and certifications
Title	Album details	Peak chart positions										Sales	Certifications (sales thresholds)
Title	Album details	UK	AUS	BEL	FRA	GER	IRE	NLD	NZ	SWI	US	Sales	Certifications (sales thresholds)
Word Gets Around	Released: 25 August 1997; Label: V2; Formats: CD, LP	6	71	—	35	—	29	—	8	—	—	UK: 955,000	BPI: 3× Platinum
Performance and Cocktails	Released: 8 March 1999; Label: V2; Formats: CD, cassette	1	67	—	24	82	3	—	31	—	—	UK: 1,882,083	BPI: 6× Platinum
Just Enough Education to Perform	Released: 9 April 2001; Label: V2; Formats: CD, LP	1	38	16	25	35	1	43	21	29	188	UK: 1,822,101	BPI: 6× Platinum
You Gotta Go There to Come Back	Released: 2 June 2003; Label: V2; Formats: CD, LP	1	50	—	42	60	1	32	18	39	— (Note: You Gotta Go There to Come Back peaked at number forty-eight on the Heatseekers Albums chart.)	UK: 692,099	BPI: 2× Platinum
Language. Sex. Violence. Other?	Released: 14 March 2005; Label: V2; Formats: CD, LP	1	28	35	46	39	1	30	32	34	— (Note: Language. Sex. Violence. Other? peaked at number thirty-five on the Heatseekers Albums chart.)	UK: 500,000 (Note: United Kingdom sales figures as of March 2013.)	BPI: 2× Platinum; IRMA: Platinum
Pull the Pin	Released: 15 October 2007; Label: V2; Formats: CD, LP, DD	1	68	62	30	100	15	46	38	40	—	UK: 200,000	BPI: Gold; IRMA: Gold
Keep Calm and Carry On	Released: 16 November 2009; Label: V2/Mercury; Formats: CD, CD/DVD, LP	11	—	—	128	—	32	—	—	—	—	UK: 165,000	BPI: Gold
Graffiti on the Train	Released: 4 March 2013; Label: Stylus; Formats: CD, LP, DD	3	42	44	58	69	13	51	—	—	—	UK: 293,398 (Note: United Kingdom sales figures as of February 2017.)	BPI: Platinum
Keep the Village Alive	Released: 11 September 2015; Label: Stylus; Formats: CD, LP, DD	1	39	50	37	49	14	22	—	30	— (Note: Keep the Village Alive peaked at number seventeen on the Heatseekers Albums chart.)	UK: 194,559	BPI: Gold
Scream Above the Sounds	Released: 27 October 2017; Label: Stylus; Formats: CD, LP, DD	2	99	56	67	—	9	77	— (Note: Scream Above the Sounds did not enter the NZ Top 40 Albums Chart, but peaked at number six on the NZ Heatseeker Albums Chart.)	43	— (Note: Scream Above the Sounds peaked at number sixteen on the Heatseekers Albums chart.)		BPI: Gold
Kind	Released: 25 October 2019; Label: Stylus; Formats: CD, LP, DD	1	— (Note: Kind did not enter the ARIA Albums Chart, but peaked at number 26 on the ARIA Digital Album Chart.)	121	105	—	35	—	—	54	—		BPI: Gold
Oochya!	Released: 4 March 2022; Label: Stylus; Formats: CD, LP, DD	1	—	153	138	49	31	—	—	22	—		BPI: Silver
Make 'Em Laugh, Make 'Em Cry, Make 'Em Wait	Released: 25 April 2025; Label: EMI; Formats: CD, LP, DD	1	—	—	—	—	24	—	—	40	—		
"—" denotes releases that did not chart.

=== Live albums ===
List of albums, with selected chart positions and certifications
Title	Album details	Peak chart positions				Certifications (sales thresholds)
Title	Album details	UK	BEL	FRA	IRE	Certifications (sales thresholds)
Live from Dakota	Released: 3 April 2006; Label: V2; Formats: CD, LP, DD	13	98	166	22	BPI: Gold

=== Compilation albums ===
List of albums, with selected chart positions and certifications
Title	Album details	Peak chart positions			Certifications (sales thresholds)
Title	Album details	UK	BEL	IRE	Certifications (sales thresholds)
Decade in the Sun: Best of Stereophonics	Released: 10 November 2008; Label: V2; Formats: CD, DD	2	75	16	BPI: 6× Platinum; IRMA: Gold
Tune! Ultimate Collection 96–26	Released: 20 November 2026; Label: EMI; Formats: CD, LP, DD				

=== Box sets ===
List of albums
Title	Album details
Performance and Cocktails	Fan-only release; Released: 1999; Label: V2; Formats: LP
Just Enough Education to Perform – An Acoustic Preview	Fan-only release; Released: 2002; Label: V2; Formats: CD

== Extended plays ==
List of EPs
Title	Extended play details
Live from London EP	Released: 27 April 2005; Label: V2; Formats: LP, DD
Pull the Pin	Released: 18 February 2008; Label: V2; Formats: DD
Pass the Buck	Released: 14 March 2008; Label: V2; Formats: DD
Live from the Royal Albert Hall	Released: 11 September 2015; Label: Stylus; Formats: CD

== Singles ==
=== As lead artist ===
List of singles as lead artist, with selected chart positions and certifications, showing year released and album name
Title	Year	Peak chart positions										Certifications (sales thresholds)	Album
Title	Year	UK	AUS	BEL	IRE	NLD	NZ	SCO	SWE	UK Indie	US Alt.	Certifications (sales thresholds)	Album
"Local Boy in the Photograph"	1997	51	—	—	—	—	—	59	—	—	—	BPI: Gold	Word Gets Around
"More Life in a Tramps Vest"	1997	33	—	—	—	—	—	36	—	45	—		Word Gets Around
"A Thousand Trees"	1997	22	—	—	—	—	—	21	—	18	—	BPI: Gold	Word Gets Around
"Traffic"	1997	20	—	—	—	—	—	14	—	3	—	BPI: Silver	Word Gets Around
"Local Boy in the Photograph" (re-issue)	1998	14	—	—	28	—	—	10	—	2	—	BPI: Gold	Word Gets Around
"The Bartender and the Thief"	1998	3	—	—	30	—	—	3	—	1	—	BPI: Gold	Performance and Cocktails
"Just Looking"	1999	4	—	—	18	—	—	3	—	2	—	BPI: Gold	Performance and Cocktails
"Pick a Part That's New"	1999	4	—	—	17	—	—	3	—	2	—	BPI: Silver	Performance and Cocktails
"I Wouldn't Believe Your Radio"	1999	11	—	—	—	—	—	7	—	2	—	BPI: Silver	Performance and Cocktails
"Hurry Up and Wait"	1999	11	—	—	23	—	—	8	—	1	—		Performance and Cocktails
"Mr. Writer"	2001	5	—	—	7	96	—	3	53	1	—	BPI: Gold	Just Enough Education to Perform
"Have a Nice Day"	2001	5	73	—	11	84	37	2	—	1	— (Note: "Have a Nice Day" peaked at number twenty-one on the Adult Top 40 chart.)	BPI: 2× Platinum	Just Enough Education to Perform
"Step on My Old Size Nines"	2001	16	—	—	26	—	—	13	—	4	—		Just Enough Education to Perform
"Handbags and Gladrags"	2001	4	—	59	3	57	—	3	—	1	—	BPI: 2× Platinum	Just Enough Education to Perform
"Vegas Two Times"	2002	23	—	—	39	—	—	20	—	2	—		Just Enough Education to Perform
"Madame Helga"	2003	4	—	—	15	—	—	3	—	3	—		You Gotta Go There to Come Back
"Maybe Tomorrow"	2003	3	—	—	18	32	—	3	—	1	—	BPI: 2× Platinum; RMNZ: Platinum	You Gotta Go There to Come Back
"Since I Told You It's Over"	2003	16	—	—	—	50	—	12	—	1	—		You Gotta Go There to Come Back
"Moviestar"	2004	5	—	—	26	85	—	6	—	1	—		You Gotta Go There to Come Back
"Dakota"	2005	1	22	68	8	74	20	1	—	1	34	BPI: 5× Platinum; RMNZ: 2× Platinum	Language. Sex. Violence. Other?
"Superman"	2005	13	—	—	19	—	—	—	—	2	—		Language. Sex. Violence. Other?
"Devil"	2005	11	—	—	—	—	—	14	—	3	—		Language. Sex. Violence. Other?
"Rewind"	2005	17	—	—	—	—	—	16	—	1	—		Language. Sex. Violence. Other?
"It Means Nothing"	2007	12	—	73	—	—	—	5	—	—	—		Pull the Pin
"My Friends"	2007	32	—	—	—	—	—	14	—	—	—		Pull the Pin
"You're My Star"	2008	170	—	—	—	—	—	—	—	—	—		Decade in the Sun: Best of Stereophonics
"Innocent"	2009	54	—	30	—	—	—	29	—	—	—		Keep Calm and Carry On
"Could You Be the One?"	2010	—	—	—	—	—	—	—	—	—	—		Keep Calm and Carry On
"Indian Summer"	2013	30	—	79	33	—	—	15	—	5	—	BPI: Gold	Graffiti on the Train
"Graffiti on the Train"	2013	44	—	—	—	—	—	46	—	7	—		Graffiti on the Train
"We Share the Same Sun"	2013	—	—	—	—	—	—	—	—	28	—		Graffiti on the Train
"C'est la Vie"	2015	73	—	—	—	—	—	30	—	3	—	BPI: Gold	Keep the Village Alive
"I Wanna Get Lost with You"	2015	78	—	—	—	—	—	25	—	7	—	BPI: Gold	Keep the Village Alive
"Song for the Summer"	2015	—	—	89	—	—	—	—	—	38	—		Keep the Village Alive
"White Lies"	2016	—	—	—	—	—	—	63	—	17	—		Keep the Village Alive
"Mr and Mrs Smith"	2016	—	—	—	—	—	—	—	—	—	—		Keep the Village Alive
"All in One Night"	2017	—	—	—	—	—	—	40	—	—	—		Scream Above the Sounds
"Caught by the Wind"	2017	—	—	—	—	—	—	29	—	—	—		Scream Above the Sounds
"Chaos from the Top Down"	2019	—	—	—	—	—	—	91	—	—	—		Non-album single
"Fly Like an Eagle"	2019	—	—	—	—	—	—	41	—	—	—		Kind
"Bust This Town"	2019	—	—	—	—	—	—	49	—	—	—		Kind
"Don't Let the Devil Take Another Day"	2019	—	—	—	—	—	—	—	—	—	—		Kind
"Hungover for You"	2020	—	—	—	—	—	—	—	—	—	—		Kind
"Hanging on Your Hinges"	2021	—	—	—	—	—	—	—	—	—	—		Oochya!
"Do Ya Feel My Love?"	2021	—	—	—	—	—	—	—	—	—	—		Oochya!
"Forever"	2022	—	—	—	—	—	—	—	—	—	—		Oochya!
"Right Place, Right Time"	2022	—	—	—	—	—	—	—	—	—	—		Oochya!
"There's Always Gonna Be Something"	2025	—	—	—	—	—	—	—	—	—	—		Make 'Em Laugh, Make 'Em Cry, Make 'Em Wait
"Seems Like You Don't Know Me"	2025	—	—	—	—	—	—	—	—	—	—		Make 'Em Laugh, Make 'Em Cry, Make 'Em Wait
"—" denotes releases that did not chart.

=== As featured artist ===
List of singles as featured artist, with selected chart positions, showing year released and album name
Title	Year	Peak chart positions						Certifications (sales thresholds)	Album
Title	Year	UK	AUS	IRE	NLD	NZ	SWI	Certifications (sales thresholds)	Album
"Mama Told Me Not to Come" (Tom Jones and Stereophonics)	2000	4	141	11	77	45	51	BPI: Silver	Reload

=== Promotional singles ===
List of promotional singles, showing year released and album name
Title	Year	Album
"Looks Like Chaplin" (Note: "Looks Like Chaplin" was a limited edition release.)	1996	Word Gets Around
"T-shirt Sun Tan" (Note: "T-shirt Sun Tan" was also a limited edition release.)	1999	Performance and Cocktails
"Lying in the Sun" (Note: "Lying in the Sun" was released only to the band's fan club.)	2003	Just Enough Education to Perform
"Bank Holiday Monday"	2007	Pull the Pin
"Pass the Buck"	2008	Pull the Pin
"In a Moment" (Note: "In a Moment" was released as a free download.)	2012	Graffiti on the Train

== Other charted songs ==
List of songs, with selected chart positions, showing year released and album name
Title	Year	Peak chart positions	Album
Title	Year	UK Indie	Album
"Violins and Tambourines"	2013	27	Graffiti on the Train

== Video albums ==
List of albums, with selected chart positions and certifications
Title	Year	Peak chart positions	Note(s)	Certifications (sales thresholds)
Title	Year	UK Music Video Chart	Note(s)	Certifications (sales thresholds)
Live at Cardiff Castle	1998	8	Concert film	BPI: Gold
Performance and Cocktails: Live at Morfa Stadium	1999	7	Concert film	BPI: Platinum
Call Us What You Want But Don't Call Us in the Morning	2000	3	Video compilation	
A Day at the Races	2002	3	Concert film	BPI: Gold
You Gotta Go There to Come Back DVD Collection	2003	—	Video compilation	
The Stereophonics Collection	2005	12	Box set	BPI: Gold
Language. Sex. Violence. Other?	2006	2	Rockumentary	
Rewind	2007	1	Rockumentary, video compilation	
Decade in the Sun: Best of Stereophonics	2008	—	Video compilation	
Live in Glasgow	2013	—	Concert film	

== Music videos ==
=== As lead artist ===
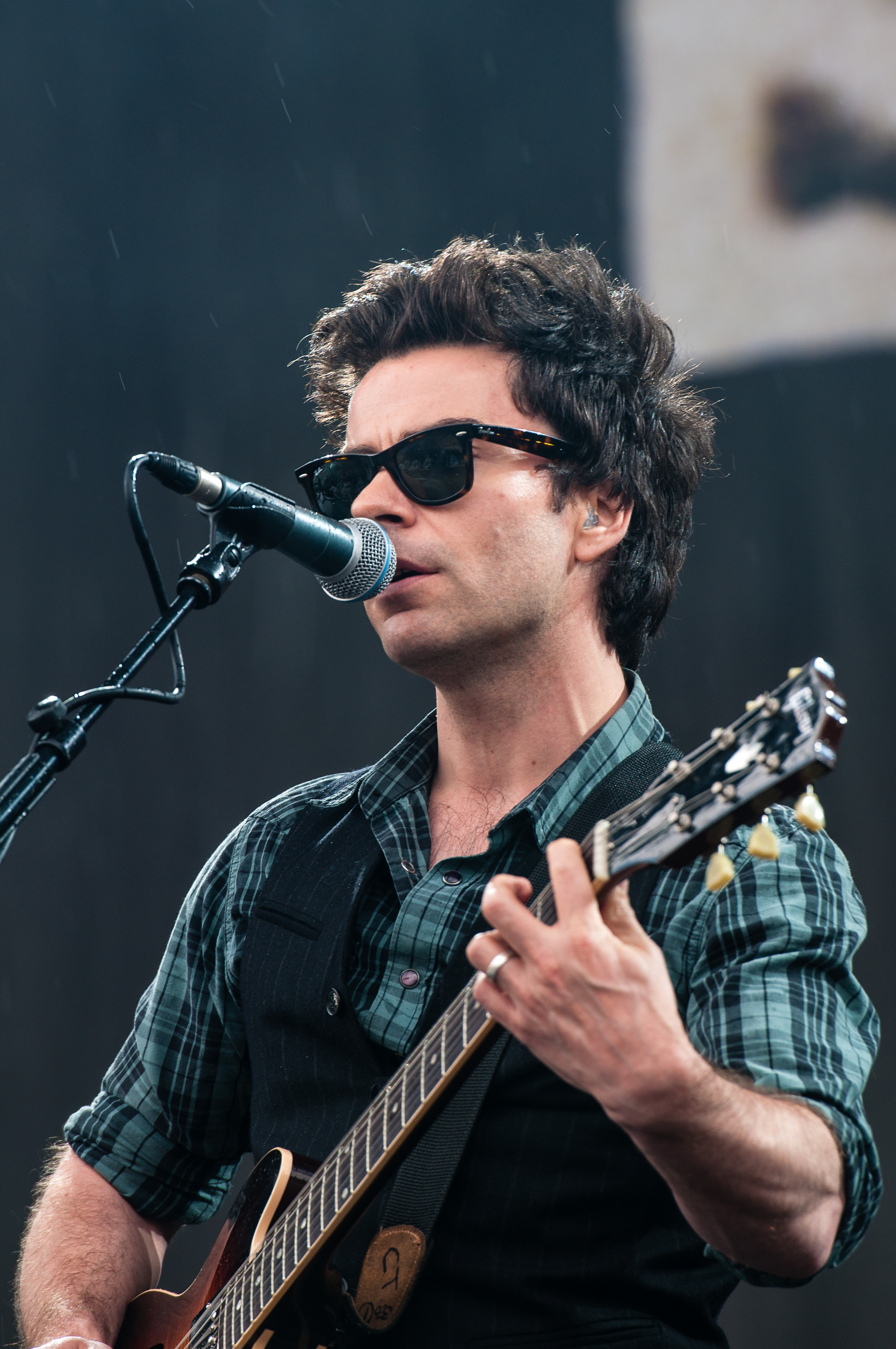
Lead singer and guitarist Kelly Jones has been directing the music videos since "Violins and Tambourines" (2012).

Title	Year	Director	Album
"Not Up to You" (promo)	1997	Kelly Jones	Word Gets Around
"More Life in a Tramps Vest"	1997	Mark Nunneley	Word Gets Around
"A Thousand Trees"	1997	Tom Connoly	Word Gets Around
"Traffic"	1997	Pinko	Word Gets Around
"Local Boy in the Photograph"	1997	Pinko and Duncan Telford	Word Gets Around
"The Bartender and the Thief"	1999	Pinko	Performance and Cocktails
"Just Looking"	1999	Pinko	Performance and Cocktails
"Pick a Part That's New"	1999	Pinko	Performance and Cocktails
"I Wouldn't Believe Your Radio"	1999	Pinko	Performance and Cocktails
"Hurry Up and Wait"	1999	Pinko	Performance and Cocktails
"Mr. Writer"	2001	David Slade	Just Enough Education to Perform
"Have a Nice Day"	2001	Jake & Jim	Just Enough Education to Perform
"Step on My Old Size Nines"	2001	Peter Bonnetti	Just Enough Education to Perform
"Handbags and Gladrags" (with Jools Holland and his Rhythm & Blues orchestra)	2001	Ben Unwin	Just Enough Education to Perform
"Vegas Two Times"	2002	Ben Unwin	Just Enough Education to Perform
"Madame Helga"	2003	Robert Hales	You Gotta Go There to Come Back
"Maybe Tomorrow"	2003	Wiz	You Gotta Go There to Come Back
"Since I Told You It's Over"	2003	Ben Unwin	You Gotta Go There to Come Back
"Moviestar"	2004	Alex and Martin	You Gotta Go There to Come Back
"Dakota"	2005	Charles Mehling	Language. Sex. Violence. Other?
"Superman"	2005	Charles Mehling	Language. Sex. Violence. Other?
"Devil"	2005	Charles Mehling	Language. Sex. Violence. Other?
"Rewind"	2005	Charles Mehling	Language. Sex. Violence. Other?
"It Means Nothing"	2007	Charles Mehling	Pull the Pin
"My Friends" (promo)	2007	Charles Mehling	Pull the Pin
"You're My Star"	2008	Luc Janin	Decade in the Sun: Best of Stereophonics
"Innocent"	2009		Keep Calm and Carry On
"Could You Be the One?"	2010		Keep Calm and Carry On
"Violins and Tambourines"	2012	Kelly Jones	Graffiti on the Train
"In a Moment"	2012	Kelly Jones	Graffiti on the Train
"Indian Summer"	2013	Kelly Jones	Graffiti on the Train
"Graffiti on the Train"	2013	Kelly Jones	Graffiti on the Train
"We Share the Same Sun"	2013	Kelly Jones	Graffiti on the Train
"C'est la Vie"	2015	Kelly Jones	Keep the Village Alive
"I Wanna Get Lost With You"	2015	Kelly Jones	Keep the Village Alive
"Song for the Summer"	2015	Kelly Jones	Keep the Village Alive
"White Lies"	2016	Kelly Jones	Keep the Village Alive
"Mr and Mrs Smith"	2016	Kelly Jones	Keep the Village Alive
"All in One Night"	2017	Joseph Connor	Scream Above the Sounds
"Caught by the Wind"	2017	Joseph Connor	Scream Above the Sounds
"What's All the Fuss About?"	2017	Joseph Connor	Scream Above the Sounds
"Taken a Tumble"	2018	Joseph Connor	Scream Above the Sounds
"Would You Believe?"	2018	Joseph Connor	Scream Above the Sounds
"Fly Like An Eagle"	2019	Charlotte Regan	Kind
"Bust This Town"	2019	Kes Glozier	Kind
"Do Ya Feel My Love?"	2021	Maxim Kelly	Oochya!
"Forever"	2022	NAVS	Oochya!
"Right Place, Right Time"	2022		Oochya!
