= We Share the Same Sun =

Single by Stereophonics

from the album Graffiti on the Train
- Released: 12 August 2013
- Recorded: 2012–2013
- Genre: Alternative rock
- Length: 3:44
- Label: Stylus; Ignition
- Songwriter: Kelly Jones
- Producers: Kelly Jones; Jim Lowe

Stereophonics singles chronology
"Graffiti on the Train" (2013)	"We Share the Same Sun" (2013)	"C'est la Vie" (2015)

Music video
- "We Share the Same Sun" on YouTube

"We Share the Same Sun" is a song by rock band Stereophonics. It is the opening track on their 2013 album Graffiti on the Train and was released as the album's fourth single on 12 August 2013. The song was released as a 10" vinyl format and Stereophonics have regularly played it as part of their set list. When Graffiti on the Train was released the song had a mixed to positive response and has been compared to "Landslide" by Fleetwood Mac.

== Composition ==
"We Share the Same Sun" is played at a tempo of 128 beats per minute. The song runs for 3:44 on both the album and single. It begins with an acoustic guitar playing E♭-D-Gm-F for fifteen seconds until lead singer Kelly Jones begins his vocals. When the chorus enters, electric guitars are abruptly introduced, along with bass and drums provided by Richard Jones and Javier Weyler, respectively. The second and last chorus is extended which includes Adam Zindani singing to harmonise with Jones. The bridge section has Zindani echoing Jones' vocals, this is then followed by a guitar solo from Zindani.

The guitar in the song was described as "bluesy" by Matthew Horton from the BBC.

== Promotion and release ==
"We Share the Same Sun" was regularly played on BBC Radio 2, particularly on The Chris Evans Breakfast Show, two weeks before its release. Jones performed a solo version and this was included on the bonus disc of Graffiti on the Train as "We Share the Same Sun (up close)". On the iTunes deluxe edition, a video of Stereophonics in the studio – titled "We Share the Same Sun (In the Studio)" – was included which features shots of the studio, Stereophonics performing and fellow producer Jim Lowe at a mixing console. This was filmed when former drummer Javier Weyler was still in the band.

=== Formats ===
Promotional CDs were made available on 1 July 2013 which featured the song as well as the instrumental version. The limited 10" vinyl edition was available to pre-order on the band's website and was released on 12 August 2013 with lyrics etched on Side B. The cover art for the single was created by Steve Goddard who created the artwork for Graffiti on the Train.

=== Release history ===
Region	Date	Format	Label
United Kingdom	1 July 2013	Promo CD	Stylus Records (Note: Stylus Records is under exclusive license to Ignition Records Ltd. This is stated on Ignition Records' website and the credits on the back of the "We Share the Same Sun" vinyl.)
United Kingdom	12 August 2013	10" vinyl	Stylus Records

=== Music video ===
Bassist Richard Jones performing while an image projector creates a lens flare.

The music video for "We Share the Same Sun" was directed by Jones. It features the band in a low-lit room performing while an image projector displays various multicoloured patterns on them and the wall behind them. There are also shots of the projector behind individual band members as they play, creating lens flares. Although Jamie Morrison is seen playing the drums in the video it was Javier Weyler who provided the drums on the track.

== Live performances ==
In March 2013, Stereophonics held a March Tour to support Graffiti on the Train and "We Share the Same Sun" was played at all the shows. The band were booked for several summer festivals in 2013, including Pinkpop Festival (16 June), T in the Park (14 July) and the V Festival (18 August), where they performed the song. When performing at Radio 2 in Concert, the song was the first of 6 songs to be played from the album.

== Critical response ==
Initial reviews of "We Share the Same Sun" have been mixed to positive. When reviewing Graffiti on the Train, Drowned in Sound contributor Sean Adams gave the song a positive review, calling it one of the stand-out tracks on the record. He compared the beginning of the track to "Landslide" by Fleetwood Mac. Eric Allen from American Songwriter called the song "moody" but stated, "it becomes glaringly obvious the band has regrouped and rediscovered their passion for making records."

Matthew Horton at the BBC had a less enthusiastic response, describing it as "turning a bluesy guitar over and over against sinister keys – no quick rewards here." At NME, Tom Howard had a negative response writing, "By slowly fading into the background of pop culture, the Stereophonics have created some space to pump out the same old stuff for their fans. So on 'We Share The Same Sun' Kelly Jones is gruff and there’s a big chorus, and the faithful will lap it up like hairy dogs with bowls of ice-cold water in hot weather."

== Appearances in other media ==
The song has been used by Sky Sports F1 in the background of their coverage of race weekends. A clip of the song was played on Channel 4's Sunday Brunch programme.

== Track listings ==
All tracks are written by Kelly Jones

Promo CD
No.	Title	Length
1.	"We Share the Same Sun"	3:46
2.	"We Share the Same Sun" (Instrumental)	3:44
Total length:		7:30

10" vinyl
No.	Title	Length
1.	"We Share the Same Sun"	3:44

== Personnel ==
Stereophonics

- Kelly Jones – lead vocals, guitar
- Richard Jones – bass guitar
- Adam Zindani – guitar, backing vocals
- Javier Weyler – drums

Additional

- Jim Lowe – keyboards, programming

Technical

- Production, Mixing – Kelly Jones, Jime Lowe
- Engineering – Lowe
- Mastering – Dick Beetham

== Charts ==
Chart (2013)	Peak position
UK Indie (Official Charts)	28
