= Scream Above the Sounds =

Studio album by Stereophonics
- Released: 27 October 2017
- Recorded: March 2015–December 2016
- Studios: Stylus Studios (London); RAK Studios
- Genre: Rock
- Length: 46:29
- Labels: Stylus; Parlophone
- Producers: Kelly Jones; Jim Lowe

Stereophonics chronology
| Keep the Village Alive (2015) | Scream Above the Sounds (2017) | Kind (2019) |

Singles from Scream Above the Sounds
- 1. "All in One Night" Released: 27 July 2017; 2. "Caught by the Wind" Released: 4 September 2017; 3. "Before Anyone Knew Our Name" Released: 20 October 2017; 4. "What's All the Fuss About?" Released: April 2018; 5. "Taken a Tumble" Released: June 2018

Scream Above the Sounds is the tenth studio album by Welsh rock band Stereophonics. Released on 27 October 2017 by Parlophone Records, it was produced by lead singer and guitarist Kelly Jones, along with Jim Lowe.

== Background ==
In 2015, Stereophonics released their ninth studio album, Keep the Village Alive, and supported it with the Keep the Summer Alive Tour throughout late-spring and summer 2016. During the tour, Kelly Jones announced he would like to release the band's tenth studio album "before next summer" to commemorate the 20th anniversary of Word Gets Around, rather than release a compilation album. In February 2017, the band signed with Parlophone Records to release Scream Above The Sounds, having been on their own Stylus Records label for Graffiti on the Train and Keep the Village Alive.

On 27 July, Stereophonics revealed the name, release date and album artwork for Scream Above the Sounds, as well as releasing the lead single "All in One Night". The single was accompanied by a video directed by Joseph Connor. "All in One Night" was inspired by Victoria and was written when the band were touring in Shanghai with Jones in a hotel due to a delayed flight. "I was in this hotel and it was basically an idea I had after watching this German film called ‘Victoria’, which is about this girl who goes into a nightclub and ends up hooking up with these three guys," Jones continued "I thought the idea of two people meeting and their life completely changing over the course of one night was quite an interesting idea."

The next single was "Caught by the Wind", which was released on 4 September 2017 along with a music video. On 20 October the band released the song "Before Anyone Knew Our Name" through their YouTube channel, and on 24 October they performed "Taken a Tumble" on Later... with Jools Holland.

=== Title and artwork ===
"The title comes from my feeling that we’re constantly being bombarded with information, at the moment it’s mainly bad news, but you can’t get away from it. You need to be able to separate yourself from all that, to decompress, I think too much people are over-reliant on it.”

— Kelly Jones

The cover art was designed by Graham Rounthwaite, who also designed the artwork to the band's fifth studio album Language. Sex. Violence. Other?

The title of the album was taken from a line in the single 'All In One Night'. Kelly Jones said the title of the album didn't come easy. "It’s always the last thing. Scream Above The Sounds came to me one night, we were mixing the album and the line jumped out at me."

== Release ==
The album was released on 27 October 2017 on CD, vinyl and digital download formats, with the downloaded edition including a digital booklet. A deluxe edition was released at the same time with five bonus tracks. Two unplugged versions of previously released songs from the album – "Caught By The Wind" and "All In One Night" and three previously unreleased songs – "Never Going Down", "Drive a Thousand Miles" and "Breaking Dawn". The sticker on the deluxe CD mistakenly lists the tracks "What's All the Fuss About?" and "Would You Believe?" as singles, despite the fact that they had not been released previously.

== Reception ==
=== Critical response ===
Professional ratings
Aggregate scores
| Source | Rating |
|---|---|
| AnyDecentMusic? | 5.0/10 |
| Metacritic | 57/100 |
Review scores
| Source | Rating |
| Classic Rock | 3.5/5 stars |
| Clash | 7/10 |
| Evening Standard | 3/5 stars |
| The Independent | 3/5 stars |
| The Irish Times | 2/5 stars |
| Islington Gazette | 2/5 stars |
| laut.de | 3/5 stars |
| Mojo | 2/5 stars |
| Q | 3/5 stars |
| The Times | 3/5 stars |

Scream Above the Sounds has received generally mixed reviews. At Metacritic, which assigns a weighted average rating out of 100 to reviews from mainstream critics, the album received an average score of 57 based on five reviews. John Aizlewood of Classic Rock praised the album saying "By any yardstick, this album is good work."

=== Commercial performance ===
On 3 November 2017, the album reached number two on the UK Albums Chart, debuting behind Together Again by Michael Ball and Alfie Boe, which sold 35 more copies. On 29 December 2017 the album was certified Gold in the UK for sales of 100,000.

== Track listing ==
All tracks written by Kelly Jones; "Taken a Tumble" music co-written by Adam Zindani.

| No. | Title | Length |
|---|---|---|
| 1. | "Caught by the Wind" | 3:37 |
| 2. | "Taken a Tumble" | 3:36 |
| 3. | "What's All the Fuss About?" | 5:44 |
| 4. | "Geronimo" | 4:15 |
| 5. | "All in One Night" | 5:17 |
| 6. | "Chances Are" | 4:45 |
| 7. | "Before Anyone Knew Our Name" | 4:43 |
| 8. | "Would You Believe?" | 4:07 |
| 9. | "Cryin' in Your Beer" | 3:48 |
| 10. | "Boy on a Bike" | 2:17 |
| 11. | "Elevators" | 4:20 |
| Total length: | | 46:29 |

Scream Above the Sounds – Deluxe edition (bonus tracks)
| No. | Title | Length |
|---|---|---|
| 12. | "Never Going Down" (Live at RAK Studios) | 4:05 |
| 13. | "Drive a Thousand Miles" (Graffiti sessions) | 4:31 |
| 14. | "Breaking Dawn" (Written For Twilight) | 3:29 |
| 15. | "All in One Night" (Unplugged) | 5:29 |
| 16. | "Caught by the Wind" (Unplugged) | 3:41 |

== Personnel ==
Stereophonics

- Kelly Jones – lead vocals, guitar, piano, vocal beatbox, glockenspiel, production, mixing (tracks 1–7, 9–14)
- Richard Jones – bass guitar
- Adam Zindani – guitar, backing vocals
- Jamie Morrison – drums, percussion

Technical

- Craig Silvey – mixing (track 8)
- Duncan Fuller – recording studio assistant at RAK Studios
- Nathanael Graham – mixing studio assistant at RAK Studios
- Dick Beetham – mastering

Additional

- Jim Lowe – keyboards (tracks 1–6, 8, 9), piano (tracks 3–6, 8, 12), Hammond (track 8), programming (tracks 1–6, 7–9, 11–16), synthesizer (track 14), production, mixing (tracks 1–7, 9–16), engineering
- Jim Abbiss – programming (track 14), synthesizer (track 14), production (track 14)
- Sam Yapp – drums (track 9)
- Tony Kirkham – piano (tracks 2, 11), add. piano (track 3), Hammond (track 9), keyboards (tracks 15, 16)
- Gavin Fitzjohn – trumpet (track 3), flugelhorn (track 3), baritone saxophone (track 4)
- Mikey Rowe – Harmonium (track 11)
- Dieter Limbourg – alto saxophone (track 9)
- UK Gospel Choir – tracks 1, 3, 4, 8, 9
- Javier Weyler – drums (track 13)

== Charts ==
=== Weekly charts ===
| Chart (2017) | Peak position |
|---|---|
| Australian Albums (ARIA) | 99 |
| Belgian Albums (Ultratop Flanders) | 56 |
| Belgian Albums (Ultratop Wallonia) | 63 |
| Dutch Albums (Album Top 100) | 77 |
| French Albums (SNEP) | 67 |
| Irish Albums (IRMA) | 9 |
| New Zealand Heatseeker Albums (RMNZ) | 6 |
| Scottish Albums (Official Charts) | 1 |
| Spanish Albums (Promusicae) | 60 |
| Swiss Albums (Schweizer Hitparade) | 43 |
| UK Albums (Official Charts) | 2 |

=== Year-end charts ===
| Chart (2017) | Position |
|---|---|
| UK Albums (OCC) | 62 |

== Certifications ==
| Region | Certification | Certified units/sales |
|---|---|---|
| United Kingdom (BPI) | Gold | 100,000^{‡} |
^{‡} Sales+streaming figures based on certification alone.
