= Graffiti on the Train Tour =

2012–13 concert tour by Stereophonics

- World tour by Stereophonics
- UK Arena Tour poster
- Location: Europe; Japan; Australia; North America
- Associated album: Graffiti on the Train
- Start date: 15 December 2012
- End date: 28 November 2013
- Legs: 6
- No. of shows: 60

Stereophonics concert chronology
- Keep Calm and Carry On Tour (2009–2010); Graffiti on the Train Tour (2012–2013); Keep the Summer Alive Tour (2015–2016)

The Graffiti on the Train Tour was a worldwide concert tour by rock band Stereophonics. The band have played at festivals as well as their own shows while on the tour. It was the band's first tour without drummer Javier Weyler, who was replaced by Jamie Morrison. The tour started in Newport, Wales on 15 December 2012 and is set to end in London, England on 28 November 2013. During their leg in Japan, lead singer Kelly Jones twisted his ankle after a night out with Morrison. With their flight due to leave within a few hours and Jones unable to walk, bassist Richard Jones had to transport the singer across the airport in a luggage trolley. For the next gigs, Jones had to wear a leg strap which restricted his movement on stage. Later on while on the Australian leg, he also suffered from a respiratory tract infection which forced the band to cancel their show in Melbourne on 23 July, Stereophonics' first cancellation in 17 years. Before their American leg of the tour, a competition was held by Creative Allies for people to design a poster for the leg. The winner, Yiotu, won $500 and a Stereophonics prize pack. During the last leg of the tour, The Wind and The Wave supported the band from 7–16 November. For the remaining dates, Kitty, Daisy & Lewis were the band.

== Set list ==
This set list is representative of the performance on 20 September 2013. It does not represent all concerts for the duration of the tour.

1. Catacomb
2. Local Boy in the Photograph
3. Superman
4. Graffiti on the Train
5. We Share the Same Sun
6. Indian Summer
7. Have a Nice Day
8. Vegas Two Times
9. Mr. Writer
10. Nothing Precious at All
11. Maybe Tomorrow
12. The Bartender and the Thief
13. Roll the Dice
14. Violins and Tambourines
15. Been Caught Cheating
16. Beerbottle
17. Could You Be the One?
18. In a Moment

Encore

1. Billy Davey's Daughter
2. Just Looking
3. A Thousand Trees
4. Dakota

== Tour dates ==
Date	City	Country	Venue
Leg 1: United Kingdom
15 December 2012	Newport	Wales	Newport Centre
16 December 2012	Manchester	England	Manchester Academy
17 December 2012	Glasgow	Scotland	O2 Academy Glasgow
19 December 2012	Birmingham	England	O2 Academy Birmingham
20 December 2012	London	England	Troxy
Leg 2: Europe
4 March 2013	London	England	Electric Brixton
7 March 2013	Belfast	Northern Ireland	Waterfront Hall
9 March 2013	Dublin	Ireland	Olympia Theatre
12 March 2013	Berlin	Germany	Kesselhaus
13 March 2013	Paris	France	Bataclan
15 March 2013	Leicester	England	De Montfort Hall
16 March 2013	Wolverhampton	England	Wolverhampton Civic Hall
18 March 2013	Leeds	England	Leeds Academy
19 March 2013	Southend-on-Sea	England	Cliffs Pavilion
21 March 2013	Cheltenham	England	Centaur
22 March 2013	Portsmouth	England	Portsmouth Guildhall
23 March 2013	Plymouth	England	Plymouth Pavilions
25 March 2013	Doncaster	England	The Dome
26 March 2013	Blackpool	England	Empress Ballroom
27 March 2013	Edinburgh	Scotland	Usher Hall
Leg 3: Japan
14 June 2013	Osaka	Japan	Imp Hall
15 June 2013	Nagoya	Japan	Club Quattro
17 June 2013	Tokyo	Japan	O-East
18 June 2013	Tokyo	Japan	O-East
Leg 4: Australia
18 July 2013	Sydney	Australia	Enmore Theatre
19 July 2013	Brisbane	Australia	The Hi-fi
21 July 2013	Melbourne	Australia	Palace Theatre
23 July 2013	Melbourne	Australia	Palace Theatre
25 July 2013	Perth	Australia	Metro City Concert Club
Leg 5: North America
19 September 2013	Philadelphia	United States	Theatre of Living Arts
20 September 2013	Boston	United States	House of Blues
21 September 2013	New York City	United States	Terminal 5
22 September 2013	Washington, D.C.	United States	9:30 Club
24 September 2013	Montreal	Canada	Corona Theatre
25 September 2013	Toronto	Canada	The Music Hall
27 September 2013	Detroit	United States	Saint Andrew's Hall
28 September 2013	Chicago	United States	The Vic Theatre
29 September 2013	Minneapolis	United States	Mill City Nights
1 October 2013	Denver	United States	Bluebird Theater
4 October 2013	Seattle	United States	Showbox at the Market
5 October 2013	Portland	United States	Wonder Ballroom
6 October 2013	Vancouver	Canada	Commodore Ballroom
8 October 2013	San Francisco	United States	The Fillmore
10 October 2013	Los Angeles	United States	The Fonda Theatre
13 October 2013	Mexico City	Mexico	Corona festival
Leg 6: United Kingdom and Ireland
7 November 2013	Glasgow	Scotland	The Hydro Arena
8 November 2013	Glasgow	Scotland	The Hydro Arena
9 November 2013	Aberdeen	Scotland	AECC
11 November 2013	Belfast	Northern Ireland	Odyssey Arena
12 November 2013	Dublin	Ireland	The O2
14 November 2013	Manchester	England	Manchester Arena
15 November 2013	Leeds	England	Leeds Arena
16 November 2013	Newcastle	England	Metro Radio Arena
18 November 2013	Nottingham	England	Capital FM Arena
19 November 2013	Birmingham	England	LG Arena
21 November 2013	Brighton	England	Brighton Centre
22 November 2013	Bournemouth	England	Bournemouth International Centre
24 November 2013	Cardiff	Wales	Motorpoint Arena
25 November 2013	Cardiff	Wales	Motorpoint Arena
26 November 2013	Cardiff	Wales	Motorpoint Arena
28 November 2013	London	England	The O2
