= C'est la Vie (Stereophonics song) =

Single by Stereophonics

from the album Keep the Village Alive
- Released: 12 May 2015
- Genre: Rock
- Length: 3:40
- Label: Stylus
- Songwriter: Kelly Jones
- Producers: Kelly Jones; Jim Lowe

Stereophonics singles chronology
| "We Share the Same Sun" (2013) | "C'est la Vie" (2015) | "I Wanna Get Lost with You" (2015) |

Music video
- "C'est la Vie" on YouTube

"C'est la Vie" is a song by Welsh rock band Stereophonics. It is the opening track on their 2015 album Keep the Village Alive and was released as the album's lead single on 12 May 2015 as a digital download. The record was produced by lead-singer Kelly Jones and Jim Lowe while the singer wrote the song. It received a positive response though it is one of the band's lowest charters in the UK.

== Writing and recording ==
"C'est la Vie" was written in the studio in around 45 minutes and was recorded that same day late at night but the band left it for half a year before listening to it again.

== Release and promotion ==
“C’est la Vie” was first played at the Colston Hall in Bristol on the 21st March 2015. For the 2015 Teenage Cancer Trust concert, Stereophonics were slated to play the opening night and during this they unveiled three new songs for their then-unnamed ninth album, including "C'est la Vie". "C'est la Vie" was first broadcast on 11 May 2015 Chris Evans Breakfast Show and was released the following day. A music video was released the same day on the band's Vevo channel, it was directed by Kelly Jones with cinematography by John Conroy and stars Antonia Thomas, Aneurin Barnard and Mathew Aubrey. XFM announced it was their "Record of the Week" two days after release.

Despite several of Jones' lyrics in the past containing strong language or sexual references, this is the first song to receive an "Explicit" rating on iTunes.

== Track listings ==
All tracks are written by Kelly Jones.

Digital download
| No. | Title | Length |
|---|---|---|
| 1. | "C'est la Vie" | 3:40 |

== Personnel ==
Stereophonics

- Kelly Jones – lead vocals, guitar
- Richard Jones – bass guitar
- Adam Zindani – guitar, backing vocals
- Jamie Morrison – drums

Technical

- Production – Kelly Jones, Jim Lowe

== Charts ==
| Chart (2015) | Peak position |
|---|---|
| UK Singles (Official Charts) | 73 |
| UK Indie (Official Charts) | 3 |

== Certifications ==
| Region | Certification | Certified units/sales |
|---|---|---|
| United Kingdom (BPI) | Gold | 400,000^{‡} |
^{‡} Sales+streaming figures based on certification alone.
