= Violins and Tambourines =

Song by Stereophonics

from the album Graffiti on the Train
- Released: 4 March 2013
- Recorded: 2012
- Genre: Alternative rock; blues rock
- Length: 5:00
- Label: Stylus (Note: Stylus Records is under exclusive license to Ignition Records Ltd. This is stated on Ignition Records' website and the credits on the back of the Graffiti on the Train vinyl.)
- Composers: Kelly Jones; Jim Lowe
- Lyricist: Kelly Jones
- Producers: Jones; Lowe

Music video
- "Violins and Tambourines" on YouTube

Audio sample
- "Violins and Tambourines": file; help

"Violins and Tambourines" is a song by Welsh rock band Stereophonics and the seventh track on their 2013 album Graffiti on the Train. It was written from the perspective of a troubled man seeking redemption. David Arnold assisted producers Kelly Jones and Jim Lowe in creating the orchestral arrangements. The song received positive reviews upon the album's release, being called the band's comeback track.

== Writing and release ==
The character in his dream state. He is caught in an underwater net and the woman who tried to save him earlier tries again.

The lyrics of the song are a narration of a troubled man who is struggling with his inner demons. The title references the lyrics of "The Last of the Unplucked Gems" by Canadian band The Tragically Hip, an important influence on Stereophonics. The song was released on Graffiti on the Train on 4 March 2013. The orchestral arrangements were composed by David Arnold along with producers Kelly Jones and Jim Lowe.

=== Music video ===
The music video for "Violins and Tambourines" was directed by lead singer Kelly Jones and this was his first time directing. It was used to first promote the album. The video uses the song's lyrics for the concept of a man driving in a hopeless state seeking redemption. When he stops and goes to a drug store he meets a woman who offers him that but he walks away, feeling he is beyond saving. The character then falls into a dream state where he is under water and the woman who tried to save him before tries again. The video ends with him tangled in a net, not knowing whether he has been saved or not. In the behind the scenes video for the video, Jones explains he got the idea for the video from the lyric, "I killed a man but life is cheap."

== Live performances ==
"Violins and Tambourines" had its live debut on 15 December 2012 at the Newport Centre, Wales. Stereophonics held a tour in March to support Graffiti on the Train and the song was played at all the shows. The band were booked for several summer festivals that year, including Pinkpop Festival and the V Festival, where the song was played live. During their performance at Radio 2 In Concert on 22 August that year, the band played the song halfway through their set list and it was the fifth of 6 songs to be played from the album.

== Critical response ==
"Violins and Tambourines" received positive reviews. Writing for Clash, Kieran Mayall called the song the stand out track on Graffiti on the Train. Sean Adams from Drowned in Sound called it Stereophonics' comeback track and stated it had "reconfigured my notion of who and what Stereophonics had become". Cole Waterman from PopMatters praised the orchestral and guitar sounds in the track, writing: "a pensive piece with blues guitar lines that escalate into a mesmerizing swirl of rapid percussion and strained strings". Along with "Catacomb" and "Roll the Dice", Matthew Horton from the BBC said the last minute of the song "border on the exciting". Andy Gill from The Independent praised Jones' songwriting by calling it "impressive".

At Music OMH, Martin Headon had a mixed response. He praised the arrangement and last minute of the song but stated that "old problems re-surface ... it’s tautological clunkers like “everything is changing, nothing ever seems to stay the same" that stick most in the memory".

== Personnel ==
Stereophonics

- Kelly Jones – lead vocals, guitar
- Richard Jones – bass guitar
- Adam Zindani – guitar, backing vocals
- Javier Weyler – drums

Additional

- Jim Lowe – keyboards, programming
- Mikey Rowe – keyboards

Technical

- Production, mixing – Kelly Jones, Jim Lowe
- Engineering – Lowe
- Mastering – Dick Beetham

== Charts ==
Chart (2013)	Peak position
UK Indie (Official Charts)	27
