= In a Moment =

Single by Stereophonics

from the album Graffiti on the Train
- Released: 4 November 2012
- Recorded: 2012
- Genre: Alternative rock
- Length: 5:26 (album); 4:22 (radio edit)
- Label: Stylus; Ignition
- Songwriter: Kelly Jones
- Producers: Kelly Jones; Jim Lowe

Stereophonics singles chronology
"Could You Be the One?" (2010)	"In a Moment" (2012)	"Indian Summer" (2013)

Music video
- "In a Moment" on YouTube

"In a Moment" is a song by rock band Stereophonics. It is the ninth track on their 2013 album Graffiti on the Train and was released as the album's lead-single on 4 November 2012.

== Writing and release ==
When speaking to NME, lead singer Kelly Jones described the song as "about finding some hope in life. It's about those moments in life when you feel a bit lost and stuck and you don't know how to get out of it and then there's a glimmer of hope that helps you pull through it. It's quite a spiritual song."

The drum loop which is featured throughout the song was programmed by fellow producer Jim Lowe. Although Javier Weyler recorded the drums for the song, this was the first single to be released without him in the band, as he left in July 2012.

=== Formats ===
Stereophonics released "In a Moment" as a free download on 4 November 2012. Due to it being free the song was not eligible to chart. Promotional singles were made available on 12 November 2012 which featured the song, radio edit and the instrumental version. The limited 10" vinyl edition with lyrics etched on Side B was available to pre-order on the band's website and was released on 4 November 2012. The cover art for "In a Moment" was designed by Steve Goddard who also designed the oil painting artwork for Graffiti on the Train.

=== Music video ===
Browne's character giving the homeless man (Carter) food and taking back his money.

The music video for "In a Moment" was directed by lead singer Kelly Jones and stars Liam Browne as a man stuck in a moment and Charlie Carter as a homeless man. It features an unnamed character (Browne) who tries to give money to homeless people but they refuse, wanting the food he's got instead. One of the homeless men (Carter) whom he offered money to, helps assist the character in taking his own life by burying him in the sand at the seashore, so when the tide comes in he would drown. The homeless man leaves the shovel in arms reach for the character, in case he changes his mind, and he also leaves the food and the wine he was given. As the character is about to drown, he then sees his good and bad memories, and realises his life is relevant and will get better, so he digs himself out before it's too late.

For the scene in which the character is buried in the sand, Browne's body was placed in a wooden box under the sand to prevent him from being physically buried and the top of the box was covered with sand, leaving his head above the sand and creating the illusion he's been physically buried. In the later scene when he gets out of the sand, Browne was buried in the sand horizontally.

== Track listings ==
All tracks are written by Kelly Jones

Promo CD
No.	Title	Length
1.	"In a Moment" (Radio edit)	4:22
2.	"In a Moment" (Album version)	5:25
3.	"In a Moment" (Instrumental)	5:24
Total length:		15:11

10" vinyl
No.	Title	Length
1.	"In a Moment"	5:26

== Personnel ==
Stereophonics

- Kelly Jones – lead vocals, guitar
- Richard Jones – bass guitar
- Adam Zindani – guitar, backing vocals
- Javier Weyler – drums

Technical

- Production – Kelly Jones, Jime Lowe
- Mixing – Jones, Lowe
- Engineering – Lowe
- Mastering – Dick Beetham

== Charts ==
Chart (2012)	Peak position
UK Indie (Official Charts)	35

== Release history ==
Region	Date	Type	Label
United Kingdom	4 November 2012	Digital download	Stylus Records (Note: Stylus Records is under exclusive license to Ignition Records Ltd. This is stated on Ignition Records' website and the credits on the back of the "In a Moment" vinyl.)
United Kingdom	12 November 2012	Promo CD	Stylus Records
United Kingdom	10 December 2012	10" vinyl	Stylus Records
