= Graffiti on the Train (song) =

2013 single by Stereophonics

Single by Stereophonics

from the album Graffiti on the Train
- Released: 13 May 2013
- Recorded: 2012–2013
- Genre: Alternative rock
- Length: 5:04 (album); 4:27 (radio edit)
- Label: Stylus; Ignition
- Songwriter: Kelly Jones
- Producers: Kelly Jones; Jim Lowe

Stereophonics singles chronology
"Indian Summer" (2013)	"Graffiti on the Train" (2013)	"We Share the Same Sun" (2013)

Music video
- "Graffiti on the Train" on YouTube

"Graffiti on the Train" is a song by rock band Stereophonics. It is the second track on their 2013 studio album of the same name and was released as the third single from the album on 13 May 2013.

== Background and release ==
Writing for "Graffiti on the Train" started when lead singer Kelly Jones thought children were trying to break into his house. When he caught them one time they explained to him they were trying to get to the railway behind his house to spray graffiti on a train. The idea that they were trying to spray a proposal message on one of the trains stuck with Jones and subsequently appeared in the song's lyrics.

=== Formats ===
Promotional singles were made available which featured the song as well as the radio edit and the instrumental version and was released on 22 April 2013. The limited 10" vinyl edition with lyrics etched on Side B was available to pre-order on the band's website and was released on 13 May 2013.

The cover art for "Graffiti on the Train" was designed by Steve Goddard. The artwork was featured in Graffiti on the Train's album booklet.

=== Release history ===
Region	Date	Type	Label
United Kingdom	22 April 2013	Promo CD	Stylus Records (Note: Stylus Records is under exclusive licence to Ignition Records Ltd. This is stated on Ignition Records' website and the credits on the back of the "Graffiti on the Train" vinyl.)
United Kingdom	13 May 2013	10" vinyl	Stylus Records

=== Music video ===
The music video for "Graffiti on the Train" was directed by Jones and was shot at the Empress Ballroom in Blackpool. It features Stereophonics performing and is the first music video from Graffiti on the Train to only feature the band as the previous videos featured various other people. During the verses, handwriting of the lyrics appear as Jones sings them.

== Live performances ==
"Graffiti on the Train" made its live debut at Electric Brixton, London. Stereophonics held a March tour to support Graffiti on the Train and the title song was played at every venue. It has become a regular in their set list since its debut. During the band's summer festival run, they played "Graffiti on the Train" at these festivals, including Pinkpop Festival, T in the Park and the V Festival. The song was one of the 6 songs from the album played at Radio 2 in Concert.

== Track listings ==
All tracks are written by Kelly Jones

Promo CD
No.	Title	Length
1.	"Graffiti on the Train" (Radio edit)	4:27
2.	"Graffiti on the Train" (Album version)	5:03
3.	"Graffiti on the Train" (Instrumental)	5:02
Total length:		14:32

10" vinyl
No.	Title	Length
1.	"Graffiti on the Train"	5:04

== Personnel ==
Stereophonics

- Kelly Jones – lead vocals, guitar
- Richard Jones – bass guitar
- Adam Zindani – guitar, backing vocals
- Javier Weyler – drums

Additional

- Jim Lowe – keyboards, programming

Technical

- Production – Kelly Jones, Jime Lowe
- Mixing – Jones, Lowe
- Engineering – Lowe
- Mastering – Dick Beetham

== Charts ==
Chart (2013)	Peak
UK singles chart	44
UK Indie Chart	7
