= Zindani =

Zindani is a surname. Notable people with the surname include:

- Abdul Majeed al-Zindani (1942–2024), Yemeni politician
- Adam Zindani (born 1972), British guitarist
- Shaya al-Zindani (born 1954), Yemeni politician
