= Indian Summer (Stereophonics song) =

Single by Stereophonics

from the album Graffiti on the Train
- Released: 21 January 2013
- Recorded: 2011–12
- Genre: Alternative rock; folk rock
- Length: 4:27
- Label: Stylus; Ignition
- Songwriter: Kelly Jones
- Producers: Jim Lowe; Kelly Jones

Stereophonics singles chronology
"In a Moment" (2012)	"Indian Summer" (2013)	"Graffiti on the Train" (2013)

"Indian Summer" is a song by Welsh rock band Stereophonics, written by the band's lead singer Kelly Jones. It was the second single from their eighth studio album Graffiti on the Train (2013), released as a digital download in the United Kingdom on 21 January 2013 and as a limited edition 10″ vinyl single on 25 February. The song peaked at number 30 on the UK Singles Chart on 10 March 2013, becoming their first UK top-40 single since 2007 and 25th UK top-40 single in total.

== Music video ==
A music video to accompany the release of "Indian Summer" was first released onto YouTube on 17 January 2013. It marks Jamie Morrison's first appearance in a music video for the band, even though Javier Weyler played the recorded drums on the track before his departure. It was shot in Leicestershire at a combination of the Music Cafe on Braunstone Gate in the city as well as the Great Central Railway which runs through the county. Kelly Jones directed the music video starring Caroline Ford as a girl who seduces a young musician (Kerr Logan, playing a younger version of Kelly) during the course of a train journey.

== Track listings ==
Digital download
No.	Title	Length
1.	"Indian Summer"	4:27
2.	"Indian Summer" (Music video)	4:51

== Charts ==
Chart (2013)	Peak position
Belgium (Ultratip Bubbling Under Flanders)	48
Ireland (IRMA)	33
Scottish Singles Sales (Official Charts)	15
Slovakia Airplay (ČNS IFPI)	84
UK Singles (Official Charts)	30
UK Indie (Official Charts)	5

== Certifications ==
Region	Certification	Certified units/sales
United Kingdom (BPI)	Gold	400,000^{‡}
^{‡} Sales+streaming figures based on certification alone.

== Release history ==
Region	Date	Format	Label
United Kingdom	21 January 2013	Digital download	Ignition Records
