= Make 'Em Laugh, Make 'Em Cry, Make 'Em Wait =

Studio album by Stereophonics
- Released: 25 April 2025
- Recorded: December 2024 – January 2025
- Studio: Stylus (London); RAK (London); Metropolis (London)
- Length: 29:42
- Label: EMI
- Producer: Kelly Jones

Stereophonics chronology
Oochya! (2022)	Make 'Em Laugh, Make 'Em Cry, Make 'Em Wait (2025)

Singles from Make 'Em Laugh, Make 'Em Cry, Make 'Em Wait
- 1. "There's Always Gonna Be Something" Released: 30 January 2025; 2. "Seems Like You Don't Know Me" Released: 20 March 2025; 3. "Make It on Your Own" Released: 24 April 2025; 4. "Colours of October" Released: 25 September 2025

Make 'Em Laugh, Make 'Em Cry, Make 'Em Wait is the thirteenth studio album by Welsh rock band Stereophonics. It was released on 25 April 2025 through EMI. With a runtime of about 30 minutes, the album is the shortest in the band's history.

== Background and singles ==
After the release of his solo studio album Inevitable Incredible in May 2024, lead singer Kelly Jones was approached to come up with two new songs for a Stereophonics compilation album but ended up recording a whole new album after the record company had gotten ahold of a few demos. As a result, Jones intended to create a project that is "very concise, very compact, very melodic", which is how he pictured the band to sound in 2025. Make 'Em Laugh, Make 'Em Cry, Make 'Em Wait was written and recorded in London and was described as a "hopeful and joyous album" as well as "devoid of any fat or filler".

The album came out as having "ingredients from everything" they had done before. Speaking about the album title, Jones revealed that it derived from phrase he had been carrying with him for a long time. Having visited several art galleries in New York City, Jones felt particularly inspired by Art Is a Guaranty of Sanity, a painting by French-American artist Louise Bourgeois, to create the artwork for the album, which eventually came out pink. Thus, Jones started referring to the album as the "pink album".

Stereophonics announced the album along with the release of the lead single "There's Always Gonna Be Something" on 30 January 2025. The second single "Seems Like You Don't Know Me" was released on 20 March.

== Critical reception ==
Professional ratings
Review scores
Source	Rating
Clash	8/10
Classic Rock	3/5 stars
Hot Press	7/10
MondoSonoro	6/10

Make 'Em Laugh, Make 'Em Cry, Make 'Em Wait received generally positive reviews from music critics with most admitting that it did not "reinvent the wheel". Rating the album eight out of ten, Emma Harrison at Clash called the album "yet another triumph" from the band that is "full of hope and feel good offerings" and reflective of its album title. Edwin McFee of Hot Press opined that the band delivered "a more focused and enjoyable affair than its predecessor" which McFee concluded was a "fine record indeed".

In a more critical review for Classic Rock, Damian Jones wrote that the days are long gone "when their albums really were all killer" and compared the band's output to Oasis as both released "two great albums in the 90s but never did a great one again". Jones thought that Make 'Em Laugh, Make 'Em Cry, Make 'Em Wait did not live up to its promises but "certainly has its moments".

== Track listing ==
All tracks are written by Kelly Jones.

Make 'Em Laugh, Make 'Em Cry, Make 'Em Wait track listing
No.	Title	Length
1.	"Make It on Your Own"	5:20
2.	"There's Always Gonna Be Something"	4:02
3.	"Seems Like You Don't Know Me"	3:37
4.	"Colours of October"	2:46
5.	"Eyes Too Big for My Belly"	2:43
6.	"Mary Is a Singer"	3:19
7.	"Backroom Boys"	4:12
8.	"Feeling of Falling We Crave"	3:43
Total length:		29:42

== Personnel ==
Credits adapted from the album's liner notes.

=== Stereophonics ===
- Kelly Jones – vocals, production, mixing (all tracks), guitars (tracks 1–3, 5), keyboards (1–3); piano, percussion (1, 2); harmonica (2); acoustic guitar, electric guitar (4, 6–8); extra percussion (7), art direction, design, art concept
- Richard Jones – bass
- Jamie Morrison – drums (all tracks), percussion (tracks 3–8)
- Adam Zindani – Atmos guitar (track 4), guitar (7)

=== Additional contributors ===
- Al Clay – mixing
- Dave McNair – mastering
- Phil Parsons – engineering
- Joe Brice – studio assistance
- Liam Hebb – studio assistance
- Fiona Brice – string arrangements, first violin (tracks 1, 4–6)
- Gillon Cameron – first violin (tracks 1, 4–6)
- Charlie Brown – first violin (tracks 1, 4–6)
- Natalia Bonner – second violin (tracks 1, 4–6)
- Ellie Stanford – second violin (tracks 1, 4–6)
- Jessie Murphy – second violin (tracks 1, 4–6)
- Emma Owens – viola (tracks 1, 4–6)
- Fiona Leggat Davies – viola (tracks 1, 4–6)
- Vicky Matthews – cello (tracks 1, 4–6)
- Jonny Byers – cello (tracks 1, 4–6)
- Sean Giddings – piano (tracks 3, 4, 6, 8), keyboards (3), Wurlitzer (5)
- John Ginty – Hammond organ (tracks 4–6, 8)
- Richie Edwards – extra percussion (track 7)
- Jason Mowery – lap steel guitar (track 8)
- Richard Welland – art direction, design

== Charts ==
Chart performance for Make 'Em Laugh, Make 'Em Cry, Make 'Em Wait
Chart (2025)	Peak position
French Albums (SNEP)	166
French Rock & Metal Albums (SNEP)	11
Irish Albums (OCC)	24
Scottish Albums (OCC)	2
Swiss Albums (Schweizer Hitparade)	40
UK Albums (OCC)	1
