= Graffiti on the Train =

Studio album by Stereophonics
- Released: 4 March 2013
- Recorded: January 2011 – October 2012
- Studios: ICP Studios (Brussels); Stylus Studios (London)
- Genres: Rock; alternative rock; pop rock
- Length: 43:04
- Labels: Stylus; Ignition
- Producers: Kelly Jones; Jim Lowe

Stereophonics chronology
| Keep Calm and Carry On (2009) | Graffiti on the Train (2013) | Keep the Village Alive (2015) |

Singles from Graffiti on the Train
- 1. "In a Moment" Released: 4 November 2012; 2. "Indian Summer" Released: 18 January 2013; 3. "Graffiti on the Train" Released: 13 May 2013; 4. "We Share the Same Sun" Released: 12 August 2013

Vinyl and deluxe edition cover

Graffiti on the Train is the eighth studio album by Welsh rock band Stereophonics. Produced by the group's lead-singer and guitarist Kelly Jones and Jim Lowe, it was released on 4 March 2013 on their own Stylus Records. It was the first Stereophonics album since Keep Calm and Carry On (2009), marking their longest gap between album releases to date. It was intended for an October 2012 release date and took nearly two years to complete. This is the last record to feature drummer Javier Weyler, who was officially replaced by Jamie Morrison on 24 September 2012.

The album's earliest idea spawned when children were running across the singer's rooftop to access the trains and spray paint graffiti on one of them. With 40 unfinished song ideas, the band composed 30 of these to be released as an album trilogy but decided against the idea, instead releasing a follow-up (intended to be the second part) on 11 September 2015. Also planned that year is the go-ahead on production for a screenplay of the same name Jones is developing. British film composer David Arnold worked alongside the producers to compose three of the song's orchestral arrangements; the record is seen as a shift in the group's musical style as it incorporates cinematic-style music. Recording sessions were primarily performed at ICP Studios in Brussels, Belgium to concentrate more on the record.

The album was released to a critical success, being called one of their best albums to date; commercial performance contrasted however when compared with previous albums, selling over 300,000 copies in the UK and peaking at number three in the country's albums chart. It produced the band's best performing single since 2007, "Indian Summer", and was nominated for the World's Best Album in 2014. Graffiti on the Train was supported by a world tour named after the album from 2012–2013 and became the tenth most popular tour of 2013.

== Background and writing ==
I wanted to change the way we worked. Find new ways of writing, new ways of listening. We toured every year for 16 years. We always seemed to be in a rush to record an album and get back out there, and not let the band slip down the ladder. It was nice to take time off, take the kids to school, see your mates, and come in here every day with no pressure.

— Kelly Jones

In November 2009, Stereophonics released their seventh studio album which attracted a mixed response from critics and became a commercial failure. Lead-singer Kelly Jones has blamed the low sales on Universal Music Group's choice to release the record during the time The X Factor and other artists were releasing albums. After completing their world tour to support the album in 2010, Stereophonics took a break from recording and releasing an album every two years, resulting in the longest time gap in between two album release dates. Around this time their contract with Mercury Records ended, giving the band a chance to make a fresh start. During Christmas 2010, Jones had concerns that he would not be able to write new songs. Jones explained to Neil McCormick of The Daily Telegraph that his writing references and influences are different from what they were in the past.

Writing for Graffiti on the Train started when Jones thought children were trying to break into his house via the roof. When he caught them one time they told him they were trying to get to the railway behind his house to spray graffiti on a train. The idea that they were trying to spray a love message on the train for a girl who gets the train every morning stuck with Jones and subsequently appeared in the title track. "Violins and Tambourines" was written as a narration of a troubled man who is struggling with his inner demons. "Been Caught Cheating" is a blues song inspired by the late Amy Winehouse. Winehouse was interested for Jones to send the song to her but he never did. "In a Moment" is about finding hope in life "when you feel a bit lost and stuck and you don't know how to get out of it and then there's a glimmer of hope that helps you pull through it", Jones told NME. With the exception of the second verse, the song is written in third-person view. When being interviewed by Clayton Moore of The Marquee, Jones explained themes featured in the album are fear, fearlessness and hope. He also stated the overall theme is "going over some very difficult obstacles and coming out on the other side a better man."

== Recording and production ==
"Violins and Tambourines"
"Violins and Tambourines" is one of three tracks where the orchestral arrangements were handled by David Arnold along with Kelly Jones and Jim Lowe.

The record was produced by Jones and Jim Lowe. Jones has been producing for the band since You Gotta Go There to Come Back and Lowe has been involved with the band since producing their 2004 single "Moviestar". In previous years, Lowe used an sE Electronics Gemini Valve mic to record for Stereophonics, he used it again to capture most of the vocals and some of the guitars on the album. The band chose to record at ICP Studios, Brussels to fully focus on the album instead of sidetracking, which would have happened had they chosen to record in London Jones believed. Known for his "whiskey" vocals, Jones decided to challenge and experiment his vocal limits for the album. While Stereophonics in 2011, Lowe set up Stylus Studios in Shepherd's Bush, London. "Graffiti on the Train", "Roll the Dice" and "Violins and Tambourines" originally had synthetic strings to go along with the music but the band wanted a real orchestral sound for the tracks. Stereophonics' publicist knew English composer David Arnold and so contacted him. Arnold agreed to help the band and assisted Jones and Lowe for the orchestral arrangements on the three tracks.

"Take Me"
Jakki Healy provided additional vocals for "Take Me" by singing the chorus and parts of the verses.

In March 2012, Wired Strings went into Stylus Studios to record the strings for "Indian Summer". "Take Me" features vocals from Jones' partner, Jakki Healy. Originally just to try out and see what female vocals would sound like accompanying Jones', Healy's recorded take remained on the track. "Been Caught Cheating" was recorded in one take. The drum loop featured throughout "In a Moment" was programmed by Lowe. Jones and Lowe began mixing near the end of 2011 into the beginning of 2012. In July that year it was announced that Stereophonics were to collaborate with Tinie Tempah and Labrinth to release two albums, although neither one appeared on Graffiti on the Train. The band had 40 unfinished ideas for the album; nearly 30 of these were recorded and completed. One of the songs that were completed and not included on the album, "Seen That Look Before", was available for an exclusive listen at Yahoo! Music's website and as a bonus track in Japan. Two other songs from the recording sessions, "Overland" and "Zoe", were included in certain deluxe editions of the album. The album has been noted for the band going in a different direction with their music by using a cinematic atmosphere.

=== Second volume and film ===
Graffiti on the Train is to be the first of two volumes of albums, with the latter also containing 10 tracks. In July 2012, Jones said the release date for the second volume will be over the course of 18 months, he has since tweeted on the band's page that the album has been mixed and is due for a release next year. Speaking to Absolute Radio on the Christian O'Connell Breakfast Show, Jones announced they plan to release the successor album early autumn but already have new songs out in May. Some of the tracks from Graffiti on the Train's sessions will make it to the album along with completely new songs and the band are going to play some of these during summer. On 11 May 2015 it was announced that the new album is called Keep the Village Alive and will be released exactly 4 months later; the artwork, track listing and editions were made available the same day on the band's website while the lead single debuted on the Chris Evans Breakfast Show.

Jones is writing a script, also titled Graffiti on the Train, which will tie in the two volumes and has said, "in five years, it will all make sense as one big picture." Director Paul Haggis, who is a fan of the band, has provided input by sending him feedback on the script. Jones has been developing the screenplay with people from BAFTA and Film Agency for Wales who are planning for the film to go into production in 2014. The story is about a young couple who fall in love. The man spray paints love messages on the train for the woman to see every day as she gets the train to work. One day he spray paints "Will you marry me?" but the train crashes and he dies. It will also revolve around two friends from Wales going on a "life-changing" journey after the man dies. One of the characters in the film is called Stylus and Graffiti on the Train "sort of" serves as a soundtrack because they were written simultaneously.

== Release and promotion ==
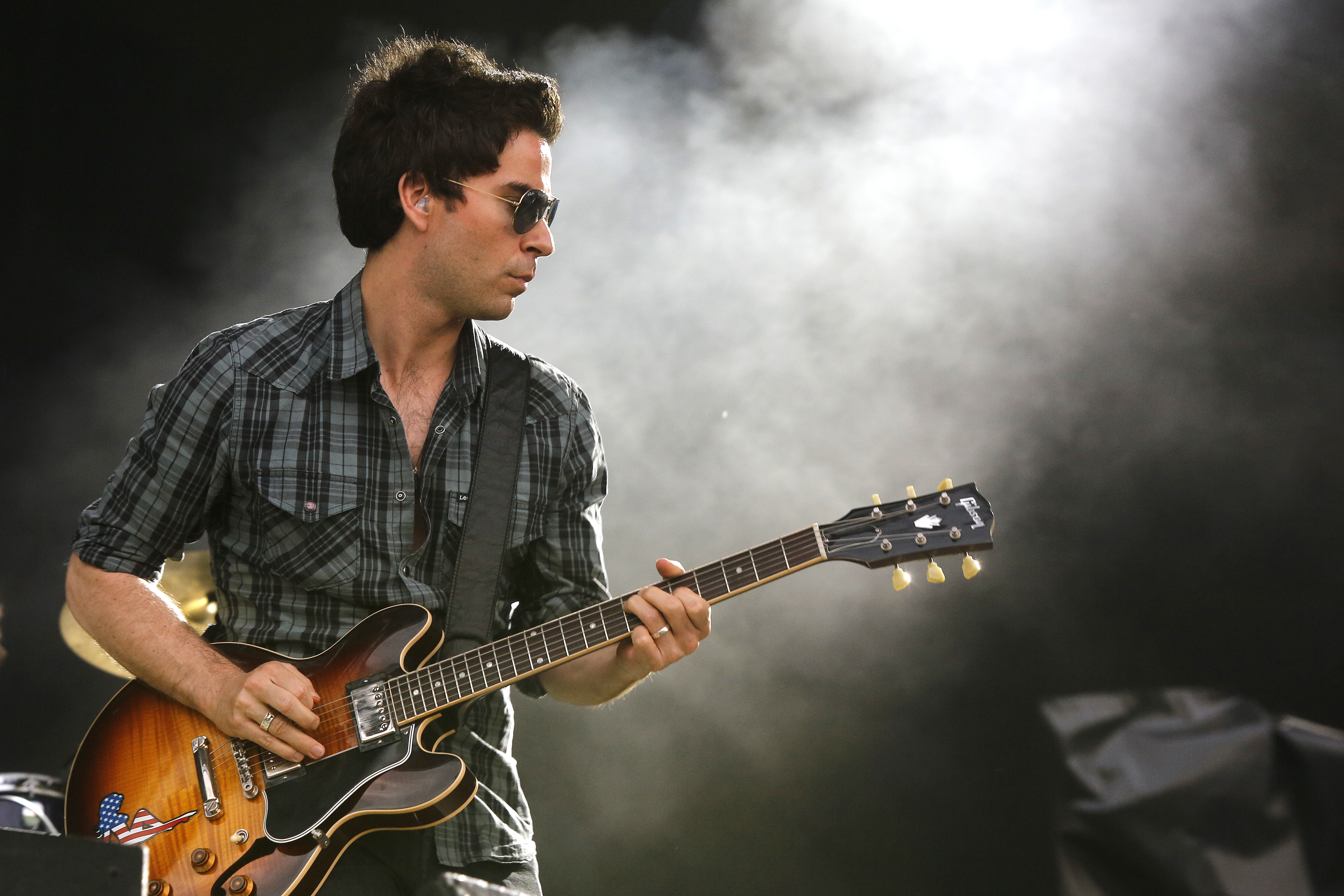
Lead singer and album composer Kelly Jones directed all the music videos for the singles and "Violins and Tambourines".

The decision to release Graffiti on the Train on the band's own label, Stylus Records, (Note: Stylus Records is under exclusive license to Ignition Records. This is stated on the back of the Graffiti on the Train vinyl cover and its singles. It is also listed under "associated labels" on Ignition Records' website.) was due to their disliking of a record company's lack of commitment to the album, which led to them creating it. The album was slatted for a release date sometime in October. Stereophonics started promoting the album through the music video for the song "Violins and Tambourines", directed by Jones who went on to direct the videos for all the singles. At this point a working name for Graffiti on the Train was Violins and Tambourines. With the 30 songs Stereophonics had completed, they intended to release a trilogy of albums but later dismissed the idea after Green Day released their "¡Uno!, ¡Dos!, ¡Tré!" trilogy. In December 2012, the band played 5 shows in the UK to promote the album further, "Indian Summer" and "In a Moment" were played in the first half of the setlist while "Violins and Tambourines" was played as part of the encore. On the last day of February 2013 the album was made available for an exclusive stream on The Daily Telegraph's website.

=== Cover art ===
The cover is by British artist Stephen Goddard. This cover was featured on the deluxe CD and vinyl releases. The bigger of the three heads on the oil painting is referred to as the "Nana head". Much of the CD booklet art is based on some of his work.

A month before the release date, another artwork was made for the album and was included for the single CD and digital download releases. This one was taken by photographer Steve Gullick in London, UK sometime in mid October and includes the newly recruited Jamie Morrison on the cover. Graham Rounthwaite returned for the album's art direction, he had been the art director for all of Stereophonics' album releases since Word Gets Around (1997), except for Just Enough Education to Perform, You Gotta Go There to Come Back and their previous album. Pictures of the band featured in the deluxe edition's booklet were taken by photographer Hans-Peter van Velthoven.

=== Formats ===
The record was released on four major formats, including: standard CD, deluxe CD, vinyl and digital download. The deluxe CD features a bonus disc which contains stripped-down versions of some songs present on the album, a new song called "Overland" and a remix of "In a Moment". The Japanese release featured three bonus tracks, a new track titled "Seen That Look Before" and two live versions of songs from the album: "Violins and Tambourines" and "In a Moment". On the iTunes deluxe edition it features three videos in the studio, a new song called "Zoe", a stripped-down version of "Graffiti on the Train" and the remix of "In a Moment". The latter two songs are present on both the deluxe CD and iTunes deluxe editions.

=== Singles ===
Four singles were released from the album and were all issued as 10" vinyls. "In a Moment" was released as the lead single on 4 November as a free download and again as a vinyl on 10 December 2012. Due to being available to download free of charge, and the vinyl limited in copies, the single was not eligible to chart. "Indian Summer" was released as the second single on 18 January 2013 and is the only single out of the four to have a separate download page from the album on the iTunes Store. The song peaked at number thirty on the UK Singles Chart, becoming Stereophonics' most successful single in the country since "It Means Nothing" reached number twelve in October 2007. The third single was the album title track "Graffiti on the Train" released on 13 May 2013 and peaked at number forty-four in the UK. "We Share the Same Sun" was released as the fourth and final single on 12 August 2013; it failed to chart on the UK Singles Chart and peaked at number twenty-eight on the UK Independent Singles Chart. A music video was uploaded to Stereophonics' YouTube Vevo channel on 4 July.

== Graffiti on the Train Tour ==
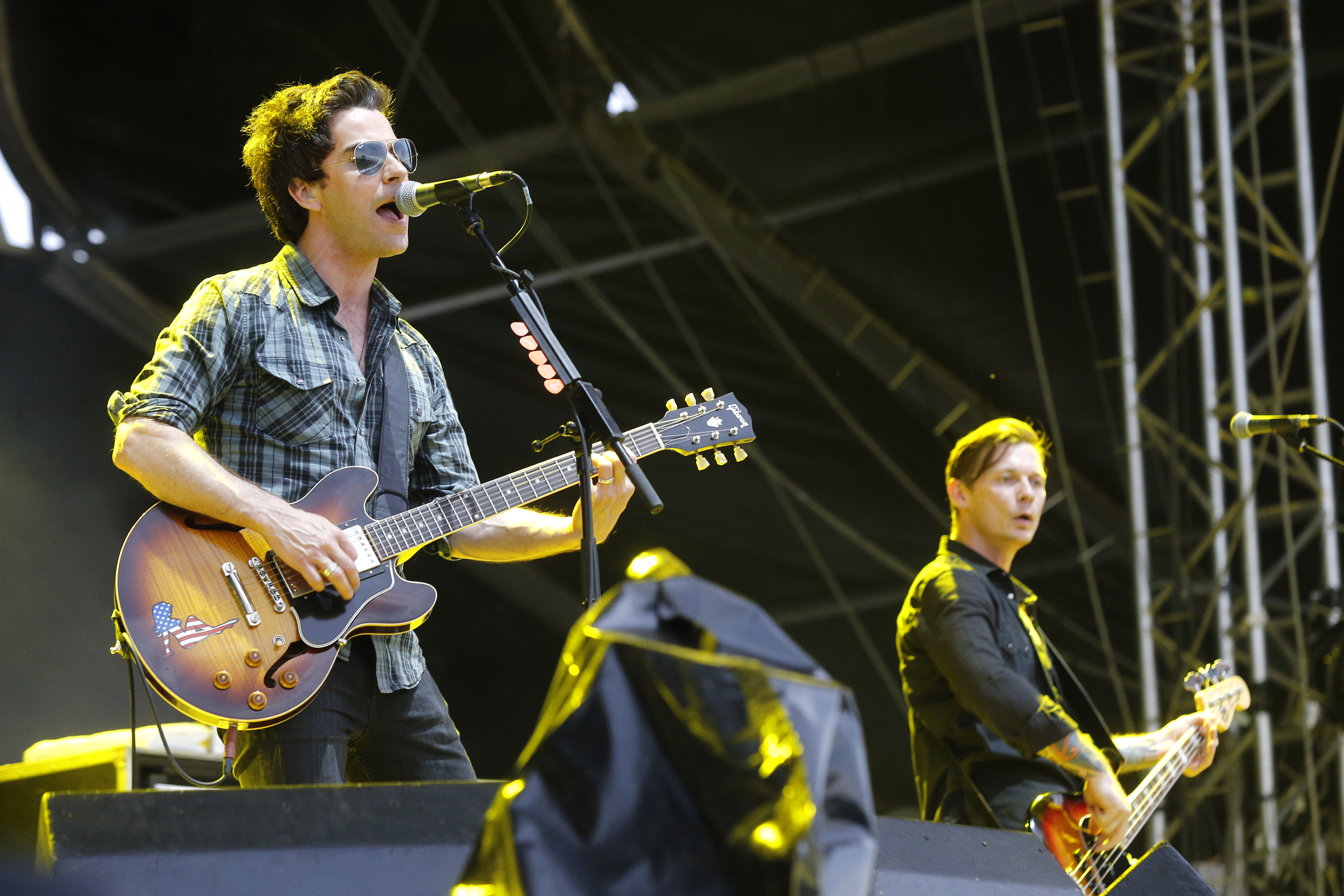
Richard Jones (right) aided Kelly Jones across an airport to make their flight to a show after he twisted his ankle.

Stereophonics held a worldwide tour to support Graffiti on the Train titled the Graffiti on the Train Tour. It began in Leicester, England on 15 March 2013 and finished in London, England on 28 November 2013. The tour has visited the UK, Ireland, Japan, Australia, North America, Mexico and Korea. With a heavy demand for tickets at The SSE Hydro, Glasgow, a second date was added to accommodate. Conversely, this became the first tour in 17 years where the band had to cancel a gig; Kelly Jones suffered from a respiratory tract infection while on the Australian leg, forcing them to cancel a show in Melbourne. During their show at Manchester on 13 November, fellow Welsh musician Tom Jones made a surprise appearance. In December 2013, viagogo revealed the top ten most popular touring acts – Stereophonics were placed at number ten.

== Reception ==
=== Critical response ===
Professional ratings
Aggregate scores
| Source | Rating |
|---|---|
| AnyDecentMusic? | 5.7/10 |
| Metacritic | 64/100 |
Review scores
| Source | Rating |
| AllMusic | 3/5 stars |
| American Songwriter | 4/5 stars |
| Daily Express | 4/5 stars |
| Drowned in Sound | 7/10 |
| Mojo | 3/5 stars |
| NME | 4/10 |
| PopMatters | 8/10 |
| Q | 3/5 stars |
| Sputnikmusic | 3.5/5 stars |
| The Telegraph | 4/5 stars |

Graffiti on the Train has received generally favourable reviews. At Metacritic, which assigns a weighted average rating out of 100 to reviews from mainstream critics, the album received an average score of 64 based on 16 reviews. Kieran Mayall at Clash Music praised Jones' poetic lyrics and called "Violins and Tambourines" a "true lesson" in song writing. Sean Adams from Drowned in Sound praised Jones' vocals as "more cat purringly perfect than ever." Uncut was positive towards Jones' performance and composing, rating the album seven out of ten. Blue Sullivan from Slant Magazine was less enthusiastic about his vocal performance stating they "go from mumbly, po-faced whinging to a passable Rod Stewart." Matthew Horton at the BBC called the album a "solid enough start" for Stereophonics going to the next step of rock.

Sputnikmusic contributor, Raul Stanciu called the album Stereophonics' best since Language. Sex. Violence. Other? (2005) and compared some of the song's sounds to those on You Gotta Go There to Come Back. Moore also compared the song's sound to You Gotta Go There to Come Back by comparing them to the atmosphere of "Maybe Tomorrow". Rating the album eight out of ten, PopMatters contributor, Cole Waterman also called it their best since Language. Sex. Violence. Other? but criticised some of the tracks, calling "No-one's Perfect" a "dull ballad." At American Songwriter, Eric Allen praised the album as a welcome return from Keep Calm and Carry On and called it the "closest any Stereophonics album has come to perfect in nearly a decade." At The Telegraph, they declared it "might be their best in a decade." Adams stated the album could be the band's best record since Word Gets Around (1997). Dave Simpson from The Guardian had a generally positive review, giving it three stars out of five.

Stephen Thomas Erlewine at AllMusic had a generally mixed review, saying the record, "remains distinctly earthbound for all its big aspirations." At No Ripcord, Carl Purvis called it a solid record but criticised the band for not stepping out of their "meat and potatoes" (Note: "Meat and potatoes" is a phrase used, mainly by critics, to describe Stereophonics' music since 2001.) zone. In a negative review, Leonie Cooper of NME summarised the album by saying: "The deft Tom Petty chug of "Indian Summer" is anthemic enough, but there's little else to get excited about." Sullivan rated the album one and half stars out of five, criticising the tracks sounding "like they can't be bothered to get off the couch."

=== Commercial performance ===
Graffiti on the Train charted at number three in the UK Album Charts on 10 March 2013, becoming their third studio album to miss out on the top-spot. It debuted at number two in Scotland and reached number one on the UK Indie chart. Four days after its release, the album was given a silver certification by the BPI, it went on further to get a gold certification on 3 May 2013 and then over a year later platinum status on 2 October 2014. The album took nearly as long as Word Gets Around to receive a platinum status, taking over a year and a half to gain the award. It has, however, been in the UK charts for 34 weeks—making it the band's longest remaining studio album since Language. Sex. Violence. Other? To date, the album has sold over 300,000 copies in the UK, while this outsold their previous two albums it failed to repeat the success their albums had set prior to the release of Pull the Pin. At the end of 2013 it was the country's 24th biggest selling album of that year.

Outside of their home territory the record has been the band's strongest chart performer since Language. Sex. Violence. Other? In Ireland the record reached number thirteen (Note: Language. Sex. Violence. Other? (2005) reached number one, Pull the Pin (2007) reached number fifteen and Keep Calm and Carry On (2009) reached number thirty-two.) on the albums chart while peaking at number three on the indie chart, remaining in the albums chart for eleven weeks. In Austria it managed to peak at number sixty-three and remained in the chart for one week, their first album to chart since 2005. On the Belgian (Flanders) chart the album peaked at number forty-four for a week – it stayed on the charts for fifteen weeks, the longest a Stereophonics album has remained. While on the Belgian (Wallonia) chart it was their best performer since Just Enough Education to Perform (2003) reaching number fifty-five, though it was not their longest chart run.

The album has also been one of their weakest performing outside the UK. Out of the four albums that have charted in Australia, Graffiti on the Train ranks as the third top placing for peaking at number forty-two and remained in the charts for one week. In France the record is their second worst chart placement at number fifty-eight, followed only by Keep Calm and Carry On and stayed in the charts for five weeks.

=== Accolade ===
Graffiti on the Train was nominated for the World's Best Album at the 2014 World Music Awards.

== Track listing ==
All tracks are written by Kelly Jones; "Violins and Tambourines" music co-written by Jim Lowe.

| No. | Title | Length |
|---|---|---|
| 1. | "We Share the Same Sun" | 3:44 |
| 2. | "Graffiti on the Train" | 5:03 |
| 3. | "Indian Summer" | 4:27 |
| 4. | "Take Me" | 3:51 |
| 5. | "Catacomb" | 3:14 |
| 6. | "Roll the Dice" | 4:04 |
| 7. | "Violins and Tambourines" | 5:00 |
| 8. | "Been Caught Cheating" | 4:21 |
| 9. | "In a Moment" | 5:26 |
| 10. | "No-one's Perfect" | 4:00 |
| Total length: | | 43:04 |

Graffiti on the Train – Deluxe edition (bonus disc)
| No. | Title | Length |
|---|---|---|
| 11. | "Overland" | 3:23 |
| 12. | "In a Moment" (Alternative version) | 4:35 |
| 13. | "We Share the Same Sun" (Up Close) | 4:03 |
| 14. | "Indian Summer" (Up Close) | 4:51 |
| 15. | "Graffiti on the Train" (Stripped) | 4:46 |
| 16. | "In a Moment" (Toydrum Remix) | 6:27 |
| Total length: | | 28:05 |

Graffiti on the Train – Japanese edition (bonus tracks)
| No. | Title | Length |
|---|---|---|
| 11. | "Seen That Look Before" | 4:22 |
| 12. | "Violins and Tambourines" (live) | 5:45 |
| 13. | "In a Moment" (live) | 5:59 |
| Total length: | | 16:16 |

Graffiti on the Train – iTunes edition (bonus tracks)
| No. | Title | Length |
|---|---|---|
| 11. | "Zoe" | 4:05 |
| 12. | "Graffiti on the Train" (Stripped) | 4:45 |
| 13. | "In a Moment" (Toydrum Remix) | 6:27 |
| 14. | "We Share the Same Sun" (In the Studio – Video) | 3:52 |
| 15. | "Indian Summer" (In the Studio – Video) | 4:28 |
| 16. | "In a Moment" (Alternative Version in the Studio – Video) | 4:33 |
| Total length: | | 28:10 |

== Personnel ==
Stereophonics

- Kelly Jones – lead vocals, guitar, keyboards, orchestral arrangements on tracks 2, 6, 7
- Richard Jones – bass guitar
- Adam Zindani – guitar, backing vocals
- Javier Weyler – drums

Additional

- Jim Lowe – keyboards, programming, orchestral arrangements on tracks 2, 6, 7
- David Arnold – orchestral arrangements on tracks 2, 6, 7
- Nicholas Dodd – orchestration
- Kerenza Peacock – violin on track 3
- Emma Owens – viola on track 3
- Rosie Danvers – cello on track 3
- Jakki Healy – vocals on track 4
- Mikey Rowe – keyboards on tracks 7, 8, 10

Technical

- Production – Kelly Jones, Jim Lowe
- Mixing – Carl Young
- Engineering – Lowe
- Studio Assistant at ICP Studios – Paul Edouard-Laurendeau
- Mastering – Dick Beetham

Orchestra

- Violins – Leader John Bradbury, Leader of 2nds Roger Garland
- Violin section – Rolf Wilson, Warren Zielinski, Rita Manning, Dave Woodcock, Eos Chater, Debbie Widdup, Maciej Rakowski, Steve Morris, Boguslaw Kostecki, Dai Emanuel, Emlyn Singleton, Philippa Ibbotson, Perry Montague-Mason, Patrick Kiernan, Mark Berrow, Tom Pigott-Smith
- Celli – 1st Johnathan Williams
- Cello section – Tony Lewis, Dave Daniels, Frank Schaefer, Martin Loveday, Paul Kegg
- French horns – 1st Richard Bissill, Michael Thompson, Simon Rayner, Richard Berry
- Trumpets – 1st Derek Watkins, John Barclay, Stuart Brooks
- Tenor trombones – 1st Andy Wood, Lindsay Shilling
- Bass trombones – 1st Dave Stewart, Darren Smith

=== Bonus disc ===
Additional

- Mikey Rowe – keyboards on track 1
- Tony Kirkham – piano on track 2
- Jamie Morrison – drums on track 5
- Leo Taylor – drums on track 6
- Matthew Pierce – keyboards

Technical

- Remixing, recording, engineering on track 6 – Pablo Clements and James Griffith
- Mixing – Chris Allen

== Charts and certifications ==
=== Weekly charts ===
| Chart (2013) | Peak position |
|---|---|
| Australian Albums Chart | 42 |
| Austrian Albums Chart | 63 |
| Belgium Albums Chart (Flanders) | 41 |
| Belgium Albums Chart (Wallonia) | 55 |
| Dutch Albums Chart | 51 |
| French Albums Chart | 58 |
| Irish Albums Chart | 13 |
| Irish Indie Albums Chart | 3 |
| Italian Albums Chart | 67 |
| Scottish Albums Chart | 2 |
| Spanish Albums Chart | 69 |
| UK Albums Chart | 3 |
| UK Download Chart | 2 |
| UK Indie Albums Chart | 1 |

=== Singles chart ===
| Year | Song | Chart peak positions | | | | |
| Year | Song | BE (Fle) | IRE | JPN | UK | UK Indie |
|---|---|---|---|---|---|---|
| 2012 | "In a Moment" | - | - | - | - | - |
| 2013 | "Indian Summer" | 29 | 33 | 36 | 30 | 5 |
| 2013 | "Graffiti on the Train" | - | - | - | 44 | 7 |
| 2013 | "We Share the Same Sun" | - | - | - | - | 28 |

=== Year-end charts ===
| Chart (2013) | Position |
|---|---|
| UK Albums Chart | 24 |

=== Certifications ===
| Region | Certification | Certified units/sales |
|---|---|---|
| United Kingdom (BPI) | Platinum | 300,000^{*} |
^{*} Sales figures based on certification alone.

== Release history ==
| Region | Date | Version | Format | Label |
|---|---|---|---|---|
| Japan | 27 February 2013 | Standard edition; deluxe edition | CD | Stylus Records |
| Australia | 1 March 2013 | Standard edition | CD | Stylus Records |
| Ireland | 4 March 2013 | Standard edition; deluxe edition | CD; vinyl; digital download | Stylus Records |
| United Kingdom | 4 March 2013 | Standard edition; deluxe edition | CD; vinyl; digital download | Stylus Records |
| United States | 3 September 2013 | Standard edition | CD; vinyl; digital download | Stylus Records |
| Canada | 3 September 2013 | Standard edition; deluxe edition | CD; vinyl; digital download | MapleMusic Recordings |
