= Chaos from the Top Down =

Single by Stereophonics
- Released: 13 February 2019
- Genre: Rock
- Length: 3:51
- Label: Parlophone
- Songwriter: Kelly Jones
- Producers: Jones; George Drakoulias

Stereophonics singles chronology
"Caught by the Wind" (2017)	"Chaos from the Top Down" (2019)	"Fly Like an Eagle" (2019)

Music video
- "Chaos from the Top Down" on YouTube

"Chaos from the Top Down" is a song by Welsh rock band Stereophonics, written by the band's lead singer Kelly Jones. It was released as the band's first stand alone single on 13 February 2019 on streaming platforms and as a digital download. The track was produced by Kelly Jones and George Drakoulias at The Distillery studios and mixed by Al Clay at Metropolis studios. Jones decided to release the song as a stand along single due to the political climate at the time. He also said it didn't fit with the style of album he was writing.

The song was written from the perspective of a fifteen-year-old boy lying in the road after being shot. Kelly Jones explained "“Chaos from the Top Down’ is a song sung from the imagined perspective of a fifteen-year-old boy laying in the road after being shot. He’s reflecting in his time of dying about his life and the choices he made through the lack of options and opportunities he felt he had in today’s Britain." Jones said it was based on a true story that happened just outside his street.

A lyric video for the song was released on Stereophonics' official YouTube channel on 13 February 2019

== Charts ==
Chart (2019)	Peak position
Scotland (Scottish Singles Chart)	91
