= Oochya! =

Studio album by Stereophonics
- Released: 4 March 2022
- Recorded: April–June 2021
- Studio: Ramsbury Brewery & Distillery (Marlborough, Wiltshire)
- Genre: Rock
- Length: 64:12
- Label: Stylus; Ignition
- Producer: Kelly Jones; Jim Lowe; George Drakoulias

Stereophonics chronology
Kind (2019)	Oochya! (2022)	Make 'Em Laugh, Make 'Em Cry, Make 'Em Wait (2025)

Singles from Oochya!
- 1. "Hanging on Your Hinges" Released: 6 September 2021; 2. "Do Ya Feel My Love?" Released: 10 November 2021; 3. "Forever" Released: 25 January 2022; 4. "Right Place Right Time" Released: 27 May 2022; 5. "When You See It" Released: 22 June 2022

Oochya! is the twelfth studio album by Welsh rock band Stereophonics, released on 4 March 2022 on Ignition Records. It was supported by a 2022 UK arena tour.

== Background ==
Oochya! originally began life when the band were planning a 25th anniversary compilation. Frontman Kelly Jones said, "I began rooting through hard drives to see what to put on it. As I did that, I was finding songs we'd never released. Three or four songs on Oochya! are built on those, and it led me to writing a bunch of new songs too." Jones also described the album as "90 percent" uptempo.

== Release and promotion ==
=== Singles ===
On 6 September 2021, the band released the first single taken from the album, "Hanging on Your Hinges". The song premiered on The Chris Evans Breakfast Show on Virgin Radio UK. An official lyric video was also uploaded to YouTube. "Do Ya Feel My Love?" was released as the second single in November 2021. "Forever" was released as the third single from the album on 25 January 2022, followed by an official video a week later.

== Critical reception ==
Professional ratings
Aggregate scores
Source	Rating
Metacritic	69/100
Review scores
Source	Rating
The Daily Telegraph	3/5 stars
Forge Press	3/5
The Guardian	3/5 stars
Gigwise	6/10
laut.de	4/5 stars
Louder Sound	4/5 stars
musicOMH	3.5/5 stars
Record Collector	4/5 stars
The Sydney Morning Herald	1.5/5 stars
Under the Radar	7/10

Oochya! received mixed to positive reviews from music critics, with a number of them praising several standout tracks but noting that the fifteen-song tracklist resulted in thematic exhaustion and cliché. Dave Simpson, writing for The Guardian, said that the band was "past their best nowadays" but the album was "a decent effort after a quarter of a century" and said that the album "offers an occasionally uneven mix of their trusty hit formula". Harrison Smith of Gigwise wrote that "Stereophonics have tended to serve up middle-of-the-road ballads in recent times and found themselves in the realms of predictability. Oochya!, whilst dishing up much of the same, is a much more robust and energised project than the previous few albums". Graeme Marsh wrote for musicOMH that the album was "better than expected" given its mix of old and new material and that the quality of its singles varied more than a typical Stereophonics album but concluded that "Oochya! is undoubtedly one of Stereophonics’ better albums in recent times even if, at 15 tracks, it's a little too long".

== Commercial performance ==
On 11 March 2022, Oochya! became Stereophonics' eighth number-one album on the UK Albums Chart, outselling their closest competition by 2:1. Oochya! sold just over 24,000 copies in its first week, including just under 4,000 copies on vinyl. The album spent five weeks on the chart. The album is also the band's second consecutive chart-topper after 2019's Kind.

== Track listing ==
All tracks written by Kelly Jones.

No.	Title	Length
1.	"Hanging on Your Hinges"	2:57
2.	"Forever"	4:24
3.	"When You See It"	4:21
4.	"Do Ya Feel My Love?"	3:57
5.	"Right Place Right Time"	4:42
6.	"Close Enough to Drive Home"	4:05
7.	"Leave the Light On"	4:54
8.	"Running Round My Brain"	3:30
9.	"Every Dog Has Its Day"	4:48
10.	"You're My Soul"	5:22
11.	"All I Have Is You"	5:44
12.	"Made a Mess of Me"	3:59
13.	"Seen That Look Before"	4:23
14.	"Don't Know What Ya Got"	4:49
15.	"Jack in a Box"	2:17
Total length:		64:12

== Charts ==
Chart performance for Oochya!
Chart (2022)	Peak position
Belgian Albums (Ultratop Flanders)	153
Belgian Albums (Ultratop Wallonia)	128
French Albums (SNEP)	138
German Albums (Offizielle Top 100)	49
Irish Albums (OCC)	31
Italian Albums (FIMI)	96
Scottish Albums (OCC)	1
Swiss Albums (Schweizer Hitparade)	22
UK Albums (OCC)	1
UK Independent Albums (OCC)	1

== Certifications ==
Certifications for Oochya!
Region	Certification	Certified units/sales
United Kingdom (BPI)	Silver	60,000^{‡}
^{‡} Sales+streaming figures based on certification alone.

== Release history ==
Release history and formats for Oochya!
Region	Date	Format	Label
United Kingdom	4 March 2022	CD; vinyl; digital download; streaming	Ignition
