= Jamie Morrison =

British musician and producer

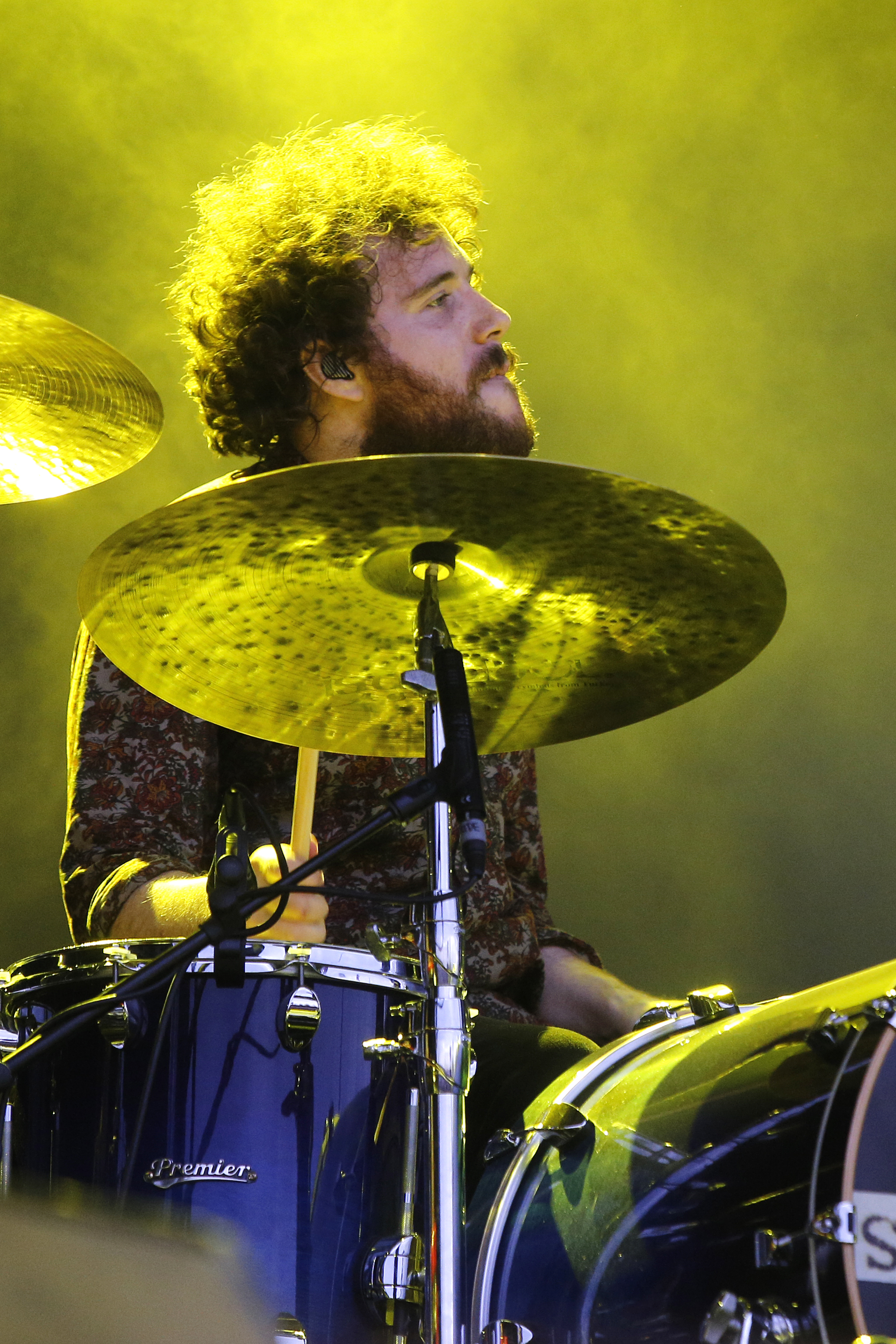
- Morrison in 2013

Background information
- Also known as: Pop Morrison
- Born: James Ross Morrison; 30 June 1983 (age 43)
- Genres: Rock; pop
- Occupation: Musician
- Instruments: Drums; percussion
- Labels: Motown; Parlaphone; Mercury; Bella Union; Yalla; Stylus; Ninjas & Wolves
- Website: popmorrison.com

Jamie Morrison (born 30 June 1983) is a British drummer, producer, and author. He is best known as the drummer for the Welsh rock band Stereophonics, a role he has held since 2012. He is also a founding member of the indie rock band Noisettes and a current member of 86TVs, alongside members of The Maccabees.

== Biography ==
Morrison has contributed to multiple UK number one albums with Stereophonics and co-wrote the 2009 international hit "Never Forget You" with Noisettes. In addition to his music career, he is a published author, with several books exploring themes of fame, identity, grief, and personal transformation.

== Early life ==
Morrison was born in Scotland and raised in England. He began playing drums at a young age and developed a distinctive, emotionally expressive playing style. He played in various bands throughout his teens before emerging as a sought-after session musician in the early 2000s.

== Career ==
=== Noisettes (2003–2010) ===
Morrison co-founded Noisettes in 2003 alongside singer Shingai Shoniwa and guitarist Dan Smith. The group gained international recognition with their 2009 album Wild Young Hearts, which featured the hit single “Never Forget You.” The track charted internationally and became a defining soul-pop anthem of the late 2000s. Morrison left the band in 2010.

=== Stereophonics (2012–present) ===
In 2012, Morrison joined Stereophonics as their drummer, making his first studio appearance on the album Graffiti on the Train (2013). He has since contributed to five UK number one albums with the band, including their most recent 2025 release Make 'Em Laugh, Make 'Em Cry, Make 'Em Wait (2025). Morrison remains an active and core member of the band, performing on their largest-ever world tour in 2025, which included multiple sold-out stadiums.

=== 86TVs (2023–present) ===
In 2023, Morrison joined 86TVs, a new band formed by Felix, Hugo, and Will White (formerly of The Maccabees). The project blends alternative rock with emotional songwriting and has been well received by fans and critics.

=== Literary work ===
Wonderboy is a semi-autobiographical novel that tells the story of Pop Morrison, a world-famous drummer who discovers a mysterious diary in a New York hotel. The diary's cryptic author, Drewford Alabama, leads Pop on a transformative journey through addiction, ego, and redemption.

Morrison has written over 100 short stories.

== Personal life ==
Morrison is a dedicated gardener and animal lover. He is known for his low-profile lifestyle, often focusing on introspective, multidisciplinary creative work across music, literature, and visual arts.
