= Stereophonics =

Welsh rock band

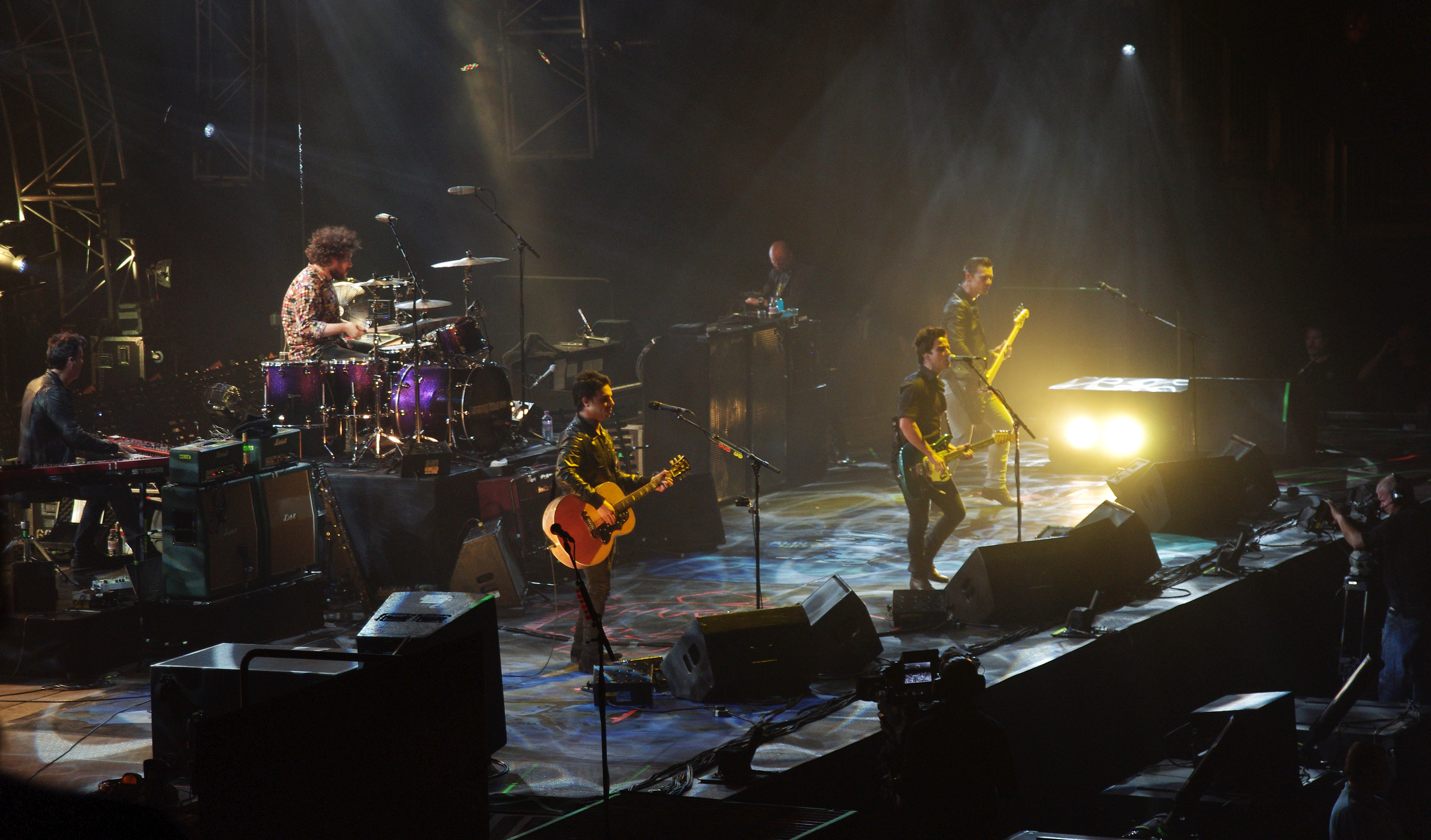
- Stereophonics performing at the O2 Arena, London in November 2013

Background information
- Also known as: Tragic Love Company (1992–1996); The Stereophonics (1996)
- Origin: Cwmaman, Rhondda Cynon Taf, Wales
- Genres: Alternative rock; Britpop (early); post-Britpop; hard rock; indie rock; pop rock
- Works: Discography; songs
- Years active: 1992–present
- Labels: V2; Stylus (Note: Stylus Records is under exclusive licence to Ignition Records Ltd and Parlophone. This is stated in Graffiti on the Train's liner notes and the back of "We Share the Same Sun" vinyl cover. It is also listed under "associated labels" on Ignition Records' website.)
- Members: Kelly Jones; Richard Jones; Adam Zindani; Jamie Morrison
- Past members: Stuart Cable; Javier Weyler
- Website: stereophonics.com

Stereophonics are a Welsh rock band formed in 1992 in the village of Cwmaman in the Cynon Valley. The band consists of Kelly Jones (lead vocals, guitar, keyboards), Richard Jones (no relation to Kelly; bass guitar, harmonica, backing vocals), Adam Zindani (guitar, backing vocals), Jamie Morrison (drums, percussion) and touring member Tony Kirkham (keyboards, guitar). The group previously included Stuart Cable (1992–2003) and then Javier Weyler (2004–2012) on drums. Stereophonics have released thirteen studio albums, including nine UK number-one albums. A successful compilation album, Decade in the Sun, was released in November 2008 and charted at number two on the UK Albums chart.

Described as "classic UK rock delivered with whiskey vocals", the band have been summarised as possessing a sound akin to the genres of alternative rock and "British traditional rock". Stereophonics' debut album, Word Gets Around, was released in August 1997 and charted at number six in the UK, aided by the singles "Local Boy in the Photograph", "More Life in a Tramps Vest" and "A Thousand Trees". The band reached mainstream success with the release of Performance and Cocktails (and its promotional singles "The Bartender and the Thief", "Just Looking" and "Pick a Part That's New") in 1999 and have achieved a total of ten top-ten singles as well as one number one: "Dakota" (2005). Having sold around 10 million copies worldwide by 2016, Stereophonics are one of the most successful Welsh rock acts. Upon the release of Pull the Pin, they achieved five consecutive UK number-one albums.

The band have also been praised for their live performances, which have landed them headlining slots at many of the UK and Ireland's most high-profile music festivals, including Reading and Leeds in 2000, Glastonbury in 2002, V Festival in 2002, the Isle of Wight in 2004 and 2009, Oxegen in 2010, Tramlines Festival and TRNSMT in 2018, and Latitude in 2019. The band is part of the Cardiff music scene.

== History ==
=== Formation and early years (1986–1991) ===
Kelly Jones and Stuart Cable lived on the same street in the Welsh village of Cwmaman. Jones heard Cable played drums so asked if he wanted to jam together. After some time practising in Jones' father's garage, Nicholas Geake joined in on guitar. Later, (Note: Exact dates aren't given in Demons and Cocktails.) Jones invited Paul Rosser and Chris Davies to play on bass guitar and keyboards, respectively. Cable recalls he was the one who suggested that Jones be the singer, as his dad was a singer back in the sixties who supported Roy Orbison. In 1986 the band recorded a demo under the name "Zephyr". When Jones went on holiday the band played a gig without him, which resulted in Jones leaving the band and Jones and Cable going their separate ways. Jones, Rosser and Davies formed their own R&B band called "Silent Runner" while Cable joined a glam-rock band named "King Catwalk" on drums.

A few years later, Cable was sacked from the band. A few weeks later, Cable waved to Jones from a bus, and Jones, who was standing at a bus stop, waved back. It was the first contact they had since Zephyr had broken up. Two weeks later, Jones and Cable started speaking again. They agreed to give the band another go, but Cable only wanted to play their own songs. Jones agreed. The duo invited Mark Everett to play for them on bass guitar and Jones then started writing his own songs.

Everett went on holiday for two weeks but Jones and Cable wanted to continue rehearsing, so Jones invited long-time friend Richard Jones to fill in for Everett. Stunned by Richard's appearance and bass playing, Cable convinced Kelly to keep him instead of Everett. The band decided they needed another member to play lead guitar. Simon Collier was the first guitarist brought in. He did not stay in the band, but instead became Kelly's guitar technician. The band tried hiring two other guitarists, another Richard Jones and Glenn Hyde. Neither stayed for long. Hyde did, however, play harmonica on "Rooftop" for the band's 2001 album Just Enough Education to Perform. After Hyde left, the band stuck as a three-piece act.

=== Name change and V2 Records (1992–1996) ===
Kelly, Richard and Cable began writing and performing music in working men's clubs together in 1992 as a band known as "Tragic Love Company", a name inspired by their favourite bands (the Tragically Hip, Mother Love Bone and Bad Company). After Tragic Love Company supported Smalltown Heroes in the Borderline Club, London, they met Marshall Bird and Steve Bush who were interested in producing for the band. The band agreed and recorded a demo for "A Thousand Trees".

Wayne Coleman organised a series of concerts throughout South Wales after receiving a demo from the band. Wayne liked it a lot but hated the band name and told them they wouldn't be performing unless they changed it. After Cable read the manufacturer name of a gramophone, "Falcon Stereophonic", he told Kelly and the band agreed to change their name to "the Stereophonics". In March 1996, the band played a gig at their local Coliseum Theatre, Aberdare with Catatonia along with local bands Krazy Keyboards (later to become Dylan Thorn), and the Pocket Devils. When the band finished their slot, John Brand approached them and he became their manager. Brand managed to get over 35 record companies in the UK interested in signing the Stereophonics. In May 1996, they signed with V2, the first artists to be signed to newly formed record label. Upon signing, they dropped "the" from their name and simply became "Stereophonics".

=== Debut album and ascent to fame (1997–2000) ===
In August 1997, the band released their first studio album, Word Gets Around, which reached number six in the UK Albums chart, from which five singles were released. The debut single, released 25 November 1996, was "Looks Like Chaplin". Afterwards, the band embarked on a successful world tour.

| Kelly Jones | Richard Jones | Stuart Cable |

In February 1998, the band received a BRIT Award for Best New Group. In the same week, the band re-released the single "Local Boy in the Photograph", which in turn reached number fourteen in the UK Singles chart. The band's debut album, Word Gets Around, also went gold in the UK.

In November 1998, "The Bartender and the Thief" (the first single from the album Performance and Cocktails) was released, eventually reaching number three on the UK charts. "Just Looking" was released next and reached number four in March 1999. In that same month, the album was released, entering at number one and going platinum within three weeks. Later that year, the band played in front of 50,000 people at Morfa Stadium in Swansea. The concert was filmed and released on DVD the following year. They also collaborated with Tom Jones on a cover of the Randy Newman song "Mama Told Me Not to Come", for the Tom Jones album Reload.

Throughout 1998 and 1999, the band toured in Europe, Australia and the US. On 12 June 1998, Stereophonics played to over 10,000 spectators in the grounds of Cardiff Castle in Wales. Footage of the concert was released on VHS and DVD, titled Live at Cardiff Castle.

=== Mainstream success (2001–2004) ===
The band released their third album, Just Enough Education to Perform, in April 2001. The album included the track "Mr. Writer", which includes lyrics that criticise a critic who the band believe gave them a negative review. The album also contained "Have a Nice Day", which reached number five in the UK charts. To promote the new album, Just Enough Education to Perform, Stereophonics played a two-day festival, which was called A Day at the Races. This event was held in Donington Park on the first day and at Cardiff's Millennium Stadium on the second. The concerts were supported by Ash, Black Crowes and the Crocketts, with Proud Mary playing Donington only. Over 200,000 separate tickets were sold for the weekend festival. The performance was released on a DVD in 2002.

2003 saw the release of their fourth album, titled You Gotta Go There to Come Back. In September 2003, drummer Stuart Cable was sacked. According to reports, it was because of his lack of commitment to the band. Cable, at the time, presented a TV show called "Cable TV" and felt that the band would never improve. Because of this, he missed several rehearsals and live concerts. He was eventually replaced by Javier Weyler. Steve Gorman, from the Black Crowes, stood in for Cable during the band's live performances until Weyler was appointed. When asked about Cable leaving the band in a 2010 interview with Rip It Up magazine, Kelly Jones acknowledged the difficulty of the situation.

Towards the end of the year, Stereophonics performed a sold-out tour of the UK, ending with a Christmas show at the Millennium Stadium, Cardiff, supported by Feeder, Ocean Colour Scene and Adam Masterson. The show was closed with a version of "Merry Xmas Everybody", originally recorded by Slade. The group took a break after their 2003–2004 world tour, which included a set at the Manchester Move Festival in July 2004.

=== Drummer changes and Stuart Cable's death (2005–2010) ===
Stereophonics performing in Hamburg, 13 September 2007

Their fifth studio album, Language. Sex. Violence. Other? was released in March 2005. It marked their first recording with new drummer Javier Weyler. The band achieved their first number one hit in the UK singles charts with the album's first single, "Dakota". The second single from the album was "Superman". However, that song did not repeat the success of "Dakota", peaking at number thirteen. After "Superman" came "Devil", featuring a controversial video and reaching number eleven in the charts. The album was expected to win the Pop Factory award at the end of the year for Best Welsh Album, but were not even nominated. Feeder's Pushing the Senses would win the award.

On 2 July 2005, the group appeared at the Live 8 concert in Hyde Park, London, playing to their biggest audience yet. The band were also scheduled to support Oasis for a number of dates across Europe, in early 2006, but pulled out due to family commitments. 2006 also saw the release of Stereophonics' first live album, Live from Dakota. The album is a two-disc compilation, featuring twenty tracks spanning all five of the band's albums and capturing the best of their 2005 world tour. Rather than being a recording of a single show, the tour was recorded every night and the band picked out the best version of each song individually. The album also features a track titled "Jayne", later released as part of Kelly Jones' solo album, Only the Names Have Been Changed.

Pull the Pin was released in the UK on 15 October 2007, along with a download-only taster; "Bank Holiday Monday". The track was also available for free to people who pre-ordered tickets for the band's concerts in 2007. The album was written and recorded by November 2006 but held back for release until late 2007. "It Means Nothing" was the first single of the album, released in September before the LP was released a week later on 15 October. The album contains twelve songs and reached number one in the UK's official album chart. The next single, "My Friends", reached number thirty-two in the UK charts, their poorest chart performance since "More Life in a Tramps Vest" from their debut album.

On 20 May 2007, at Radio 1's Big Weekend in Preston, the band were joined on stage by Casino frontman Adam Zindani. Zindani continued to tour with the band for the remainder of the Pull the Pin tour, playing lead guitar and backing vocals. He has been credited for writing and performing on two of the band's new tracks, "You're My Star" and "My Own Worst Enemy". On "You're My Star", he sings backing vocals and plays lead guitar, whereas on "My Own Worst Enemy" he only plays lead guitar. In November 2008, Stereophonics released their first greatest hits compilation, Decade in the Sun.

On 8 December 2009, the Vancouver Organizing Committee for the 2010 Olympic and Paralympic Winter Games announced the line up for performers for the nightly Victory Ceremonies. These ceremonies included 30 minutes of entertainment from the evening's host province/territory, 30 minutes of medal presentations, and a one-hour performance by a musical talent. Stereophonics performed their song "I Got Your Number" at this event on 20 February – Yukon Night. The band's seventh album, titled Keep Calm and Carry On, was released on 16 November 2009. They decided on this name after seeing a poster in the White Horse pub in Richmond where they spent a lot of time whilst recording the album. The album's debut single was "Innocent". The second single from the album, "Could You Be the One?", was released on 15 February 2010. The band embarked on a seven-date tour to support the new album in March 2010 playing at Aberdeen, Newcastle, Glasgow, Nottingham, Birmingham, Manchester, Sheffield and London. with support from Glasgow band Hip Parade.

On 5 June 2010, Stereophonics played the first-ever gig at the Cardiff City Stadium with support from unsigned South Wales band 4th Street Traffic, followed by Kids in Glass Houses and Doves. The concert, known as "Summer in the City", was played to a sold-out audience of 30,000. Two days later, original drummer Stuart Cable was found dead in his home in Aberdare having choked on his own vomit after binge drinking. After the Keep Calm and Carry On Tour concluded, and their contract with Universal at an end, Kelly Jones wanted to change the way the band worked and so decided to take a break from writing and recording an album every two years.

=== More Drummer changes, Graffiti on the Train, Keep the Village Alive and Scream Above the Sounds (2011–2018) ===
On 3 March 2011, Stereophonics announced that they were working on new music in the studio. In July 2012 it was announced that Weyler and the band had parted company. It was announced on 24 September 2012 that Jamie Morrison, former drummer for Noisettes, had replaced Weyler in the band. On 8 October 2012, Stereophonics released the video to a track titled "Violins and Tambourines" from the upcoming album. On 4 November, the first single from the new album, "In a Moment", was released as a free download from the band's website. On the same day, NME.com reported that the album would be titled Graffiti on the Train. The album was released on 4 March 2013. Second single preceding the album, "Indian Summer" was released in January 2013; by 10 March it had peaked at number 30 in the UK, making it their group's first UK top-40 single since 2007. A third single, the album's title track, was released on 13 May.

In late September 2014, it was announced that a new album has been mixed and that it should be released in 2015. On 21 March 2015, Stereophonics performed in Bristol and in London's Royal Albert Hall and debuted 3 new songs "C'est La Vie", "I Wanna Get Lost With You" and "Song for the Summer" which are to be on their 9th album Keep the Village Alive with the release date of 11 September. "C'est la Vie" was released as the first single of the album. In September 2015 the band appeared on BBC Two's Later... with Jools Holland. During the Keep the Summer Alive Tour, Kelly Jones announced he would like to release the band's tenth studio album "before next summer" to commemorate the 20th anniversary of Word Gets Around, rather than release a compilation album.

On 27 July 2017 the band announced Scream Above the Sounds as the title for the album and will be released on 27 October 2017. It became available to pre-order on the same day. The album was released under the new distribution label "Parlophone", as the band parted ways with the old label V2. The band released "All In One Night" on the same day as the lead single from it. On 4 September 2017 "Caught By The Wind" was released as the second single from the album followed by "Before Anyone Knew Our Name" as the third single on 20 October 2017.They released the album's fourth and final single, "What's All the Fuss About?" on 4 December 2017. They embarked on the Scream Above The Sounds tour in 2018.

=== Kind and Oochya! (2019–2024) ===
In January 2019, Stereophonics announced two shows as part of Forest Live, the summer concert series promoted by the Forestry Commission: 13 June at Westonbirt Arboretum, near Tetbury, Gloucestershire and 23 June at Thetford Forest, near Brandon, Suffolk. Kind became their seventh number-one album later that year.

In March 2020 the band came under criticism from both the public and medical professionals for playing two gigs on the 14th and 15 March at the Cardiff's Motorpoint Arena while COVID-19 cases were steadily increasing in the UK. In the week prior to the event, a Six Nations match featuring Wales vs Scotland was cancelled due to COVID concerns, as was a Cardiff City football match versus Leeds United. The shows were the last major music event to take place in Wales, with the first COVID-19 lockdowns being implemented in England and Wales on March 23.

On November, Dave Roden, a sound engineer for the band, spoke publicly about the show. He claimed they had expected guidance from local authorities, or the police around the event, and that as the Welsh Government had stated that "cancelling mass gatherings was not required", the band decided to go ahead. In March 2024 the shows were highlighted during the UK COVID-19 Inquiry, with Baroness Hallett, who was leading the enquiry, stating that "You allow the mass event to go ahead, it gives the public the impression everything is fine."

Originally intending to release another greatest hits album, the band announced their twelfth album, Oochya! on 6 September 2021. It became their eighth number-one album. The band was due to play two gigs in December 2021, at Principality Stadium in Cardiff. However, these were postponed due to the omicron variant of COVID-19 spreading in Wales.

On 18 June 2022, the postponed concerts took place at the Principality Stadium, and was broadcast live on BBC One Wales and BBC Two, with special guest Sir Tom Jones.

=== Make 'Em Laugh, Make 'Em Cry, Make 'Em Wait (2024/25–present) ===
On 7 October 2024, the band announced a world tour, "Stadium Anthems Summer '25," to accompany their as-yet unnamed upcoming studio album. Tickets went on sale in the UK on 11 October, with subsequent venues being released gradually.

On 30 January 2025, the band announced their 13th studio album Make 'Em Laugh, Make 'Em Cry, Make 'Em Wait which would be released on 25 April. The same day, they released their first single from that album, "There's Always Gonna Be Something", which peaked at 100 on the UK Official Singles Downloads Chart.

== Other projects ==
On 9 October 2007, a retrospective DVD was released in the United States, Rewind: The First 10 Years. The DVD is a double disc with a runtime of nearly four hours. Much of this footage was recorded around the time that the You Gotta Go There to Come Back album was being recorded. This is because a similar band history DVD was listed for release shortly after that album but was never released, due to the departure of Stuart Cable. This explains Jones' hairstyle (circa 2003/2004) in the interview footage and the appearance of Stuart and the rest of the band freely talking about their togetherness and solidarity as the original three members. The original footage was updated by adding further footage to the end, bringing it up to date with the band's fifth album. Stuart does not appear on any of the extra footage. Availability coincides with the US re-release of the Language.Sex.Violence.Other? DVD, and the worldwide digital debut of their latest studio album, Pull the Pin.

In 2007, Jones released a solo album, titled Only the Names Have Been Changed, while recording the band's sixth studio album, Pull the Pin. The album contains ten tracks (all named after women) and features minimal instrumentation. The album also includes the song "Jayne", a previously unreleased Stereophonics track featured on the live album Live from Dakota and the Rewind DVD.

Stereophonics also performed the original opening theme tune for the TV series Long Way Round. The song's lyrics were slightly altered for the follow-up series, Long Way Down, Long Way Up, and Long Way Home.

== Members ==
Current members

- Kelly Jones – lead vocals, guitar, keyboards, piano (1992–present)
- Richard Jones – bass guitar, harmonica, backing vocals (1992–present)
- Adam Zindani – guitar, backing vocals (2007–present)
- Jamie Morrison – drums, percussion (2012–present)

Current touring musicians

- Tony Kirkham – keyboards, piano, harmonica, acoustic guitar, backing vocals (1999–present)
- Gavin Fitzjohn – saxophone, guitar (2018–present)

Former members

- Stuart Cable – drums, percussion (1992–2003; died 2010)
- Javier Weyler – drums, percussion, backing vocals (2004–2012)

Former touring musicians

- Scott James – guitar, backing vocals (2001–2004)
- Aileen McLaughlin – backing vocals (2002–2003)
- Anna Ross – backing vocals (2002–2003)
- Steve Gorman – drums, percussion (2003–2004)
- Sam Yapp – drums, percussion (2012)

== Discography ==
- Word Gets Around (1997)
- Performance and Cocktails (1999)
- Just Enough Education to Perform (2001)
- You Gotta Go There to Come Back (2003)
- Language. Sex. Violence. Other? (2005)
- Pull the Pin (2007)
- Keep Calm and Carry On (2009)
- Graffiti on the Train (2013)
- Keep the Village Alive (2015)
- Scream Above the Sounds (2017)
- Kind (2019)
- Oochya! (2022)
- Make 'Em Laugh, Make 'Em Cry, Make 'Em Wait (2025)
