= Javier Weyler =

Argentine-born drummer (born 1975)

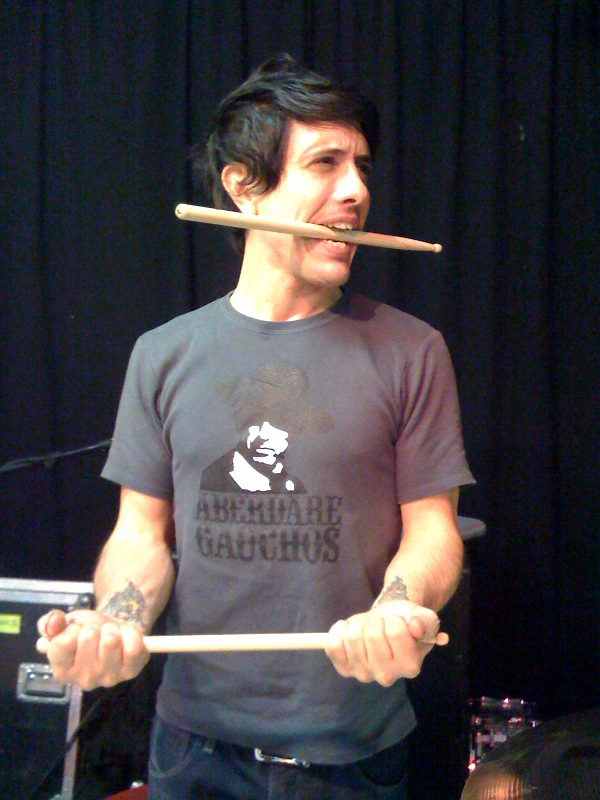
- Weyler before a show in 2010

Background information
- Born: Javier Andrés Weyler; 3 July 1975 (age 51); Buenos Aires, Argentina
- Genres: Rock; Britpop; latin; electronica
- Occupation: Musician
- Instrument: Drums
- Years active: 1992–present
- Labels: V2; Vox Populi; Black Beans Music
- Formerly of: Stereophonics
- Website: Official website

Javier Andrés Weyler (born 3 July 1975) is an Argentinian musician, best known as the drummer for Stereophonics from 2004 to 2012. He was the drummer in the Venezuelan band Claroscuro for over nine years until he left the country in 2001 to study audio engineering in London. In 2008 he released his first solo album, Lagrima, under the pseudonym of Capitan Melao.

== Career ==
Weyler was born in Buenos Aires, Argentina, before moving with his family to Caracas, Venezuela, where he learned music and developed his early career as a drummer.

=== 1992–2004: Claroscuro and audio engineering ===
Weyler was given his first drum kit at the age of thirteen by his father's band drummer and was taught how to play them by Venezuelan drummer Jose Mato. In January 1992, he set up his first band, Claroscuro, consisting of himself on drums, Carlos Eduardo Reyes on lead guitar and vocals, and Miguel Delgado on bass guitar. In February of the same year, they played their first gig in a venue named 'Dark Hole' in Caracas. At seventeen, he was already playing professionally in Venezuela and neighbouring countries with Claroscuro, releasing an EP and two albums with them. In March 1997, they became the first Venezuelan band to be in regular rotation on MTV, with the music video for their single "Mantarraya". In October 2001, he left the band to move to London to study audio engineering at the SAE Institute. He was subsequently replaced by Javier del Castillo on drums, with Claroscuro officially breaking up not long after in 2002. He then went on to work in several recording studios as an audio engineer/session drummer.

=== 2004–2012: Stereophonics and Capitan Melao ===
It was at one recording studio, where Weyler was working as an audio engineer in 2003 that he met Stereophonics whilst they were recording their fourth studio album (You Gotta Go There to Come Back) for which he played percussion and programmed drums. Weyler later met the band again when they were arrested at a party in Buenos Aires, aiding their release with his ability to speak Spanish. In April 2004, Weyler assisted in recording demos for Stereophonics' next studio album, and later on that year Kelly Jones and Richard Jones wrote to Weyler inviting him to drum permanently within the band as Stuart Cable's replacement. Weyler accepted the offer and met up with the rest of the band to make Stereophonics' fifth studio album Language. Sex. Violence. Other? (2005). He described learning the band's back catalogue ready for touring as "More challenging than difficult," and his favourite songs from the band's first four albums are "Local Boy in the Photograph", "The Bartender and the Thief" and "Mr. Writer".

Weyler recorded a solo album, Lagrima (meaning 'Tear'), under the persona of Capitan Melao, which was released on April 2, 2007. The project includes contributions from Phil Manzanera of Roxy Music and Natalia Lafourcade, with Weyler describing it as having "dreamy and poetic" lyrics and Latin rhythms. Weyler's alter-ego translates as 'Capitan' being Spanish for 'Captain' and 'Melao' Latin American slang for "swing, rhythm or soul".

In July 2012, it was announced that Weyler had left Stereophonics, ending an 8-year long collaboration. The band released a statement saying "Hi folks. We wanted to let you know Javier and the band will no longer be working together. The band enjoyed playing with Javier over the last 8 years and his company was enjoyed by everyone in the Stereophonics family. We wish Javier every success going forward in his new creative endeavours and personal life. (Filling in temporarily for Javier on these next shows will be our friend Sam). We look forward to seeing you at the shows." Weyler reflected on his departure in a 2024 interview with ZERO.NINE Magazine: "Even though it was my dream to play in a big successful band like that, there were a lot of things that weren't being fulfilled towards the end," he told. "I always have been very interested in the combination of music with images and motion picture, collaborating with other artists; or sound design. You need to keep challenging yourself if you want to grow and also bands are like relationships and sometimes you can grow apart."

Despite his departure, recordings featuring Weyler continued to be released on studio albums released after including; all of Graffiti on the Train, tracks featured on bonus track editions of Keep the Village Alive and Scream Above the Sounds and four tracks on Oochya!.

== Current equipment ==
- Slingerland Drums - 24x14" kick, 14x12" tom, 18x16" floor tom.
- Brady - 14x6½" block snare.
- Zildjian cymbals - 15" A rock hi-hats, 19" K Medium crash, 20" A Medium crash (x2), 22" A Medium ride & 20" 1970's pang.
- Slingerland hardware.
- Remo heads.
- Vater 5A sticks.
- DW 9000 pedal.

During the world tour to promote the release of Stereophonics' sixth album Pull the Pin Javier switched from Slingerland to using Ludwig Custom Maple drums out on the road (though he still uses his Slingerland in the studio). He uses a 22x14 bass drum, 14x10 tom, 16x16, and 18x16 floor toms, and a 14x61/2 Brady Jarrah block snare with all Ludwig hardware apart from a DW 9000 kick pedal and hi-hat stand. His cymbals are all Zildjian, with a 15" K/A hat mix, 22" K custom crash ride (x2), 22" K custom ride, and a prototype 21" A custom crash ride. He also uses Remo drumheads and Zildjian Super 5B sticks.

== Personal life ==
Weyler lives in London. He and his brother Pablo ran in the 2009 London Marathon in support of Cancer Research UK. In May 2010, he married his fiancée Laura. On 23 November 2012, their daughter Bianca Roxy was born.

== Discography ==
=== Studio albums ===
Date of release	Title	Record label
1995	El Viaje de una Vida (as part of Claroscuro)	Cygnus
2001	Supereterodino (as part of Claroscuro)	Claroscuro
14 March 2005	Language. Sex. Violence. Other? (as part of Stereophonics)	V2 Records
12 October 2007	Pull the Pin (as part of Stereophonics)	V2 Records
2 April 2007	Lagrima (as Capitan Melao)	Black Beans Music
16 November 2009	Keep Calm and Carry On (as part of Stereophonics)	V2 Records
4 February 2013	Cuatro Velas (El Yaque. Original Motion Picture Soundtrack)	Javier Weyler

=== EPs ===
Date of release	Title	Record label
1993	Claroscuro (as part of Claroscuro)	Claroscuro
