= Richard Jones (Stereophonics) =

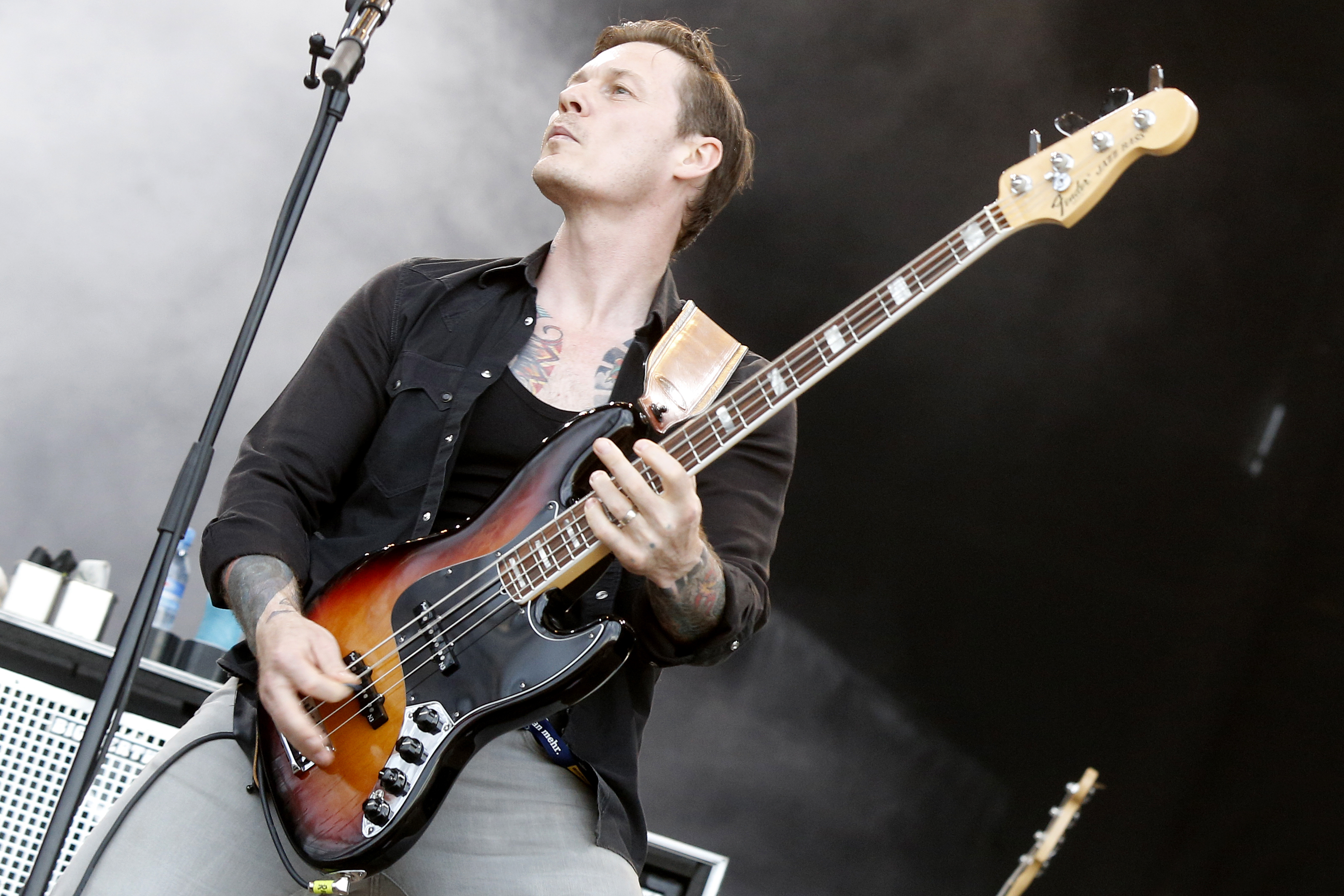

Background information
- Born: 23 May 1974 (age 52); Cwmaman, Wales
- Genres: Rock; alternative rock; post-Britpop
- Occupations: Musician; bassist; songwriter
- Instruments: Bass guitar; guitar; harmonica; piano
- Years active: 1992–present
- Label: Stylus Records
- Member of: Stereophonics
- Website: stereophonics.com

Richard Jones (born 23 May 1974) is a Welsh musician from Cwmaman, best known as the bassist for the rock band Stereophonics.

Jones grew up in Cwmaman, an old mining village in South Wales. He formed Stereophonics with Kelly Jones (no relation) and Stuart Cable, playing under the name "Tragic Love Company". Jones played to his largest audience on 2 July 2005 when the group appeared at the Live 8 concert, in Hyde Park, London.

Jones is often noted for his tattoos, and claims; "I got my first tattoo done in one of the Welsh Valleys when I was 16 or 17. By law you shouldn't have them before you're 18 but this tattooist bloke figured if you were old enough to walk in his shop, you were old enough to have them done. I wanted Jonesy tattooed on my arm but he spelt it wrong and put J-O-N-S-E-Y. I went back a few weeks later and asked for a big tattoo on my body but I hadn't got enough money, so instead he tattooed Richard on the side of my neck. I quite regret that one, actually." The 'Jonsey' tattoo on Jones' upper-right arm, among others, has since been covered up by Maori, Japanese and Tibetan designs across his arms and upper chest. He is an avid motorcycle enthusiast and has had multiple Ducati bikes.

== See also ==
- List of bass guitarists
- Stereophonics discography
