= Adam Zindani =

British musician (born 1972)

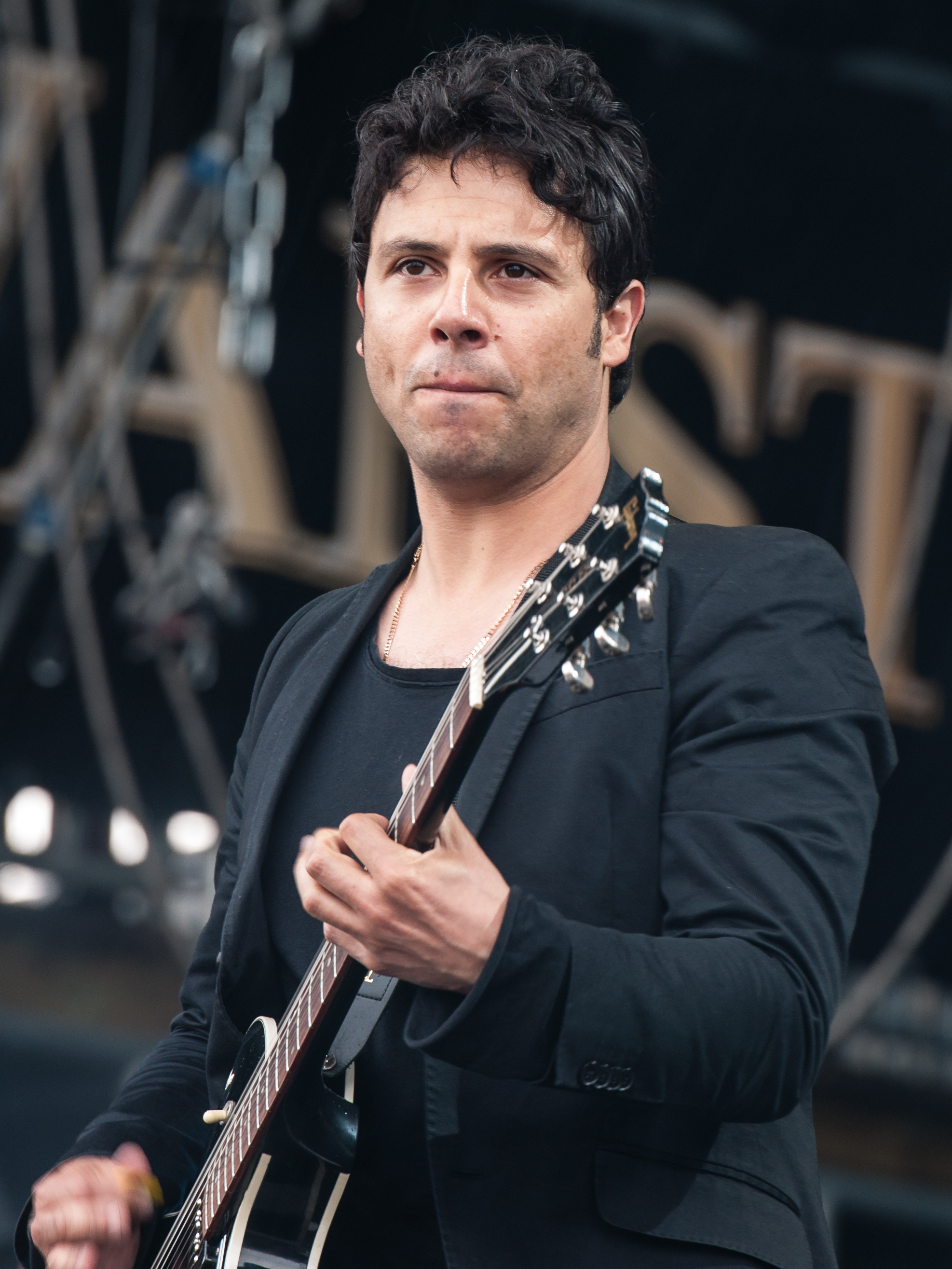
- Zindani in 2013

Background information
- Born: Adam Zindani; 5 March 1972 (age 54); Moseley, Birmingham, England
- Genres: Rock; britpop; pop
- Occupation: Musician
- Instrument: Guitar
- Member of: Stereophonics; Casino
- Website: Stereophonics Official; Casino MySpace

Adam Zindani (born 5 March 1972) is a British guitarist for the Welsh-based rock group Stereophonics, and the lead vocalist and rhythm guitarist for the Birmingham-based band Casino. His debut solo single, "What About Love", was released on 14 October 2022, and his debut album, Black Eyes Blue, was released 24 March 2023.

== Casino ==
The band were signed to Polydor Records in 2006 and changed their name to SpiderSimpson, after a character from a cult film. They recorded their debut album at Studio 606 in Los Angeles with record producer Nick Raskulinecz, but the record was rejected by Polydor.

In the autumn 2006 they completed the Kerrang! Radio Breakthrough Tour with other newly signed bands, followed by a UK tour in December. In May 2011, Zindani announced on Kerrang! Radio that Casino had signed a record deal and were going to release an album. This turned out to be 2009's The Spider Simpson Incident and was a re-recording of the rejected album, with added new songs, funded by Zindani's work with Stereophonics. In late 2012, the band released the singles "Runaway" and "Rise and Fall", followed by the release of the album Heavy Fever.

== Stereophonics ==
Zindani joined Stereophonics for their appearance at BBC Radio 1's Big Weekend in Preston on 20 May 2007. He continued to perform with the band for the remainder of the Pull the Pin Tour, playing lead guitar and backing vocals. He is credited for writing and performing on two of the band's tracks, "You're My Star" and "My Own Worst Enemy". In 2008 he was made a permanent member of the band.
