= Language. Sex. Violence. Other? (video) =

Video by Stereophonics
- Released: 31 July 2006
- Recorded: March 2004 – Winter 2005
- Genre: Rock; britpop
- Length: 100:00

Stereophonics chronology
The Stereophonics Collection (2005)	Language. Sex. Violence. Other? (2006)	Rewind (2007)

Language. Sex. Violence. Other? is a DVD released by the Welsh rock band Stereophonics. The DVD includes an in-depth documentary and personal footage from the band and co-producer Jim Lowe. It covers the journey of the band's fifth studio album of the same name, the addition of drummer Javier Weyler and finishes with ten tracks from the band's 2005 world tour featured on their live compilation, Live from Dakota.

Hot Press noted about the DVD, "the first 20 minutes in particular are a stream of fairly ineloquent snarling and many of the songs simply aren’t up to the task – strip away the production, as they did at their recent Whelan's live show, and it’s pretty much business as usual."

== Concert track listing ==
1. "Superman"
2. "Doorman"
3. "Madame Helga"
4. "Mr Writer"
5. "Local Boy in the Photograph"
6. "I'm Alright (You Gotta Go There To Come Back)"
7. "Maybe Tomorrow"
8. "Deadhead"
9. "Just Looking"
10. "Dakota"

== Videos ==
All four promo videos for the album Language. Sex. Violence. Other?

- "Dakota"
- "Superman"
- "Devil"
- "Rewind"
