= Live from Dakota =

Live album by Stereophonics
- Released: 3 April 2006
- Recorded: 2005
- Genre: Rock
- Length: 92:16
- Labels: Vox Populi; V2
- Producer: Kelly Jones

Stereophonics chronology
| Live from London EP (2005) | Live from Dakota (2006) | Pull the Pin (2007) |

Professional ratings
Aggregate scores
| Source | Rating |
|---|---|
| Metacritic | 58/100 |
Review scores
| Source | Rating |
| AllMusic | 3.5/5 stars |
| Delusions of Adequacy | 3.5/5 stars |
| NME | 6/10 |
| Now | 3.5/5 stars |
| PopMatters | 7/10 |
| Q | 2/5 stars |
| Uncut | 2/5 stars |

Live from Dakota is the first live album by Welsh rock band Stereophonics. It is a 2-disc compilation featuring 20 tracks spanning the first five of the band's albums and capturing the best of their 2005 world tour. Rather than being a recording of single show, every night of the tour was recorded and the band picked out the best version of each song individually. The album title is therefore not literal, but references the name of their first UK number-one single. In the UK, it was released on V2, whereas the American release was released on Vox Populi Records, the band's own imprint label. The album was rereleased on 13 April 2019 as part of Record Store Day.

== Track listing ==
All lyrics by Kelly Jones.

Disc 1
| No. | Title | Music | Length |
|---|---|---|---|
| 1. | "Superman" | Kelly Jones | 5:02 |
| 2. | "Doorman" | Kelly Jones | 4:01 |
| 3. | "A Thousand Trees" | Kelly Jones, Richard Jones, Stuart Cable | 3:26 |
| 4. | "Devil" | Kelly Jones | 4:47 |
| 5. | "Mr. Writer" | Kelly Jones, Marshall Bird | 5:32 |
| 6. | "Pedalpusher" | Kelly Jones | 3:21 |
| 7. | "Deadhead" | Kelly Jones | 3:17 |
| 8. | "Maybe Tomorrow" | Kelly Jones | 4:25 |
| 9. | "The Bartender and the Thief" | Kelly Jones, Richard Jones, Cable | 3:49 |
| 10. | "Local Boy in the Photograph" | Kelly Jones, Richard Jones, Cable | 4:04 |
| Total length: | | | 41:44 |

Disc 2
| No. | Title | Music | Length |
|---|---|---|---|
| 11. | "Hurry Up and Wait" | Kelly Jones, Richard Jones, Cable | 5:13 |
| 12. | "Madame Helga" | Kelly Jones | 3:51 |
| 13. | "Vegas Two Times" | Kelly Jones | 3:54 |
| 14. | "Carrot Cake and Wine" | Kelly Jones, Richard Jones, Cable | 4:49 |
| 15. | "I'm Alright (You Gotta Go There to Come Back)" | Kelly Jones | 5:11 |
| 16. | "Jayne" | Kelly Jones | 4:09 |
| 17. | "Too Many Sandwiches" | Kelly Jones, Richard Jones, Cable | 6:31 |
| 18. | "Traffic" | Kelly Jones, Richard Jones, Cable | 5:08 |
| 19. | "Just Looking" | Kelly Jones, Richard Jones, Cable | 5:19 |
| 20. | "Dakota" | Kelly Jones | 6:27 |
| Total length: | | | 50:32 |

== Personnel ==
Stereophonics

- Kelly Jones – vocals, guitar
- Richard Jones – bass guitar
- Javier Weyler – drums

Touring musicians

- Tony Kirkham – keyboard

Technical

- Recording – Steve McNichol
- Production – Kelly Jones, Jim Lowe
- Engineering – Steve McNichol
- Mixing – Jim Lowe, Stereophonics
- Mastering – Dick Beetham

== Charts and certifications ==
=== Charts ===
| Chart (2006) | Peak position |
|---|---|
| Belgian Albums Chart (Flanders) | 98 |
| French Albums Chart | 166 |
| Irish Albums Chart | 98 |
| UK Albums Chart | 13 |

=== Certifications ===
| Region | Certification | Certified units/sales |
|---|---|---|
| United Kingdom (BPI) | Gold | 100,000^{^} |
^{^} Shipments figures based on certification alone.
