= Language. Sex. Violence. Other? =

Studio album by Stereophonics
- Released: 14 March 2005
- Recorded: Late 2004 – Early 2005
- Studios: Sahara Sound, Fulham; The Stone Room, Shepherd's Bush; Hook End Manor, Checkendon
- Genres: Rock; Britpop
- Length: 43:24
- Label: V2
- Producers: Kelly Jones, Jim Lowe

Stereophonics chronology
You Gotta Go There to Come Back (2003)	Language. Sex. Violence. Other? (2005)	Pull the Pin (2007)

Singles from Language. Sex. Violence. Other?
- 1. "Dakota" Released: 28 February 2005; 2. "Superman" Released: 20 June 2005; 3. "Devil" Released: 19 September 2005; 4. "Rewind" Released: 21 November 2005

Language. Sex. Violence. Other? is the fifth studio album by alternative rock band Stereophonics. Produced by Kelly Jones and Jim Lowe, it was released on 14 March 2005 (22 March 2005 in the US) on V2 Records. After the band's two previous albums, which contained much more acoustic music and an overall mellower sound, the band brought back the harder and more abrasive alternative rock and indie rock sound they were known for and songs such as "Doorman" and "Brother" are some of the band's most aggressive songs. A new wave influence is also prevalent on the album.

Jones began writing the album while Stereophonics were on their You Gotta Go There to Come Back tour and recording sessions began in July 2004. It received positive reviews in the British music press, compared to their previous albums. The album reached number one in the UK, selling over 100,000 copies in its first week of release. It was the 37th biggest selling album of 2005 in the UK with over 500,000 copies sold. It debuted at thirty-five on the US Billboard Top Heatseekers albums chart.

The first single, "Dakota", was released on 28 February 2005. It became Stereophonics' biggest hit in the UK, reaching number one on the sales chart, and also topping the download chart, where it remained in the top ten for eleven weeks. The single received positive reviews, with James Masterton calling it the single of the year.

== Background and recording ==
"The album started the same way as every other album really. I do most of my writing on the road, on tour and then I just do a series of demos and see which ones work."

— Kelly Jones

The song "Deadhead" was previously released as a demo version under a different track name on the "Madame Helga" CD single as "Royal Flush". This is the second time to date the band have released a full finished version of a demo track from a CD single of a previous album campaign, in which "Nice to Be Out" from "Pick a Part That's New" was released two years later in 2001 on Just Enough Education to Perform.

The album started out while the band were touring for their previous album You Gotta Go There to Come Back. In March 2004, after Stereophonics had stopped touring, they went into the studio for eight days to develop new and further develop the ideas lead singer and guitarist Kelly Jones had come up with. The demo for "Dakota", which was originally named "Vermillion", was recorded in the one day Kelly and Jim Lowe were at The Stone Room in Shepherd's Bush. The next day the band went to their usual studio Sahara Sound in Fulham where Jones started working on "Superman" and managed to record a take of it. The band decided after recording these two demos that this sound was the direction the album would go in. After eight days in the studio they had fifteen song ideas for the album. "Lolita" was written as a tribute to celebrate the birth of Jones' daughter Lolita. Weyler, who had previously been the studio assistant for You Gotta Go There to Come Back, provided assistance for Language. Sex. Violence. Other? but was asked during studio sessions to provide drums for the demos instead of the drum machine they were using.

In July 2004, after the band stopped touring with David Bowie, they started recording sessions an Hook End Manor in Checkendon. Weyler was asked by Kelly Jones and Richard Jones to come record with them, the first time since the demo sessions. Kelly described him as "the man for the job" and when Weyler agreed, Kelly felt like Stereophonics were a proper band again. They started off jamming along to the tracks they were going to record for the album.

== Music ==
For Language. Sex. Violence. Other?, Jones's concept was to return the band to "a more modern sound", and described the album as a "very modern and angular record". MacKenzie Wilson of AllMusic described the album as punk rock-influenced, similar to their debut album Word Gets Around (1997), while Ian Cohen of Pitchfork felt the album "had some risible attempts at shoegazer and new wave" music; Adam Moerder of the same website shared similar sentiments, feeling the album tried to appeal to "today's new wave hipsters" and compared "Lolita" to shoegaze music, "Dakota" to New Order and the basslines from "Superman" and "Deadhead" to the Cure's song "A Forest".

== Release ==
=== Singles ===
Four singles were released from the album, the first two were given a CD, DVD and a 7-inch vinyl release while the last two were only given a CD and 7-inch vinyl release. While "Dakota" performed well in the charts, the other three singles did not perform as well and only peaked within the Top 20.

The first single, "Dakota", was released on 28 February 2005. The second single, "Superman", was released on 20 June 2005. The third single, "Devil", was released on 19 September 2005. The fourth single, "Rewind", was released on 21 November 2005. The recording sessions lasted from six-to-eight weeks according to Kelly.

=== Packing and title ===
"There was just a really, really creative week you know. That's where we came up with the idea to use the songs and give them one word titles and it was kind of the process of don't think just kinda draw you know and have some fun with it."

— Kelly Jones

The name of the album was taken from the BBFC consumer advice on the back of a James Dean DVD. The cover art was designed by Graham Rounthwaite. While the band and studio crew were decorating the Hook End Manor studio they came across some of Rounthwaite's artwork. Kelly approached him to create the album artwork and CD booklet art in the same style of the artwork the band had seen. Rounthwaite used the layering and colouring style of the "language, sex, violence, other" part of BBFC's consumer advice as the basis for the album artwork.

When he first heard "Dakota" (which was still called "Vermillion" at the time) it reminded him of the time he first heard Performance and Cocktails. He used the idea of a man and a woman kissing, with the woman not interested, from Performance and Cocktails' artwork to recreate this in his style but instead had the man not interested. An early version of this drawing had a bunny in the background which he was reluctant to have, until Kelly texted him saying, "Just lose the fucking bunny."

== Reception ==
=== Critical response ===
Professional ratings
Aggregate scores
Source	Rating
Metacritic	57/100
Review scores
Source	Rating
AllMusic	4/5 stars
Dotmusic	9/10
Drowned in Sound	3/10
The Guardian	3/5 stars
Mojo	3/5 stars
NME	7/10
Pitchfork	4.5/10
Q	3.5/5 stars
Rolling Stone	2/5 stars
RTÉ	1/5 stars

Language. Sex. Violence. Other? received generally mixed reviews. At Metacritic, which assigns a weighted average rating out of 100 to reviews from mainstream critics, the album received an average score of 57 based on 30 reviews. MacKenzie Wilson at AllMusic gave the album four stars out of five praising the replacement of Cable with Weyler as the new drummer and that they "could not have nailed it any better." NME, who were critical toward their previous two albums, praised the album with "its sparse artwork and one-word titles."

However, Drowned in Sound rated it three out of ten, writing: "Sure, there are radio-friendly, stadium rock moments aplenty. Yet, the chugging, plodding guitar riffs remain, new drummer Javier Weyler adds little value, and Jones is still straining away like Liam Gallagher having a dump. All this anchors 'Language...' firmly in the now familiar 'Phonics crowd pleasing pub rock territory."

== Track listing ==
All tracks are written by Kelly Jones.

No.	Title	Length
1.	"Superman"	5:07
2.	"Doorman"	3:49
3.	"Brother"	4:04
4.	"Devil"	4:40
5.	"Dakota"	4:57
6.	"Rewind"	4:46
7.	"Pedalpusher"	3:18
8.	"Girl"	1:59
9.	"Lolita"	3:26
10.	"Deadhead"	3:34
11.	"Feel"	3:44
Total length:		43:24

Japanese release bonus track
No.	Title	Length
12.	"Looks Like Chaplin" (live)

== Personnel ==
Stereophonics

- Kelly Jones – vocals, guitar, piano
- Richard Jones – bass guitar
- Javier Weyler – drums

Technical

- Production – Kelly Jones, Jim Lowe
- Engineering – Jim Lowe
- Mixing – Kelly Jones, Jim Lowe
- Mixing assistance – Brad Spence
- Mastering – Dick Beetham

== Charts and certifications ==
=== Charts ===
Album charts (weekly)
Chart (2005)	Peak position
Australian Albums (ARIA)	28
Austrian Albums (Ö3 Austria)	50
Belgian Albums (Ultratop Flanders)	35
Belgian Albums (Ultratop Wallonia)	97
Dutch Albums (Album Top 100)	30
French Albums (SNEP)	46
German Albums (Offizielle Top 100)	39
Irish Albums (IRMA)	1
Italian Albums (FIMI)	46
New Zealand Albums (RMNZ)	32
Scottish Albums (Official Charts)	1
Swiss Albums (Schweizer Hitparade)	34
UK Albums (Official Charts)	1
UK Independent Albums (Official Charts)	1
US Heatseekers Albums (Billboard)	35

Single charts (weekly)
Song	Peak						
Song	UK	UK Indie	AUS	BEL (WA)	IRE	NL	NZ
"Dakota"	1	1	22	18	8	74	20
"Superman"	13	—	—	—	19	—	—
"Devil"	11	—	—	—	—	—	—
"Rewind"	17	—	—	—	—	—	—

Album charts (year-end)
Chart (2005)	Position
UK Albums (OCC)	37

=== Certifications ===
Certifications for Language. Sex. Violence. Other?
Region	Certification	Certified units/sales
Ireland (IRMA)	Platinum	15,000^{^}
United Kingdom (BPI)	2× Platinum	600,000^{‡}
^{^} Shipments figures based on certification alone.^{‡} Sales+streaming figures based on certification alone.
