= Hungary for the Blues =

Live album by Chris Farlowe
- Released: November 8, 2005
- Recorded: June 18, 2000 (Gastroblues Festival Paks, Hungary) *Oct 8, 2004 (Charlys Musikkneipe, Oldenburg)
- Genre: Blues rock
- Length: 78:59
- Label: SPV Records
- Producer: György Gárdaí & Joc Konerding

Chris Farlowe chronology
Farlowe That! (2003)	Hungary for the Blues (2005)	At Rockpalast (2006)

Professional ratings
Review scores
Source	Rating
AllMusic	4/5 stars

Hungary for the Blues is the third live album by blues singer Chris Farlowe, released in 2006 (see 2006 in music).

This album is a recording of two performances by Farlowe. One was on June 18, 2000, at the Gastroblues Festival Paks, in Hungary, and other was on October 8, 2004, at the Charlys Musikkneipe, in Oldenburg.

== Track listing ==
1. "I Don't Want to Sing the Blues No More" (Chris Farlowe) -4:03
2. "Lonesome Road" (Roy Herrington) -6:26
3. "Stormy Monday" (T-Bone Walker) -8:09
4. "All or Nothing" (Steve Marriott, Ronnie Lane) -3:43
5. "Tough on Me, Tough on You" (Hoy Lindsey, Lonnie Mack) -6:33
6. "Shaky Ground" (Jeffrey Bowen, Al Boyd, Eddie Hazel) -6:45
7. "The Guitar Don't Lie" (Tony Joe White) -7:26
8. "I Think It's Gonna Rain Today" (Randy Newman) -1:47
9. "Easy as That" (Rickie Byrd) -5:16
10. "Out of Time" (Mick Jagger, Keith Richards) -4:39
11. "Who's Been Sleeping in My Bed" (Glenn Frey) -3:40
12. "Miss You Fever" (Dennis Morgan, Feargal Sharkey) -6:39
  - Tracks 1–12 recorded at Gastroblues Festival Paks (June 18, 2000)
13. "Handbags and Gladrags" (Mike d'Abo) -6:46
14. "Rock N' Roll Soldier" (Troy Seals) -7:00
  - Tracks 13–14 recorded at Charlys Musikkneipe (October 8, 2004)

== Personnel ==
- Chris Farlowe – vocals
- Norman Beaker – guitars, backing vocals
- John Price – bass guitar, backing vocals
- Andy Kingslow – keyboards, organ, piano (2004)
- Dave Baldwin – keyboards, organ, piano
- Paul Burgess – drums, percussion
- Damian Hand – saxophones (2004)
- Lenni – saxophones (2000)
