= Ride On, Baby =

1967 song by The Rolling Stones

Song by the Rolling Stones

from the album Flowers
- Released: June 1967
- Recorded: 4 December 1965
- Genre: Baroque pop
- Label: London (US)
- Songwriter: Jagger/Richards
- Producer: Andrew Loog Oldham

"Ride On, Baby" is a song by English rock band the Rolling Stones. It was written by Mick Jagger and Keith Richards in 1965. It was first released as a single by Chris Farlowe in October 1966 and reached No. 31 on the British charts. The Rolling Stones' own version appeared a few months later on Flowers, an album released only in the US in June 1967. It was recorded during the Aftermath sessions in December 1965.

== Personnel ==
According to authors Philippe Margotin and Jean-Michel Guesdon, except where noted:

The Rolling Stones

- Mick Jagger – vocals
- Keith Richards – backing vocals, electric guitar
- Brian Jones – marimba
- Bill Wyman – bass
- Charlie Watts – drums, bongos

Additional musician

- Jack Nitzsche – harpsichord, piano

== Chris Farlowe version ==
"Ride On, Baby"

Single by Chris Farlowe

from the album The Art of Chris Farlowe
- B-side: "Headlines"
- Released: 27 October 1966
- Recorded: 1966
- Genre: Baroque pop, soul
- Length: 3:10
- Label: Immediate
- Songwriter: Jagger/Richards
- Producer: Mick Jagger

Chris Farlowe singles chronology
"Out of Time" (1966)	"Ride On, Baby" (1966)	"My Way of Giving" (1967)

British singer Chris Farlowe recorded a version of "Ride On, Baby", produced by Mick Jagger, which was released in October 1966, almost 9 months before the Rolling Stones version. Despite the success of its predecessor "Out of Time", which reached number one, "Ride On Baby" did not even breach the top twenty, peaking at number 31 for two weeks in late 1966. It became his penultimate single release to reach the top 40, the later being "Handbags and Gladrags" in 1967. The track is included on his album The Art of Chris Farlowe.

Perhaps the song wasn't issued in the U.K. because it might have been being saved for Chris Farlowe, who covered a bunch of Rolling Stones songs on his singles and put "Ride On, Baby" on the A-side of a British 45 in October 1966, with Mick Jagger producing. Predictably, it was inferior to the Rolling Stones' version, with a poppier orchestral arrangement, a stop-start tempo not present in the Stones' arrangement in the verse, backup female singers, and a more strained vocal, though it did reach number 31 in the British charts.

— Richie Unterberger, Ride On, Baby AllMusic review
