= The Art of Chris Farlowe =

Studio album by Chris Farlowe
- Released: 25 November 1966 (LP); 25 January 1992 (CD)
- Recorded: October 1966
- Studio: Pye Studios, London
- Genre: Blue-eyed soul, rhythm and blues
- Length: 45:46
- Label: Immediate
- Producer: Andrew Loog Oldham, Mick Jagger

Chris Farlowe chronology
14 Things to Think About (1966)	The Art of Chris Farlowe (1966)	The Last Goodbye (1969)

Professional ratings
Review scores
Source	Rating
AllMusic	3.5/5 stars

The Art of Chris Farlowe is the third 1966 album by British singer Chris Farlowe, featuring his band the Thunderbirds, but only credited to him.

Andrew Loog Oldham produced the recording sessions with Mick Jagger. The album includes four songs composed by Jagger along with Keith Richards. The album was reissued in 1992, featuring 11 bonus tracks.

== Details ==
Released in 1966 on the Immediate Records label, the album was produced by Andrew Loog Oldham and Mick Jagger who wrote, with Keith Richards, four of the fourteen songs on the album. Then it was reissued in 1992 with eleven bonus tracks. The album charted on its release at number 37 in the UK album chart. The group is made up of musicians who would go on to leave their mark in history, such as guitarist Albert Lee who would later play with Heads Hands & Feet, Emmylou Harris and Bill Wyman's Rhythm Kings, keyboardist Pete Solley, who first played with Arthur Brown and later formed the progressive rock band Paladin before joining Whitesnake. The drummer Carl Palmer who, after this experience with The Thunderbirds, will join the ranks of the Crazy World of Arthur Brown then will go to found the trio Atomic Rooster with the keyboardist Vincent Crane, and then Emerson, Lake & Palmer. Jimmy Page also participated by playing guitar on the song Paint it Black. Drummer Andy White who plays on one of the songs on the album, Out of Time, is also known for playing on the first single of Beatles, Love Me Do in 1963. In addition to the production, Mick Jagger collaborated in backing vocals.

The songs written by Mick Jagger and Keith Richards are, in order, Paint it Black, Out of Time, I'm Free and Ride on, Baby. And there is also a song by Jerry Butler and Otis Redding, I've Been Loving You Too Long as well as the classic from the songwriters Holland-Dozier-Holland, Reach Out I'll Be There.

== Track listing ==
=== Side one ===
1. "What Becomes of the Broken Hearted" (James Dean, Paul Riser, William Weatherspoon) - 2:40
2. "We're Doing Fine" (Horace Ott) - 2:38
3. "Life Is But Nothing" (Andrew Rose, Dave Skinner) - 4:06
4. "Paint It, Black" (Mick Jagger, Keith Richards) - 3:01
5. "Cuttin' In" (Johnny Watson) - 2:59
6. "Open the Door to Your Heart" (Darrell Banks) - 2:34
7. "Out of Time" (Mick Jagger, Keith Richards) - 3:24

=== Side two ===
1. "North South East West" (Chris Farlowe, Albert Lee) - 3:54
2. "You're So Good For Me" (Charles Bell, Andrew Loog Oldham, Andrew Rose, Dave Skinner) - 2:15
3. "It Was Easier to Hurt Her" (Jerry Ragovoy, Bert Russell) - 3:45
4. "I'm Free" (Mick Jagger, Keith Richards) - 2:23
5. "I've Been Loving You Too Long" (Jerry Butler, Otis Redding) - 3:00
6. "Reach Out (I'll Be There)" (Lamont Dozier, Eddie Holland) - 3:15
7. "Ride On, Baby" (Mick Jagger, Keith Richards) - 2:55

== Additional tracks on 1992 re-issue ==
1. "Yesterday's Papers" (Mick Jagger, Keith Richards) - 2:44
2. "Moanin'" (Bobby Timmons, Jon Hendricks) - 2:31
3. "What Have I Been Doing" (Fred Alcock, Stephen Crane) - 3:55
4. "Handbags and Gladrags" (Mike d'Abo) - 3:59
5. "Everybody Makes a Mistake" (Fred Alcock, Stephen Crane) - 2:03
6. "The Last Goodbye" (Mike d'Abo) - 2:48
7. "Paperman Fly in the Sky" (Fred Alcock, Stephen Crane) - 2:48
8. "I Just Need Your Lovin'" (Fred Alcock, Stephen Crane) - 3:11
9. "Dawn" (Bruce Waddell, Steve Hammond) - 3:50
10. "April Was the Month" (Fred Alcock, Stephen Crane) - 3:50
11. "Moanin'" - without sitar (Bobby Timmons, Jon Hendricks) - 2:29

== Personnel ==
- Chris Farlowe - vocals
- Albert Lee - guitars, vocals
- Ricky Chapman - bass guitar, acoustic guitar, vocals
- Pete Solley - Hammond organ, piano, electric piano, vocals
- Carl Palmer - drums, percussion

as guests

- Mick Jagger - backing vocals
- Jimmy Page - guitar on "Paint It Black".
- Andy White - drums, percussion on "Out of Time"

Production

- Mick Jagger - producer
- Glyn Johns - engineer
- Alan Florence - engineer
- George "Irish" Chkiantz - engineer
- Arthur Greenslade - string arrangements, conductor
- Diana Warburton - cover painting
- Stephen Ingles - sleeve design
