= Rewind (Stereophonics song) =

Single by Stereophonics

from the album Language. Sex. Violence. Other?
- B-side: "Hammerhead"
- Released: 21 November 2005
- Length: 4:46
- Label: V2
- Songwriter(s): Kelly Jones
- Producer(s): Kelly Jones; Jim Lowe

Stereophonics singles chronology
"Devil" (2005)	"Rewind" (2005)	"Bank Holiday Monday" (2007)

Music video
- "Rewind" on YouTube

"Rewind" is the fourth single from Welsh rock band Stereophonics' fifth album, Language. Sex. Violence. Other? (2005). It was released in November 2005 and reached number 17 on the UK Singles Chart.

== Music video ==
The Music video picks up where the video for 'Devil' left off, with singer Kelly being let out of the trunk of his kidnappers' car. It is revealed to be a set, and the car is simply driving along in front of a moving screen. Kelly then walks on a treadmill in a studio made up of sets from the previous videos of "Dakota", "Superman" and "Devil".

== Track listings ==
CD1

1. "Rewind"
2. "Hammerhead"

CD2

1. "Rewind"
2. "Ooh La La" (Goldfrapp cover from Live Lounge with Jo Whiley on Radio 1)
3. "Maybe Tomorrow" (live)

7-inch

1. "Rewind"
2. "Superman" (MHC remix)

== Charts ==
Chart (2005)	Peak position
Scotland (OCC)	16
UK Singles (OCC)	17
UK Indie (OCC)	1
