= Pull the Pin =

Studio album by Stereophonics
- Released: 12 October 2007
- Recorded: December 2006–August 2007
- Studios: Grouse Lodge, Ireland Real World Studios, England Eden Studios, England
- Genres: Rock; post-grunge
- Length: 46:25
- Label: V2
- Producers: Kelly Jones; Jim Lowe

Stereophonics chronology
Language. Sex. Violence. Other? (2005)	Pull the Pin (2007)	Decade in the Sun: Best of Stereophonics (2008)

Singles from Pull the Pin
- 1. "It Means Nothing" Released: 24 September 2007; 2. "My Friends" Released: 3 December 2007; 3. "Stone" Released: 3 March 2008

Pull the Pin is the sixth studio album by Welsh rock band Stereophonics, released by V2 in the UK on 12 October 2007. A Stereophonics newsletter released the Pull the Pin album artwork to subscribers. The cover was also shown to Myspace users that had added the band in a bulletin.

The taster track "Bank Holiday Monday" had its world premier on Radio 1's Chris Moyles Show on Tuesday 1 May 2007 and was made available for digital download on Monday 28 May 2007 from online retailers. The album became a critical and commercial low-point for Stereophonics, receiving negative reviews and—at the time—having the lowest sales figures of their career. Despite this Pull the Pin still managed to reach number one on the UK Albums Chart; however, it was their last until Keep the Village Alive almost eight years later in 2015.

== Writing ==
Lead singer Kelly Jones had to take ten months off before commencing to write songs for the album due to an illness in his family. About two years prior to the release of Pull the Pin, he had written the lyrics for "It Means Nothing" and "Daisy Lane" in a hotel in Germany—the latter was written for Language. Sex. Violence. Other? (2005) but it wasn't completed during that time.

"It Means Nothing" was written based on the 7/7 London attacks, it is about the feeling of unease in the city and people realising what was important in their lives. "Daisy Lane" is about a young boy who was stabbed to death on the street where Jones lives. The song "Stone" contains lyrics which were also featured in their earlier single "Moviestar", namely: "You're in my soul / You're in my mind". It was considered for the album's lead single but the band and record company decided for "It Means Nothing" instead.

== Release ==
"Bank Holiday Monday" was made available to download on 28 May 2007 to those who purchased tickets for the band's tour in November 2007. Pull The Pin was released on 12 October 2007 on three formats, including CD, digital and LP.

=== Packing and title ===
The artwork of the two lips was designed by Miles Aldridge while Graham Rounthwaite and Stereophonics handled the art direction. The band photographs inside the CD booklet were taken by Hans Peter van Velthoven. The title and cover art of Pull the Pin was negatively received. When reviewing the album, Ian Cohen from Pitchfork called them "awful" while Drowned in Sound contributor Cpt Howling Mad Murdock called the cover art "some of the worst artwork of the year." Sonja D'Cruze at the BBC also disliked the artwork, commenting, "And that's not to mention the distasteful artwork of two sets of psychedelic glossed-up lips pulling a grenade pin."

=== Singles ===
The band's newsletter on 24 July 2007 confirmed details and artwork of the first single to be released from the album. "It Means Nothing" was released as the first single from the album in digital form on 24 September 2007 and later on 1 October three major versions were released, including one CD single and two vinyl singles. It charted at number twelve in the UK Singles chart, making it the first lead single to miss out on the top five since "Local Boy in the Photograph". "My Friends" was released as the second single on 10 December 2007 on three formats, CD, 7" vinyl and USB, and charted at number thirty-two on the UK charts.

== Reception ==
=== Critical response ===
Professional ratings
Aggregate scores
Source	Rating
Metacritic	46/100
Review scores
Source	Rating
AllMusic	2.5/5 stars
Drowned in Sound	4/10
The Guardian	2/5 stars
Hot Press	1.5/5 stars
The Independent	2/5 stars
Mojo	3/5 stars
NME	7/10
Pitchfork	3.4/10
The Skinny	2/5 stars
Uncut	3/5 stars

Pull the Pin received generally mixed to negative reviews. At Metacritic, which assigns a normalized rating out of 100 to reviews from mainstream critics, the album has received an average score of 46, based on 12 reviews. Contrasting with the negative reviews however, NME – who had been critical of the band's previous albums – contributor Paul McNamee praised the album, stating it lives up as a successor album to Language. Sex. Violence. Other? and summarised it as "an unapologetic rock'n'roll record by a band who are hard to like but impossible to ignore."

In the negative, Sonja D'Cruze from the BBC summarised the album as having "no real depth, imagination or anything to connect with". Dorian Lynskey of The Guardian criticised the album, saying "the only things worse than Kelly Jones's aggrieved bellow and flatpack songwriting are his lyrics" and compared them to someone "performing brain surgery in boxing gloves: the patient always dies". Pitchfork contributor Ian Cohen also criticised Jones' lyrical content and said the rock genre of the album was different by having "no sex, no spark". Cpt H.M. 'Howling Mad' Murdock from Drowned in Sound was negative toward Jones' vocals by calling them "least-sincere" and compared them to "as if a diseased cat’s being garrotted in his throat". He summarised the album as "absolutely without spark and wholly forgettable".

=== Commercial performance ===
The album reached number one in the UK, becoming the band's fifth consecutive studio album to do so. Despite this, record sales were at an all-time low for the band, receiving only a gold certification (Note: All the band's previous studio albums have been certified at least platinum.) for sales over 200,000 copies. The album didn't fare well outside of the UK either. In Ireland the record reached number fifteen, breaking the band's three number-one albums streak.

== Track listing ==
All tracks are written by Kelly Jones; "I Could Lose Ya" co-written by Richard Jones and Javier Weyler

No.	Title	Length
1.	"Soldiers Make Good Targets"	4:37
2.	"Pass the Buck"	3:24
3.	"It Means Nothing"	3:48
4.	"Bank Holiday Monday"	3:14
5.	"Daisy Lane"	3:37
6.	"Stone"	4:17
7.	"My Friends"	3:35
8.	"I Could Lose Ya"	3:17
9.	"Bright Red Star"	3:39
10.	"Ladyluck"	3:45
11.	"Crush"	3:56
12.	"Drowning"	5:08
Total length:		46:25

Japanese release bonus tracks
No.	Title	Length
13.	"Hangman"	2:48
14.	"Helter Skelter" (Beatles cover)	4:19
15.	"Have a Nice Day"	3:26

== Personnel ==
Stereophonics

- Kelly Jones – vocals, guitar
- Richard Jones – bass guitar
- Javier Weyler – drums

Technical

- Production – Kelly Jones, Jim Lowe
- Engineering – Lowe
- Mixing – Mark 'Spike' Stent
- Studio assistants – Dario Dendi, Alex Dromgoole, Marco Migliari, Rowen Rossiter
- Mastering – Ted Jensen

== Charts and certifications ==
=== Charts ===
Chart performance for Pull the Pin
Chart (2007)	Peak position
Australian Albums (ARIA)	68
Belgium Albums Chart (Flanders)	62
Belgium Albums Chart (Wallonia)	98
Dutch Albums Chart	46
French Albums Chart	30
Irish Albums Chart	15
Italian Albums Chart	81
New Zealand Albums Chart	38
Swiss Albums Chart	40
UK Albums Chart	1

=== Certifications ===
Certifications for Pull the Pin
Region	Certification	Certified units/sales
Ireland (IRMA)	Gold	7,500^{^}
United Kingdom (BPI)	Gold	200,000
^{^} Shipments figures based on certification alone.
