= I Wouldn't Believe Your Radio =

1999 single by Stereophonics

Single by Stereophonics

from the album Performance and Cocktails
- B-side: "The Old Laughing Lady"; "T-Shirt Suntan" (live)
- Written: August 1997
- Released: 23 August 1999
- Studio: Real World (Bath, Somerset, England)
- Length: 3:50 (album version); 3:43 (single version)
- Label: V2
- Composers: Kelly Jones; Richard Jones; Stuart Cable
- Lyricist: Kelly Jones
- Producers: Bird & Bush

Stereophonics singles chronology
"Pick a Part That's New" (1999)	"I Wouldn't Believe Your Radio" (1999)	"Hurry Up and Wait" (1999)

Music video
- "I Wouldn't Believe Your Radio" on YouTube

"I Wouldn't Believe Your Radio" is the fourth single released from Welsh rock band Stereophonics' second studio album, Performance and Cocktails (1999), on which the song appears as the seventh track. The single was released in August 1999 and reached number 11 on the UK Singles Chart. A live version from Morfa Stadium is present on CD2 of the single. A version with Stuart Cable singing vocals can be found on CD1 on the "Hurry Up and Wait" single.

== Background ==
In the album booklet for Performance and Cocktails, vocalist Kelly Jones revealed that he wrote the song in August 1997 after waking up from a dream. In the dream, George Harrison and Ringo Starr of the Beatles were singing "I Wouldn't Believe Your Radio" in front of Jones' parents' house. Jones also said that he originally wanted drummer Stuart Cable to sing the track so they could "keep the Ringo theme going".

== Music video ==
The video was inspired as an homage to the cult 1969 road film Easy Rider. It shows the band as characters from the film, making a road trip through America on motorbikes.

== Track listings ==
UK CD1

1. "I Wouldn't Believe Your Radio" (single version)
2. "The Bartender and the Thief" (bar version)
3. "The Old Laughing Lady"

UK CD2

1. "I Wouldn't Believe Your Radio" (live at Morfa Stadium)
2. "Pick a Part That's New" (live at Morfa Stadium)
3. "T-Shirt Suntan" (live at Morfa Stadium)

UK 7-inch and cassette single

1. "I Wouldn't Believe Your Radio" (single version)
2. "The Bartender and the Thief" (bar version)

Japanese CD single

1. "I Wouldn't Believe Your Radio" (single version)
2. "The Bartender and the Thief" (bar version)
3. "Sunny Afternoon"
4. "Positively 4th Street"
5. "Tie Me Up, Tie Me Down"

== Credits and personnel ==
Credits are taken from the Performance and Cocktails album booklet.

Recording

- Written in August 1997
- Recorded at Real World (Bath, Somerset, England)
- Mastered at Metropolis (London, England)

Personnel

- Kelly Jones – music, lyrics, vocals, guitar
- Richard Jones – music, bass
- Stuart Cable – music, drums
- Marshall Bird – keyboards
- Bird & Bush – production
- Al Clay – mixing
- Ian Cooper – mastering

== Charts ==
Chart (1999)	Peak position
Europe (Eurochart Hot 100)	40
Scotland Singles (OCC)	7
UK Singles (OCC)	11
UK Indie (OCC)	2

== Certifications ==
Region	Certification	Certified units/sales
United Kingdom (BPI)	Silver	200,000^{‡}
^{‡} Sales+streaming figures based on certification alone.

== Release history ==
Region	Date	Format(s)	Label(s)	Ref.
United Kingdom	23 August 1999	CD; cassette	V2	
United Kingdom	6 September 1999	7-inch vinyl	V2	
Japan	8 September 1999	CD	V2	
