= You Gotta Go There to Come Back =

Studio album by Stereophonics
- Released: 2 June 2003
- Recorded: January–December 2002
- Studios: Hook End Manor (Checkendon); Abbey Road (London); BJG/Sahara Sound, (Fulham)
- Genres: Rock; blues rock
- Length: 59:12
- Label: V2
- Producer: Kelly Jones

Stereophonics chronology
Just Enough Education to Perform (2001)	You Gotta Go There to Come Back (2003)	Language. Sex. Violence. Other? (2005)

Singles from You Gotta Go There to Come Back
- 1. "Madame Helga" Released: 19 May 2003; 2. "Maybe Tomorrow" Released: 21 July 2003; 3. "Since I Told You It's Over" Released: 10 November 2003; 4. "Moviestar" Released: 9 February 2004

You Gotta Go There to Come Back is the fourth studio album by alternative rock band Stereophonics. Produced by Kelly Jones and released on V2 in 2003, this LP became their third consecutive album to top the UK chart, selling 101,946 copies in its first week alone. It is the final Stereophonics album to feature long-time original drummer Stuart Cable before he was fired in September 2003. The album’s title comes from the eighth track "I'm Alright (You Gotta Go There to Come Back)".

== Recording ==
Kelly Jones produced the album himself, working fast in hoping to capture the "vibe" of the band's concerts; "I wanted to create a record that was very raw, very spontaneous but had loads of detail and textures and layers," Jones noted, "We pushed ourselves in many places we've never been before." He later recalled that recording the album was, for many years, the best recording experience the band ever had, saying: "All the crew were in the room, all the girlfriends were in the room, all the band were there, it was the best recording session ever. It just felt like a fucking really good time."

== Musical and lyrical style ==
You Gotta Go There to Come Back features a blues rock-styled sound in the mold of early 1970s rock bands, and also displays influences of garage rock and soul. Kelly Jones described the album, with its "very 70s, Stevie Wonder, rock overdub feel", as the fulfillment of his desire to make an album like his favourite soul music: "I was really into soul music - it's not something I'm ashamed about. I was brought up on Stevie Wonder and I love Talking Book and all the overdubs on it, and all that freestyling Marvin Gaye thing. I'd always wanted to make a record like that, and this was the first one I produced so that's probably why I went 'Fuck it I'm just going to do it'." The NME felt that the album's "retro-garage" style made it "accidentally hip," comparing it to acclaimed contemporary garage rock revival "headbanger blues" bands like the White Stripes, a sentiment also shared by music critic Neil McCormick.

Throughout the album there are "different moods and changes." Jones stated: "Every few bars, when your brain's saying, 'Have you heard that now', I wanted to put something new in there." He felt this set the album apart from most other contemporary albums, which he felt "sound like one song from beginning to end." Jack Smith of the BBC detected influences from AC/DC, Stevie Wonder, the Isley Brothers and Creedence Clearwater Revival. The album also sporadically features "ornate strings reminiscent of Chris Farlowe's British soul in the 1960s." Jones' emotional lyrics for the albums draw on his break-up with his girlfriend of 12 years, and one critic noted how Jones' "life unfolds through words" on the album. Jones said of the lyrics:

"The songwriting has changed because as a person you change. It's been an emotional rollercoaster these last two years, whether it be divorce, sex, drink, drugs, arguments, whatever it might be, I can only write about what I'm experiencing. Life is about making mistakes and learning from them, learning about yourself and becoming a better person. That's what the title of the album basically means."

The opening song, "Help Me (She's Out of Her Mind)", has been described as "easy funk", and comparisons were drawn between Jones' vocals on the song and John Lennon's "Cold Turkey" vocals. Jason MacNeil of PopMatters compared the "moody, murky blues rock" song to Southern soul, while describing "Maybe Tomorrow" as "English soul." Lead single "Madame Helga" has been described as gospel and glam metal, with "dirty guitars duplicating a funky brass section." The acoustic, country-styled "Climbing the Wall" features horn and string sections and a Southern rock guitar solo, while the "pseudo-experimentalism" of "I'm Alright (You Gotta Go There to Come Back)" features looped drums and a piano. The quieter "Rainbows and Pots of Gold" has soul influences and concerns "a friend who stole [Jones'] girl."

== Reception ==
Professional ratings
Aggregate scores
Source	Rating
Metacritic	60/100
Review scores
Source	Rating
AllMusic	3/5 stars
Entertainment Weekly	B
Dotmusic	7/10
The Guardian	2/5 stars
Mojo	2/5 stars
NME	6/10
PopMatters	8/10
Q	3/5 stars
Uncut	2/5 stars
Under the Radar	3/5 stars

=== Critical response ===
You Gotta Go There to Come Back received generally mixed reviews. At Metacritic, which assigns a weighted average rating out of 100 to reviews from mainstream critics, the album received an average score of 60 based on 10 reviews.

=== Commercial performance ===
You Gotta Go There to Come Back joined its predecessors at #1 on release. It was re-issued with bonus tracks in February 2004, coming into the UK charts again at #35, finally re-entering at #16 in September 2004. It was the 28th biggest selling album of 2003 in the UK. The track "Maybe Tomorrow" became one of their biggest hits; it was played over the credits of the Academy Award-winning movie Crash (2004) and also during the opening scene of the film Wicker Park (2004). It was also used in a season one episode of One Tree Hill and featured on the first Charmed soundtrack.

== Track listing ==
All tracks are written by Kelly Jones

No.	Title	Length
1.	"Help Me (She's Out of Her Mind)"	6:55
2.	"Maybe Tomorrow"	4:33
3.	"Madame Helga"	3:55
4.	"You Stole My Money Honey"	4:18
5.	"Getaway"	4:08
6.	"Climbing the Wall"	4:55
7.	"Jealousy"	4:26
8.	"I'm Alright (You Gotta Go There to Come Back)"	4:36
9.	"Nothing Precious at All"	4:20
10.	"Rainbows and Pots of Gold"	4:11
11.	"I Miss You Now"	4:50
12.	"High as the Ceiling"	3:19
13.	"Since I Told You It's Over"	4:43
Total length:		59:12

Japanese release bonus track
No.	Title	Length
14.	"Lying to Myself Again"	3:50

=== Bonus tracks ===
The track "Moviestar" appears on later editions of the album as track 4 and was released with a DVD containing the videos for the singles.

=== Vinyl editions ===
The album was released in gatefold sleeve at first, containing two records. When "Moviestar" was included on the album the gatefold sleeve contained three records.

== Personnel ==
Stereophonics

- Kelly Jones – lead vocals, guitar, keyboards, harmonica, Clavinet, Fender Rhodes, Mellotron, Wurlitzer
- Richard Jones – bass guitar, harmonica
- Stuart Cable – drums, percussion

Technical

- Production – Kelly Jones, Jim Lowe
- Engineering – Andy Burden, Jim Lowe, Steve McNichol, Chris Steffenl, Brian Vibberts
- Mixing – Kelly Jones, Jim Lowe, Jack Joseph Puig
- Mastering – Dick Beetham, Chris Blair
- Digital editing – Steve McNichol
- Studio assistants – Chris Bolster, Andy Davies, Max Dingle, Javier Weyler

Additional

- Tony Kirkham – mellotron, piano, clavinet, Hammond organ, Fender Rhodes, Wurlitzer organ
- Javier Weyler – hand clapping, percussion
- Jim Lowe – mellotron, piano
- Stephen Papworth – hand clapping, kettle drums, percussion
- Paul Spong – cornet, flugelhorn
- Backing vocalists – Angie Brown, Sam Brown, Sam Leigh Brown, Melanie Marcus, Aileen McLaughlin, Anna Ross

Orchestra

- Strings – Mark Berrow, Rachel Bolt, Ben Chappell, Gustav Clarkson, David Daniel, David Daniels, Patrick Kiernan, Boguslaw Kostecki, Peter Lale, Paddy Lannigan, Julian Leaper, Rita Manning, Perry Mason, Anthony Pleeth, Mary Scully, Katherine Shave, Chris Tobling, Bruce White, Gavyn Wright, Naomi Wright
- Alto Sax – Steve Hamilton
- Cornet and flugelhorn – Paul Spong
- Tenor sax – Andy Hamilton
- Trombone – Neil Sidwell
- Trumpet – Sid Gauld

== Charts ==
=== Weekly charts ===
Chart (2003)	Peak position
Australian Albums (ARIA)	50
Dutch Albums (Album Top 100)	32
French Albums (SNEP)	42
German Albums (Offizielle Top 100)	60
Irish Albums (IRMA)	1
Italian Albums (FIMI)	31
New Zealand Albums (RMNZ)	18
Scottish Albums (Official Charts)	1
Swiss Albums (Schweizer Hitparade)	39
UK Albums (Official Charts)	1
US Heatseekers Albums (Billboard)	48

Chart (2025)	Peak position
Greek Albums (IFPI)	8

=== Year-end charts ===
Chart (2003)	Position
UK Albums (OCC)	28

== Certifications ==
Region	Certification	Certified units/sales
United Kingdom (BPI)	2× Platinum	600,000^{^}
^{‡} Sales+streaming figures based on certification alone.
