= It Means Nothing =

2007 single by Stereophonics

Single by Stereophonics

from the album Pull the Pin
- B-side: "Bank Holiday Monday"; "Helter Skelter"; "Hangman" (demo)
- Written: 2005
- Released: 24 September 2007
- Studio: Grouse Lodge (County Westmeath, Ireland); Real World (Wiltshire, England); Eden (London, England)
- Length: 3:48
- Label: V2
- Songwriter(s): Kelly Jones
- Producer(s): Kelly Jones; Jim Lowe

Stereophonics singles chronology
"Bank Holiday Monday" (2007)	"It Means Nothing" (2007)	"My Friends" (2007)

Music video
- "It Means Nothing" on YouTube

"It Means Nothing" is a song by Welsh rock band Stereophonics from their sixth studio album, Pull the Pin (2007). The ballad was released as a single on 24 September 2007 and reached number 12 on the UK Singles Chart. B-side "Helter Skelter" is a cover version of the original song by the Beatles.

== Background and meaning ==
Lead singer and guitarist Kelly Jones wrote "It Means Nothing" about the 7 July 2005 London bombings shortly after the event; it was one of the first songs composed for Pull the Pin. A midtempo ballad, the song is a retrospective account on the bombings with theological overtones, with lyrics such as "You can find yourself a god / Believe in which one you want / 'Cause they love you all the same / They just go by different names."

== Track listings ==
UK CD single

1. "It Means Nothing" – 3:48
2. "Bank Holiday Monday" – 3:14
3. "Helter Skelter" – 4:19
4. "Hangman" (demo) – 2:46

UK 7-inch single 1

A. "It Means Nothing"
B. "Bank Holiday Monday"

UK 7-inch single 2

A. "It Means Nothing" (live)
B. "Bank Holiday Monday" (live)

== Credits and personnel ==
Credits are taken from the first UK 7-inch single sleeve and the Pull the Pin booklet.

Studios

- Recorded at Grouse Lodge (County Westmeath, Ireland), Real World Studios (Wiltshire, England), and Eden Studios (London, England)
- Mixed at South Lane Studios (England)
- Mastered at Sterling Sound

Personnel

- Kelly Jones – writing, vocals, guitars, production
- Richard Jones – bass
- Javier Weyler – drums
- Jim Lowe – production, engineering
- Mike "Spike" Stent – mixing
- Ted Jensen – mastering
- Miles Aldridge – cover photography

== Charts ==
Chart (2007)	Peak position
Belgium (Ultratip Bubbling Under Flanders)	23
Scotland (OCC)	5
UK Singles (OCC)	12
