= Just Looking (song) =

1999 single by Stereophonics

Single by Stereophonics

from the album Performance and Cocktails
- B-side: "Postmen Do Not Great Movie Heroes Make"
- Written: September 1997 (Amsterdam)
- Released: 22 February 1999
- Studio: Real World (Bath, Somerset, England)
- Length: 4:13
- Label: V2
- Composers: Kelly Jones; Richard Jones; Stuart Cable
- Lyricist: Kelly Jones
- Producers: Bird & Bush

Stereophonics singles chronology
"The Bartender and the Thief" (1998)	"Just Looking" (1999)	"Pick a Part That's New" (1999)

Music video
- "Just Looking" on YouTube

"Just Looking" is a song by Welsh rock band Stereophonics, issued as the second single from their second album, Performance and Cocktails (1999). It was released on 22 February 1999, reaching number four on the UK Singles Chart and number 18 in Ireland. In 2022, it was certified gold by the British Phonographic Industry (BPI) for sales and streams of over 400,000 units. A live acoustic version is featured on CD two of the "Step On My Old Size Nines" single. The song's music video features the band in a car with Stuart Cable driving. He offers the other members a Jelly Baby, and the car ends up sinking underwater.

== Track listings ==
UK CD1

1. "Just Looking"
2. "Postmen Do Not Great Movie Heroes Make" (featuring Marco Migliari)
3. "Sunny Afternoon" (the Kinks cover)

UK CD2

1. "Just Looking" (album version)
2. "Local Boy in the Photograph" (recorded live for Radio One)
3. "Same Size Feet" (recorded live for Radio One)

UK limited-edition 7-inch single

A. "Just Looking"
B. "Postmen Do Not Great Movie Heroes Make" (featuring Marco Migliari)

== Credits and personnel ==
Credits are taken from the Performance and Cocktails album booklet.

Recording

- Written in September 1997 (a hotel in Amsterdam)
- Recorded at Real World (Bath, Somerset, England)
- Mastered at Metropolis (London, England)

Personnel

- Kelly Jones – music, lyrics, vocals, guitar
- Richard Jones – music, bass
- Stuart Cable – music, drums
- Marshall Bird – keyboards
- Bird & Bush – production
- Al Clay – mixing
- Ian Cooper – mastering

== Charts ==
=== Weekly charts ===
Chart (1999)	Peak position
Europe (Eurochart Hot 100)	18
Ireland (IRMA)	18
Scottish Singles Sales (Official Charts)	3
UK Singles (Official Charts)	4
UK Indie (Official Charts)	2

=== Year-end charts ===
Chart (1999)	Position
UK Singles (OCC)	109

== Certifications ==
Region	Certification	Certified units/sales
United Kingdom (BPI)	Gold	400,000^{‡}
^{‡} Sales+streaming figures based on certification alone.

== Release history ==
Region	Date	Format(s)	Label(s)	Ref.
United Kingdom	22 February 1999	CD; cassette	V2	
United Kingdom	1 March 1999	7-inch vinyl	V2	
