= My Friends (Stereophonics song) =

Single by Stereophonics

from the album Pull the Pin
- B-side: "Nitedrive"
- Released: 3 December 2007
- Recorded: 2007
- Genre: Post-grunge
- Length: 3:35
- Label: V2
- Songwriter(s): Kelly Jones
- Producer(s): Kelly Jones; Jim Lowe

Stereophonics singles chronology
"It Means Nothing" (2007)	"My Friends" (2007)	"You're My Star" (2008)

Music video
- "My Friends" on YouTube

"My Friends" is a single released by Stereophonics from the album Pull the Pin. It was released on 10 December 2007, reaching #32 in the UK Singles Chart, making it the lowest charting single by the band since "More Life in a Tramps Vest" reached #33 back in 1997.

"Gimme Shelter" is a cover version of the Rolling Stones song.

The video shows the band playing the song at a gig, including clips of the crowd wearing masks making them look like ghosts. The crowd was made up of fans who replied to an email from the band asking for extras. The first 100 replies were called and invited to attend. The location was kept a secret until the morning of the shoot. It was filmed in the underground carpark at Earls Court.

== Track listing ==
=== CD ===
1. "My Friends"
2. "Nitedrive"
3. "Gimme Shelter" (live from Tower Bridge rehearsals)(Jagger/Richards)
4. "My Friends" (live)

=== 7" collectors vinyl ===
Side A

1. "My Friends"

Side B

1. "Nitedrive"

=== Ltd USB Stick ===
1. "My Friends"
2. "Katman" (Live From Tower Bridge Rehearsals)
3. "My Friends" (video)
4. Fan photo video (fans have submitted pictures of themselves with the band or at a gig that has been made into a video)
5. Band Gallery
6. Wallpapers
7. Making of the Video
