= Since I Told You It's Over =

2003 single by Stereophonics

Single by Stereophonics

from the album You Gotta Go There to Come Back
- B-side: "Maybe Tomorrow" (live acoustic)
- Written: 14 February 2003
- Released: 10 November 2003
- Studio: Abbey Road (London, England)
- Length: 4:41 (album, single version); 4:17 (single version radio edit)
- Label: V2
- Songwriter: Kelly Jones
- Producer: Kelly Jones

Stereophonics singles chronology
"Maybe Tomorrow" (2003)	"Since I Told You It's Over" (2003)	"Moviestar" (2004)

Music video
- "Since I Told You It's Over" on YouTube

"Since I Told You It's Over" is a song by Welsh rock band Stereophonics from their fourth studio album, You Gotta Go There to Come Back (2003). Lead singer Kelly Jones wrote the song on 14 February 2003 and recorded it with Stereophonics at Abbey Road Studios. Released as a single on 10 November 2003, the song reached number 16 in the United Kingdom and number 50 in the Netherlands.

== Track listings ==
UK CD1

1. "Since I Told You It's Over" (single version) – 4:43
2. "Nothing Precious at All" (live acoustic version) – 4:35
3. "Madame Helga" (live acoustic version) – 3:29

UK CD2

1. "Since I Told You It's Over" (demo) – 4:06
2. "Jealousy" (demo) – 4:25
3. "I Miss You Now" (demo) – 4:47

UK 7-inch single

1. "Since I Told You It's Over" (single version) – 4:43
2. "Maybe Tomorrow" (live acoustic version) – 4:15

UK DVD single

1. "Since I Told You It's Over" (live video from Glasgow Barrowlands)
2. "Maybe Tomorrow" (live acoustic version audio)

== Credits and personnel ==
Credits are taken from the You Gotta Go There to Come Back album booklet.

Recording

- Written on 14 February 2003
- Recorded and mastered at Abbey Road (London, England)

Personnel

- Kelly Jones – writing, vocals, guitar, strings and brass arrangement, production
- Richard Jones – bass
- Tony Kirkham – piano
- Stuart Cable – drums
- Chris Cameron – strings and brass arrangement
- Chris Bolster – recording assistant
- Jim Lowe – mixing, engineering
- Steve McNichol – Pro Tools engineering
- Chris Blair – mastering

== Charts ==
Chart (2003)	Peak position
Netherlands (Single Top 100)	50
Scottish Singles Sales (Official Charts)	12
UK Singles (Official Charts)	16
UK Indie (Official Charts)	1
