= Vegas Two Times =

2002 single by Stereophonics

Single by Stereophonics

from the album Just Enough Education to Perform
- B-side: "Watch Them Fly Sundays" (live)
- Released: 1 April 2002
- Length: 4:29 (album version); 3:39 (radio edit)
- Label: V2
- Songwriter(s): Kelly Jones
- Producer(s): Marshall Bird; Steve Bush

Stereophonics singles chronology
"Handbags and Gladrags" (2001)	"Vegas Two Times" (2002)	"Madame Helga" (2003)

Music video
- "Vegas Two Times" on YouTube

"Vegas Two Times" is a song by Welsh rock band Stereophonics from their third studio album, Just Enough Education to Perform (2001). Written by lead vocalist and guitarist Kelly Jones, the song was released as the fifth and final single from the album on 1 April 2002, reaching number 23 on the UK Singles Chart and number 39 on the Irish Singles Chart.

== Track listings ==
All songs were written and composed by Kelly Jones; "Local Boy in the Photograph" was co-composed by Richard Jones and Stuart Cable.

CD single

1. "Vegas Two Times"
2. "Mr. Writer" (live)
3. "Watch Them Fly Sundays" (live)

DVD single

1. "Vegas Two Times" (video)
2. "Vegas Two Times" (radio edit audio)
3. "Vegas Two Times" (live audio)
4. "Roll Up and Shine" (live audio)
5. "Mr. Writer" (live video sample)
6. "Watch Them Fly Sundays" (live video sample)
7. "Step on My Old Size Nines" (live video sample)
8. "Local Boy in the Photograph" (live video sample)

== Personnel ==
Stereophonics

- Kelly Jones – vocals, guitars
- Richard Jones – bass
- Stuart Cable – drums

Session musicians

- Marshall Bird – piano, backing vocals
- Aileen McLaughlin – backing vocals
- Anna Ross – backing vocals
- Hazel Fernandez – backing vocals

Production personnel

- Steve Bush – production
- Andy Wallace – mixing

== Charts ==
Chart (2002)	Peak position
Ireland (IRMA)	39
Scotland (OCC)	20
UK Singles (OCC)	23
UK Indie (OCC)	2
