= Helga's Folly =

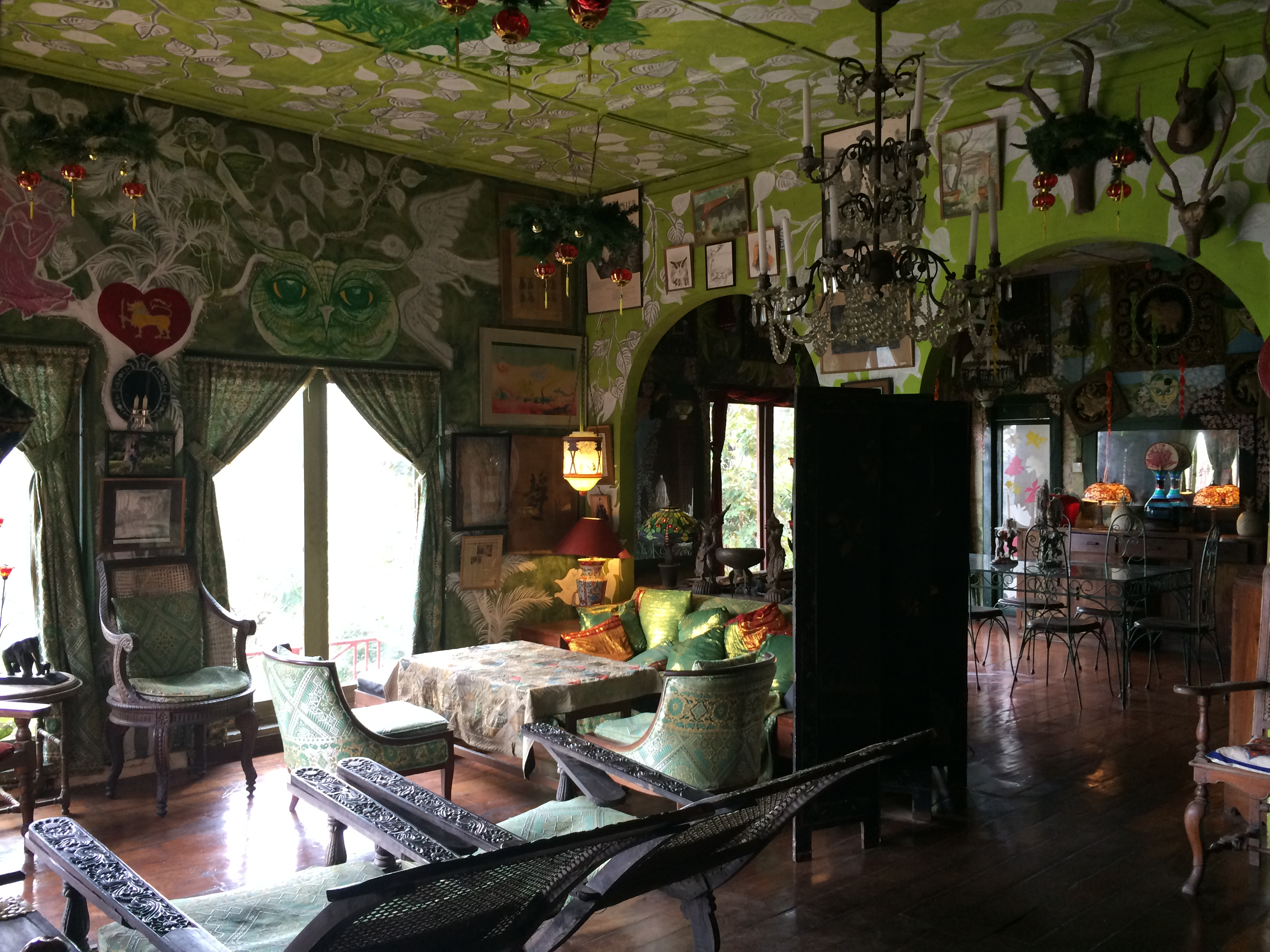
- The green room of the hotel
- Interactive map of the Helga's Folly area
- Former names: Chalet Hotel

General information
- Architectural style: Art Nouveau
- Location: Kandy, Sri Lanka
- Coordinates: 7°17′5.18″N 80°38′43.43″E
- Opened: 1960s
- Owner: Helga de Silva Blow Perera

Design and construction
- Architect: Minnette de Silva

Other information
- Number of rooms: 16
- Number of suites: 1
- Number of restaurants: 1

Website
- www.helgasfolly.com

Helga's Folly is an Art Nouveau boutique hotel situated in Kandy, Sri Lanka owned by Helga de Silva Blow Perera, daughter of Fredrick de Silva. Gregory Peck, Peter Finch, William Holden, Mahatma Gandhi, Vivien Leigh, Laurence Olivier, Jawaharlal Nehru, and Kelly Jones of the Stereophonics are some of the notable guests who stayed at the hotel. Jones went on to write and record the song "Madame Helga" after his stay at the hotel. Helga's Folly has been described as "insane, kind of creepy, but awesome at the same time."

== History ==
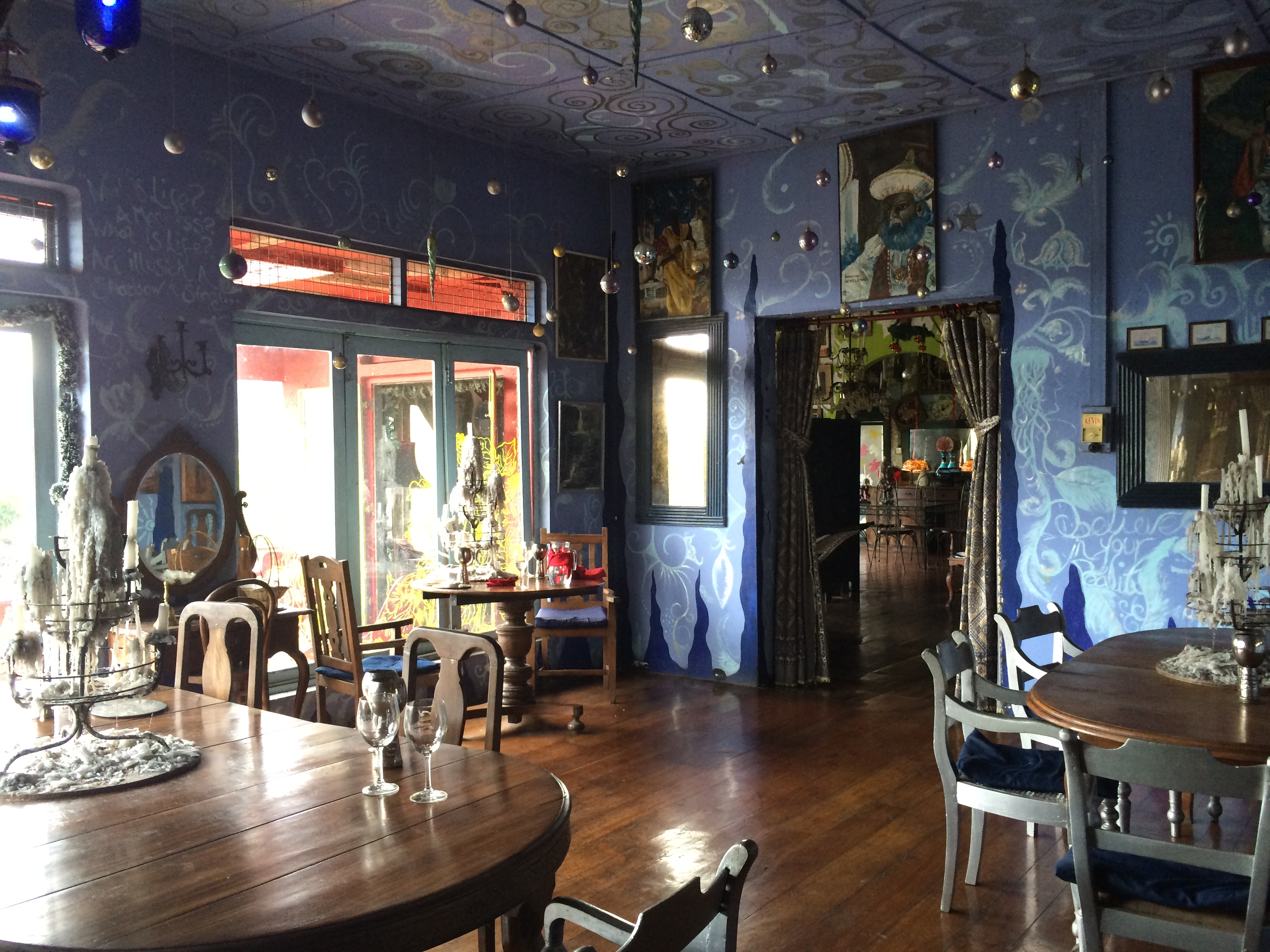
The blue room

Originally it was the family home, designed by her mother, Esme de Silva in the 1930s. In the mid-1990s, de Silva inherited the hotel from her parents and renamed the hotel to Helga's Folly.

== Accommodations ==
The hotel consists of eight superior rooms, eight deluxe rooms, eight budget and one suite. The hotel self-designated as an 'anti-hotel' and decorated with antiques, objects of art, murals, and hundreds of family photographs.

== See also ==
- List of hotels in Sri Lanka
