= Devil (Stereophonics song) =

2005 single by Stereophonics

Single by Stereophonics

from the album Language. Sex. Violence. Other?
- B-side: "Brother", "Dakota", "Dapper Dan"
- Released: 19 September 2005
- Length: 4:40
- Label: V2
- Songwriter(s): Kelly Jones
- Producer(s): Kelly Jones; Jim Lowe

Stereophonics singles chronology
"Superman" (2005)	"Devil" (2005)	"Rewind" (2005)

Music video
- "Devil" on YouTube

"Devil" is the third single from Welsh rock band Stereophonics' fifth studio album, Language. Sex. Violence. Other? (2005). The song is the fourth track on the album, on which "Brother" fades into this song. On the Live from Dakota album, prior to playing "Devil", Kelly Jones states the song is "inspired by the movies of Charles Bukowski". The single peaked at number 11 on the UK Singles Chart.

== Music video ==
The music video for this song shows Kelly Jones in a hotel room, tied to a chair. A woman arrives and appears to be the kidnapper. Soon after, he is taken outside and forced into the trunk of a car that she drives to an unknown place. There are shots of the band performing this song occasionally. At the end of the video, the title card "To Be Continued..." appears.

== Track listings ==
CD1

1. "Devil"
2. "Dapper Dan" (Live From Tower Bridge Rehearsals)

CD2

1. "Devil"
2. "Dakota" – Live From New York
3. "Brother" – Live From New York
4. "Devil" – CD-Rom Video

7-inch

1. "Devil"
