= Just Enough Education to Perform =

Studio album by Stereophonics
- Released: 11 April 2001
- Recorded: October 1998 – February 2001
- Studios: Real World Studios, (Box); Monnow Valley Studio, (Rockfield)
- Genres: Rock; pop rock
- Length: 45:46
- Label: V2
- Producers: Bird and Bush

Stereophonics chronology
Performance and Cocktails (1999)	Just Enough Education to Perform (2001)	You Gotta Go There to Come Back (2003)

Singles from Just Enough Education to Perform
- 1. "Mr. Writer" Released: 19 March 2001; 2. "Have a Nice Day" Released: 11 June 2001; 3. "Step on My Old Size Nines" Released: 24 September 2001; 4. "Handbags and Gladrags" Released: 3 December 2001; 5. "Vegas Two Times" Released: 1 April 2002

Just Enough Education to Perform is the third studio album by Welsh rock band Stereophonics. Released on 11 April 2001, the album topped the UK Albums Chart with 140,000 copies sold, and spawned three top-twenty singles in the form of "Mr. Writer", "Have a Nice Day" and "Step on My Old Size Nines". The album's title comes from a line in the song "Mr. Writer".

When the album was originally released it had 11 tracks; it was then re-released in 2002 to include "Handbags and Gladrags" after it was released as a single.

== Reception ==
=== Critical response ===
Professional ratings
Aggregate scores
Source	Rating
Metacritic	68/100
Review scores
Source	Rating
AllMusic	3.5/5 stars
The Guardian	4/5 stars
Drowned in Sound	2/10
Entertainment Weekly	B
laut.de	4/5 stars
Mojo	4/5 stars
NME	5/10
Pitchfork	5.2/10
Q	3/5 stars
RTE.ie	3/5 stars

Just Enough Education to Perform received generally mixed to positive reviews. At Metacritic, which assigns a weighted average rating out of 100 to reviews from mainstream critics, the album received an average score of 68 based on 10 reviews. Despite some negative reviews, it had their highest score on Metacritic until 2022's Oochya! exceeded it by one point with a score of 69.

Writing in Observer Music Monthly, Tony Heyman commented on the title of the album, claiming "regardless of their level of education, the Stereophonics clearly have no performing qualities whatsoever. If they are suggesting a connection between formal education and musical ability, they must be four [sic] illiterate morons who were expelled from playschool for being too thick." Heyman launched a rant against the group, referring to the album as "musical excrement, scooped unhygienically from a poorly-maintained squat toilet in an area without adequate sanitation." He suggested that if it was not laminated, the CD insert booklet could be distributed to third-world communities as toilet paper.

=== Commercial performance ===
On its initial release in 2001, Just Enough Education to Perform reached number 1 in the UK charts where it stayed for two weeks, it topped the charts for another two weeks in the second week of January 2002, nine months after its initial release. The album then went on to re-enter the charts several times: it peaked at number 27 during June 2002, number 37 in July 2003 and number 34 in August 2003, until finally disappearing from the top 100. In 2001 it was the 4th biggest selling album in the UK, and in 2002 it was the 24th biggest selling album in the UK, as well as being the 39th biggest selling album of the decade. It went on to be certified 5× platinum in the UK. As of 2009 it has sold 83,000 copies in the United States according to Nielsen SoundScan.

== Track listing ==
All tracks are written by Kelly Jones except where noted.

No.	Title	Length
1.	"Vegas Two Times"	4:29
2.	"Lying in the Sun"	4:31
3.	"Mr. Writer" (music co-written by Marshall Bird)	5:19
4.	"Step on My Old Size Nines"	4:00
5.	"Have a Nice Day"	3:25
6.	"Nice to Be Out"	3:08
7.	"Watch Them Fly Sundays"	3:29
8.	"Everyday I Think of Money"	3:24
9.	"Maybe"	4:34
10.	"Caravan Holiday"	3:12
11.	"Rooftop"	6:13
Total length:		45:46

Just Enough Education to Perform – Bonus CD-ROM tracks
No.	Title	Length
1.	"Lying in the Sun" (acoustic version)
2.	"Step on My Old Size Nines" (acoustic version)

Just Enough Education to Perform – Japanese edition (bonus track)
No.	Title	Length
12.	"Maritim Belle Vue in Kiel"	5:39

Just Enough Education to Perform – 2002 re-release
No.	Title	Length
1.	"Vegas Two Times"	4:29
2.	"Lying in the Sun"	4:31
3.	"Mr. Writer" (music co-written by Marshall Bird)	5:19
4.	"Step on My Old Size Nines"	4:00
5.	"Have a Nice Day"	3:25
6.	"Nice to Be Out"	3:08
7.	"Handbags and Gladrags" (Mike d'Abo)	4:37
8.	"Watch Them Fly Sundays"	3:29
9.	"Everyday I Think of Money"	3:24
10.	"Maybe"	4:34
11.	"Caravan Holiday"	3:12
12.	"Rooftop" (includes hidden track "Surprise", starting at 7:15)	11:25

== Personnel ==
Stereophonics

- Kelly Jones – vocals, guitar,
- Richard Jones – bass, harmonica
- Stuart Cable – drums

Additional musicians

- Marshall Bird – piano, backing vocals, Wurlitzer, harmonica
- Aileen McLaughlin – backing vocals on "Vegas Two Times"
- Anna Ross – backing vocals on "Vegas Two Times"
- Hazel Fernandez – backing vocals on "Vegas Two Times"
- Glenn Hyde – harmonica on "Rooftop"

Technical personnel

- Production – Bird, Steve Bush
- Engineering – Bird & Bush
- Mixing – Andy Wallace
- Mastering – Bob Ludwig
- Production on "Handbags and Gladrags" – Laurie Latham, Stereophonics

== Charts and certifications ==
=== Weekly charts ===
Chart (2001)	Peak position
Australian Albums (ARIA)	38
Austrian Albums (Ö3 Austria)	33
Belgian Albums (Ultratop Flanders)	34
Belgian Albums (Ultratop Wallonia)	16
Dutch Albums (Album Top 100)	43
French Albums (SNEP)	25
German Albums (Offizielle Top 100)	35
Irish Albums (IRMA)	1
Italian Albums (FIMI)	45
New Zealand Albums (RMNZ)	21
Scottish Albums (Official Charts)	1
Swedish Albums (Sverigetopplistan)	59
Swiss Albums (Schweizer Hitparade)	29
UK Albums (Official Charts)	1
US Billboard 200	188

=== Year-end charts ===
Chart (2001)	Position
Belgian Albums (Ultratop Wallonia)	99
Irish Albums (IRMA)	9
UK Albums (OCC)	4
Chart (2002)	Position
UK Albums (OCC)	24
Chart (2003)	Position
UK Albums (OCC)	137

=== Certifications and sales ===
Region	Certification	Certified units/sales
Netherlands (NVPI)	Gold	40,000^{^}
United Kingdom (BPI)	6× Platinum	1,804,880
United States	—	83,000
Summaries
Europe (IFPI)	2× Platinum	2,000,000^{*}
^{*} Sales figures based on certification alone.^{^} Shipments figures based on certification alone.

== Popular culture ==
Manchester United and England forward Wayne Rooney has the album's name tattooed in a design on his right forearm. Rooney is a longtime fan of the band and is good friends with them.
