= Superman (Stereophonics song) =

2005 single Stereophonics

Single by Stereophonics

from the album Language. Sex. Violence. Other?
- B-side: "Outside"
- Released: 20 June 2005
- Length: 5:07 (album version); 3:53 (single edit)
- Label: V2
- Songwriter(s): Kelly Jones
- Producer(s): Kelly Jones; Jim Lowe

Stereophonics singles chronology
"Dakota" (2005)	"Superman" (2005)	"Devil" (2005)

Music video
- "Superman" on YouTube

"Superman" is a song by the Stereophonics. It is the first track on their fifth studio album, Language. Sex. Violence. Other? (2005). The song was released as the second single from the album on 20 June 2005, peaking at number 13 on the UK Singles Chart. The song is featured on the live CD/DVD, Live from Dakota at which they opened with Superman, like they have done in many gigs since the release of the track.

== Charts ==
Chart (2005)	Peak position
Ireland (IRMA)	19
Scotland (OCC)	6
UK Singles (OCC)	13
UK Indie (OCC)	2
