= Have a Nice Day (Stereophonics song) =

2001 single by Stereophonics

Single by Stereophonics

from the album Just Enough Education to Perform
- B-side: "Surprise"
- Released: 11 June 2001
- Studio: Real World (Bath, Somerset, England); Monnow Valley (Rockfield, Wales)
- Length: 3:25
- Label: V2
- Songwriter: Kelly Jones
- Producers: Bird and Bush

Stereophonics singles chronology
"Mr. Writer" (2001)	"Have a Nice Day" (2001)	"Step on My Old Size Nines" (2001)

Music video
- "Have a Nice Day" on YouTube

Audio sample
- "Have a Nice Day": file; help

"Have a Nice Day" is the second single from British rock band Stereophonics, taken from their third album Just Enough Education to Perform (2001). Written by Kelly Jones and produced by Bird and Bush, it was released on 11 June 2001. The song received negative reviews but reached number five on the UK Singles Chart and went on to become one of the band's biggest hits. It also found success worldwide, reaching number 11 in Ireland, number 37 in New Zealand, and number 26 on the US Billboard Adult Top 40, becoming Stereophonics' first song to chart in the United States.

== Background and release ==
The lyrics for "Have a Nice Day" are based on a cab fare Stereophonics took in San Francisco Bay when they were touring in the United States. When the band got in the back of the cab the driver said to them, "I hate this place, it's full of tourists and processed fish". He explained to the trio that he was a poet who believes everyone in the world are alike; the only difference is the accents. At the end of the journey the driver ended the conversation with: "That'll be seven bucks, have a nice day". After the cab journey, lead singer and guitarist Kelly Jones took the conversation and placed it into the lyrics.

Jones later put the words and music together in October 1999 in a hotel in Europe. The song was first released on Just Enough Education to Perform on 17 April 2001. It was later released as the album's second single on 11 June 2001. The song was also included in the band's first greatest hits compilation album, Decade in the Sun: Best of Stereophonics.

== Music video ==
The first video for "Have a Nice Day" was directed by Jake & Jim, it features the band along with their touring musicians Scott James on guitar, Tony Kirkham on keyboard and twenty-one models. Throughout the video Kelly Jones is tied to a blue and white target with balloons round his wrists and ankles.

The treatment was written by Kelly Jones, who was trying to do a mix between Jimi Hendrix's Electric Ladyland album cover and the Clint Eastwood film Bronco Billy though when he went to the set and saw the half-naked models with glitter he ended up feeling like Les Dawson.

== Reception ==
=== Critical response ===
"Have a Nice Day" received negative reviews from music critics. When reviewing the album, John Dark from Pitchfork said it "has more sap than a Vermont maple." He was also critical of the song's narrative structure and signature line: "ba-ba-ba's". NME summarised the song as a "beige smudge of a song".

=== Chart performance ===
"Have a Nice Day" debuted at number five on the UK Singles Chart, making it the band's fifth single to chart in the top five and it remained in the charts for nine weeks. In 2020, the British Phonographic Industry awarded the song with a Platinum certification. On the Irish Singles Chart the single peaked at number five and remained in the charts for eleven weeks.

In New Zealand, the song debuted at number 42 on 5 August 2001 before reaching number 37 the following week and remained in the chart for four weeks. The song appeared in the Dutch Top 40 charts on 16 June 2001 at number 95, it ascended to number 87 for the next two weeks until it reached its peak position at number 84. It remained in the charts for the next six weeks until it dropped out. In the United States, "Have a Nice Day" is the only Stereophonics single to chart on the Billboard Adult Top 40, peaking at number 26.

== Track listings ==
All tracks are written by Kelly Jones except "Heart of Gold", written by Neil Young.

UK CD1
No.	Title	Length
1.	"Have a Nice Day"
2.	"Surprise"
3.	"Piano for a Stripper" (demo)

UK CD2
No.	Title	Length
1.	"Have a Nice Day" (live acoustic)
2.	"Heart of Gold" (live acoustic)
3.	"I Stopped to Fill My Car Up" (live acoustic)

UK 7-inch and cassette single; European CD single
No.	Title	Length
1.	"Have a Nice Day"
2.	"Surprise"

Australian, New Zealand, and Japanese CD single
No.	Title	Length
1.	"Have a Nice Day"
2.	"Surprise"
3.	"Piano for a Stripper" (demo)
4.	"Heart of Gold" (live acoustic)
5.	"I Stopped to Fill My Car Up" (live acoustic)

== Credits and personnel ==
Credits are taken from the Just Enough Education to Perform album booklet.

Studios

- Recorded at Real World Studios (Bath, Somerset, England) and Monnow Valley Studios (Rockfield, Wales)
- Mixed at Soundtrack Studios (New York City)
- Mastered at Gateway Mastering (Portland, Maine, US)

Stereophonics

- Kelly Jones – vocals, guitar
- Richard Jones – bass
- Stuart Cable – drums

Additional personnel

- Marshall Bird – piano, backing vocals, Wurlitzer
- Bird and Bush – production, engineering
- Andy Wallace – mixing
- Bob Ludwig –mastering

== Charts ==
=== Weekly charts ===
Chart (2001–2002)	Peak position
Australia (ARIA)	73
Europe (Eurochart Hot 100)	26
Ireland (IRMA)	11
Italy (FIMI)	41
Netherlands (Single Top 100)	84
New Zealand (Recorded Music NZ)	37
Scottish Singles Sales (Official Charts)	2
UK Singles (Official Charts)	5
UK Indie (Official Charts)	1
US Adult Pop Airplay (Billboard)	26

=== Year-end charts ===
Chart (2001)	Position
UK Singles (OCC)	139

Chart (2002)	Position
US Adult Top 40 (Billboard)	86

== Certifications ==
Region	Certification	Certified units/sales
United Kingdom (BPI)	Platinum	600,000^{‡}
^{‡} Sales+streaming figures based on certification alone.

== Release history ==
Region	Date	Format(s)	Label(s)	Ref(s).
United Kingdom	11 June 2001	CD; cassette	V2	
Japan	13 June 2001	CD	V2	
United Kingdom	18 June 2001	7-inch vinyl	V2	
Australia	2 July 2001	CD	V2	
United States	15 October 2001	Hot adult contemporary radio	V2	
United States	16 October 2001	Alternative radio	V2	
United States	26 November 2001	Triple A radio	V2	
United States	11 January 2002	Contemporary hit radio	V2	

== Appearances in media ==
"Have a Nice Day" was briefly used in Dawn of the Dead, in an episode of The Naked Chef and in the Veronica Mars episode "Drinking the Kool-Aid". It was also included in the 2002 Roswell TV soundtrack. The song plays in Black Mirror episode Shut Up and Dance.
