= Pick a Part That's New =

1999 single by Stereophonics

Single by Stereophonics

from the album Performance and Cocktails
- B-side: "Nice to Be Out" (demo)
- Written: September 1997 (New York)
- Released: 27 February 1999
- Studio: Parkgate (East Sussex, England)
- Length: 3:33
- Label: V2
- Composers: Kelly Jones; Richard Jones; Stuart Cable
- Lyricist: Kelly Jones
- Producers: Bird & Bush

Stereophonics singles chronology
"Just Looking" (1999)	"Pick a Part That's New" (1999)	"I Wouldn't Believe Your Radio" (1999)

Music video
- "Pick a Part That's New" on YouTube

"Pick a Part That's New" is a song by Welsh rock band Stereophonics. It was first released as a single on 27 February 1999 in Japan, serving as the band's debut single there. In the United Kingdom, it was issued on 3 May 1999 as the third single from their second studio album, Performance and Cocktails (1999). "Pick a Part That's New" reached number four on the UK Singles Chart and number 17 in Ireland. In March 2000, the song charted in Canada, peaking at number 22 on the RPM Top 30 Rock Report.

An acoustic version of the song is found on CD2 of the "Pick a Part That's New" single. A live version from Morfa Stadium is available on CD2 of the "I Wouldn't Believe Your Radio" single.

== Music video ==
The music video features the band parodying the 1969 film The Italian Job in Turin and performing in a bus which is on a cliff edge.

== Track listings ==
All songs were written by Kelly Jones, Richard Jones, and Stuart Cable except where noted.

UK CD1

1. "Pick a Part That's New"
2. "Nice to Be Out" (demo)
3. "Positively 4th Street" (Bob Dylan)
4. "Pick a Part That's New" (video)

UK CD2

1. "Pick a Part That's New" (acoustic)
2. "In My Day"
3. "Something in the Way" (Kurt Cobain)

UK 7-inch and cassette single

1. "Pick a Part That's New"
2. "Nice to Be Out" (demo)

European CD single

1. "Pick a Part That's New"
2. "Sunny Afternoon" (Ray Davies)

Australian CD single

1. "Pick a Part That's New"
2. "Nice to Be Out" (demo)
3. "Positively 4th Street" (Dylan)
4. "Pick a Part That's New" (acoustic version)

Japanese CD single

1. "Pick a Part That's New"
2. "Just Looking"
3. "Postmen Do Not Great Movie Heroes Make" (featuring Marco Migliari)
4. "She Takes Her Clothes Off" (live at Cardiff Castle)
5. "Raymonds Shop" (live at Cardiff Castle)

== Credits and personnel ==
Credits are taken from the Performance and Cocktails album booklet.

Recording

- Written in September 1997 (a hotel in New York)
- Recorded at Parkgate (East Sussex, England)
- Mastered at Metropolis (London, England)

Personnel

- Kelly Jones – music, lyrics, vocals, guitar
- Richard Jones – music, bass
- Stuart Cable – music, drums
- Marshall Bird – keyboards
- Bird & Bush – production
- Al Clay – mixing
- Ian Cooper – mastering

== Charts ==
=== Weekly charts ===
Chart (1999–2000)	Peak position
Canada Rock/Alternative (RPM)	22
Europe (Eurochart Hot 100)	17
Ireland (IRMA)	17
Scottish Singles Sales (Official Charts)	3
UK Singles (Official Charts)	4
UK Indie (Official Charts)	2

=== Year-end charts ===
Chart (1999)	Position
UK Singles (OCC)	127

== Certifications ==
Region	Certification	Certified units/sales
United Kingdom (BPI)	Silver	200,000^{‡}
^{‡} Sales+streaming figures based on certification alone.

== Release history ==
Region	Date	Format(s)	Label(s)	Ref.
Japan	27 February 1999	CD	V2	
United Kingdom	3 May 1999	CD; cassette	V2	
United Kingdom	10 May 1999	7-inch vinyl	V2	
United States	31 August 1999	Alternative radio	V2	
