= Out of Time (Rolling Stones song) =

1966 song by the Rolling Stones

- Picture sleeve for 1975 single release

Song by the Rolling Stones

from the album Aftermath (UK)
- Released: 15 April 1966 (UK); 26 June 1967 (US Flowers album version)
- Recorded: March 1966
- Studio: RCA, Hollywood, California
- Genre: Pop; soul
- Length: 5:37 (UK); 3:41 (US)
- Label: Decca
- Songwriter: Jagger/Richards
- Producer: Andrew Loog Oldham

The Rolling Stones chronology
"I Don't Know Why" (1975)	"Out of Time" (1966)	"Fool To Cry" (1975)

"Out of Time" is a song by the Rolling Stones, first released on their 1966 album Aftermath (UK version). The most commercially successful version of the song was by Chris Farlowe, an English solo artist. Farlowe's single, produced by Mick Jagger, peaked at number one in the UK Singles Chart on 28 July 1966 and stayed at the top for one week. A shorter alternative mix of the Rolling Stones' recording was released in the US in 1967 on the album Flowers. A third version featuring Jagger's lead vocal and the orchestration and backing vocals from Farlowe's cover version (plus a new female backing vocal) was released on the 1975 rarities album Metamorphosis and as a single.

The song was never performed live by the Stones until June 2022, during the opening concert of their Sixty tour.

== Composition and recording ==
The song was written by Mick Jagger and Keith Richards. Jagger produced the hit single version by Chris Farlowe.

The Rolling Stones released three versions of "Out of Time". The first, recorded by the band in Los Angeles in March 1966, appeared on the UK version of 1966's Aftermath and featured a marimba part played by Brian Jones. In this format the song was 5:19 long. A shorter version of this recording appeared in the US on 1967's Flowers, and later on 1972's More Hot Rocks (Big Hits & Fazed Cookies) and 2012's GRRR! super deluxe edition (80-track version).

The song also appeared on the Stones' 1975 album Metamorphosis, which was created under the direction of former Stones manager Allen Klein and released on his ABKCO Records label. (Klein owned the rights to the pre-1971 Rolling Stones catalogue) Cash Box said it was the strongest track on Metamorphosis and said "What yesterday was a classic Stones R&B rocker has gained additional credence over the years." This version was, in fact, the backing track from Farlowe's version, but with a Jagger lead vocal, recorded in London in April 1966 as a demo for Farlowe, and additional backing vocals by Christine Ohlman in the early 1970's at Trod Nossel Studios in Wallingford, CT, under guidance of Andrew Oldham. Ohlman's backing vocals were multi-tracked to replicate a dense, Phil Spector-style Wall of Sound "Girl Group" sound. This version was also released as a single in 1975, reaching #45 in the UK, and was later included on 1989's Singles Collection: The London Years.

56 years after its release, the Rolling Stones performed "Out of Time" live for the first time during the opening show of their 60th anniversary tour on 1 June 2022 in Madrid.

The Aftermath version of the song was featured in the opening credits of Hal Ashby's 1978 film Coming Home. The Metamorphosis version was featured, in its entirety, in Quentin Tarantino's 2019 film Once Upon a Time in Hollywood.

== Chris Farlowe version ==
"Out of Time"

Single by Chris Farlowe

from the album The Art of Chris Farlowe
- B-side: "Baby Make It Soon"
- Released: 17 June 1966
- Recorded: 27–30 April and 6 May 1966
- Studio: Pye Studios, London
- Genre: Rock; soul; baroque pop
- Length: 3:14
- Label: Immediate
- Songwriter: Jagger/Richards
- Producer: Mick Jagger

Chris Farlowe singles chronology
"Think" (1966)	"Out of Time" (1966)	"Ride On, Baby" (1966)

Official audio
- "Out of Time" on YouTube

British vocalist Chris Farlowe had been active as a musician since 1957, and had been a member of a band named the Thunderbirds, where he was the frontman. However, he started going solo in 1962, releasing several singles on both Decca and Columbia Records between that year and 1964. In early 1965, Farlowe was one of the earliest artists to sign with the newly founded independent record label Immediate Records. His first release on that label was "The Fool", a song which was written by Naomi Ford and Lee Hazlewood. This release failed to chart. Following this disappointment, Farlowe started his collaboration with Jagger, who gave him a follow-up single to record: "Think", which had previously been recorded by the Rolling Stones, also for Aftermath. It reached number 37 on the UK Singles Chart.

Following the minor success of "Think", Andrew Loog Oldham was certain that the follow-up would be a hit, and once again recruited Jagger to offer him a song, with him suggesting "Out of Time" as a suitable song which Jagger and Richards had written with Farlowe in mind, believing that the song would fit his voice perfectly.

Mick Jagger had written some good things for me before, such as "Think" and a couple of others. Then he rang me up and said "I've got a new song for you. Come along and have a listen." I went over to his place on Harley Street, Harley House actually, and he played me "Out of Time" on his guitar. My first thought really was "I'm not sure I like this. I'm not sure I like this stuff." but Mick said "bear with it. It'll sound great once it's all arranged and put together." So, when I turned up at the studio [a few weeks later] and saw all the cellos, the whole orchestra, I thought "Ah". Well, they started playing and as they say, it was history in the making...

The session featured several session musicians, including Jimmy Page on guitar along with drummer Andy White and arranger Arthur Greenslade. It appeared that the session was troublesome, as Jagger was not satisfied with Greenslade's arrangement. Eventually, Jagger was satisfied with the final product, and "Out of Time" had been recorded. Farlowe's version is drastically different from the Rolling Stones Aftermath version, heavily features a string arrangement which was not utilized on the original Rolling Stones recording. In fact, the version used the same backing which Jagger previously had dubbed with his own lead vocals in a version which would be released on Metamorphosis.

Immediate Records released "Out of Time" on 17 June 1966. It entered the UK Singles Chart on 23 June 1966, at a position of number 36. "Out of Time" became Farlowe's only top-10 hit, reaching number 1 on 28 July that year, where it stayed for a week. It stayed on the chart for 13 weeks, leaving on 21 September at a position of number 48. It reached number 7 on New Zealand's Listener chart and number 9 on Australia's Go-Set. The single was later featured on Farlowe's third studio album The Art of Chris Farlowe which was released on 25 November of that year. Nonetheless, "Out of Time" became Farlowe's biggest hit and is considered his signature song.

== Personnel ==
=== Rolling Stones version ===
According to authors Philippe Margotin and Jean-Michel Guesdon:

The Rolling Stones

- Mick Jagger – vocals, finger snaps
- Keith Richards – backing vocals, rhythm guitar, acoustic guitar
- Brian Jones – marimba, vibraphone (Note: Margotin & Guesdon are uncertain if Jones is playing a vibraphone, and suggest it may actually be a metallophone.)
- Bill Wyman – bass guitar
- Charlie Watts – drums

Additional musicians

- Ian Stewart – organ
- Jack Nitzsche – piano

=== Chris Farlowe version ===
According to authors Andy Babiuk and Greg Prevost, except where noted:

- Chris Farlowe – vocals
- Eric Ford – bass
- Reg Guest – piano
- Joe Moretti – guitar
- Jimmy Page – guitar
- Andy White – drums
- Sidney Sax – string arrangements

== Charts ==
=== Chris Farlowe version ===
1966 weekly chart performance
Chart (1966)	Peak position
Australia (Go-Set)	9
Canada (RPM)	24
Netherlands (Dutch Top 40)	11
Netherlands (Single Top 100)	11
New Zealand (Listener)	7
Rhodesia (Lyons Maid)	10
South Africa (Springbok)	16
Sweden (Tio i Topp)	15
UK Singles (Official Charts Company)	1
US Bubbling Under Hot 100	122

1966 year-end chart performance
Chart (1966)	Peak Rank
UK Singles (Official Charts Company)	18
