= Chris Farlowe =

English singer (born 1940)

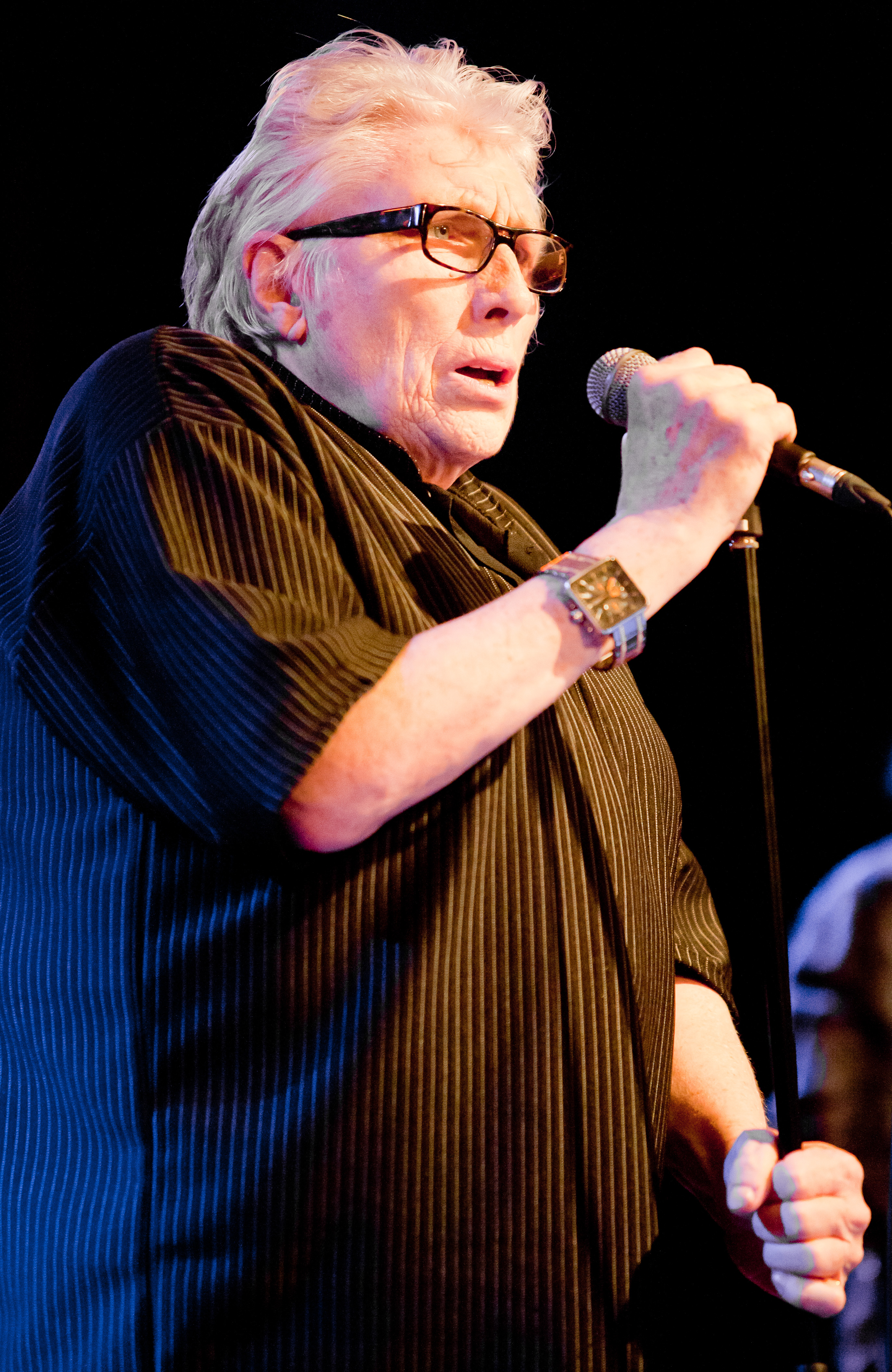
- Farlowe in 2010

Background information
- Also known as: Little Joe Cook
- Born: John Henry Deighton; 13 October 1940 (age 85); Islington, North London, England
- Origin: Finchley, North London, England
- Genres: Blues rock; blue-eyed soul; jazz rock; progressive rock
- Instrument: Vocals
- Years active: 1957–present
- Labels: Columbia, Immediate, Stateside; Sue (pseudonymously)
- Member of: Colosseum
- Formerly of: The Thunderbirds, Atomic Rooster

Chris Farlowe (born John Henry Deighton, 13 October 1940) is an English singer. He is best known for his hit single "Out of Time" written by Mick Jagger and Keith Richards, which rose to No. 1 in the UK Singles Chart in 1966, and his association with bands Atomic Rooster, the Thunderbirds, and Colosseum. Outside his music career, Farlowe collects war memorabilia.

== Early life ==
Farlowe was born in Islington, North London. His mother sang and played piano at clubs. He is the nephew of Len Deighton. Farlowe was an apprentice carpenter in Holloway, London before he was a professional singer. John Henry Deighton became Chris Farlowe, after taking the surname from American guitarist Tal Farlow.

== Career ==
His musical career began with a skiffle group, the John Henry Skiffle Group, in 1957, before he joined the Johnny Burns Rhythm and Blues Quartet in 1958. The John Henry Skiffle Group won a local talent show. He met guitarist Bob Taylor in 1959 and, through Taylor, joined the Thunderbirds, who went on to record five singles for the Columbia label. On Island's Sue label, he released a version of "Stormy Monday Blues" under the pseudonym Little Joe Cook (a name also used by an American singer), which perpetuated the myth that he was a black singer.

Farlowe moved to Andrew Loog Oldham's Immediate label and recorded eleven singles, five of which were cover versions of Rolling Stones songs: "Paint It Black", "Think", "Ride On, Baby", "(I Can't Get No) Satisfaction", and "Out of Time", which reached No. 1 (1966) in the UK Singles Chart. He recorded four more singles, the best known of which are Mike d'Abo's "Handbags and Gladrags", and "My Way of Giving", a cover of a Small Faces album track written by Steve Marriott and Ronnie Lane.

Farlowe was performing at a club in 1966, when Otis Redding approached him, and asked him to join him on an episode of Ready Steady Go! with Eric Burdon.

He began an association with the jazz rock group Colosseum in September 1970, recording a live album and two studio albums including Daughter of Time (1970). Farlowe left a year later, but since Colosseum's reunion in 1994 he appeared on all their albums and tours with them to the present. In February 1972 he joined Atomic Rooster, and is featured on the albums Made in England (1972) and Nice 'n' Greasy (1973). Following Atomic Rooster, Farlowe toured in the UK and collaborated with Northern Irish guitarist Bobby Rice.

In 1978 Farlowe collaborated on two BBC Birmingham productions for which his former Colosseum bandmate Dave Greenslade wrote the theme music. First, in the second series of Gangsters, Farlowe sang the theme song. Farlowe and Greenslade then provided the music and Farlowe played the part of Benny opposite Sonja Kristina in the rock opera Curriculee Curricula. The production was first shown on BBC Two and shot in its entirety on video at the University of Birmingham campus, with Magnus Magnusson as the narrator.

Farlowe sang on two tracks from Jimmy Page's Death Wish II soundtrack (1982), as well as the tracks "Hummingbird", "Prison Blues" and "Blues Anthem" on Page's album Outrider (1988). He toured for a long time with Hamburg Blues Band, mainly in Germany. Since 1999, Farlowe has appeared on stage a number of times alongside Van Morrison.

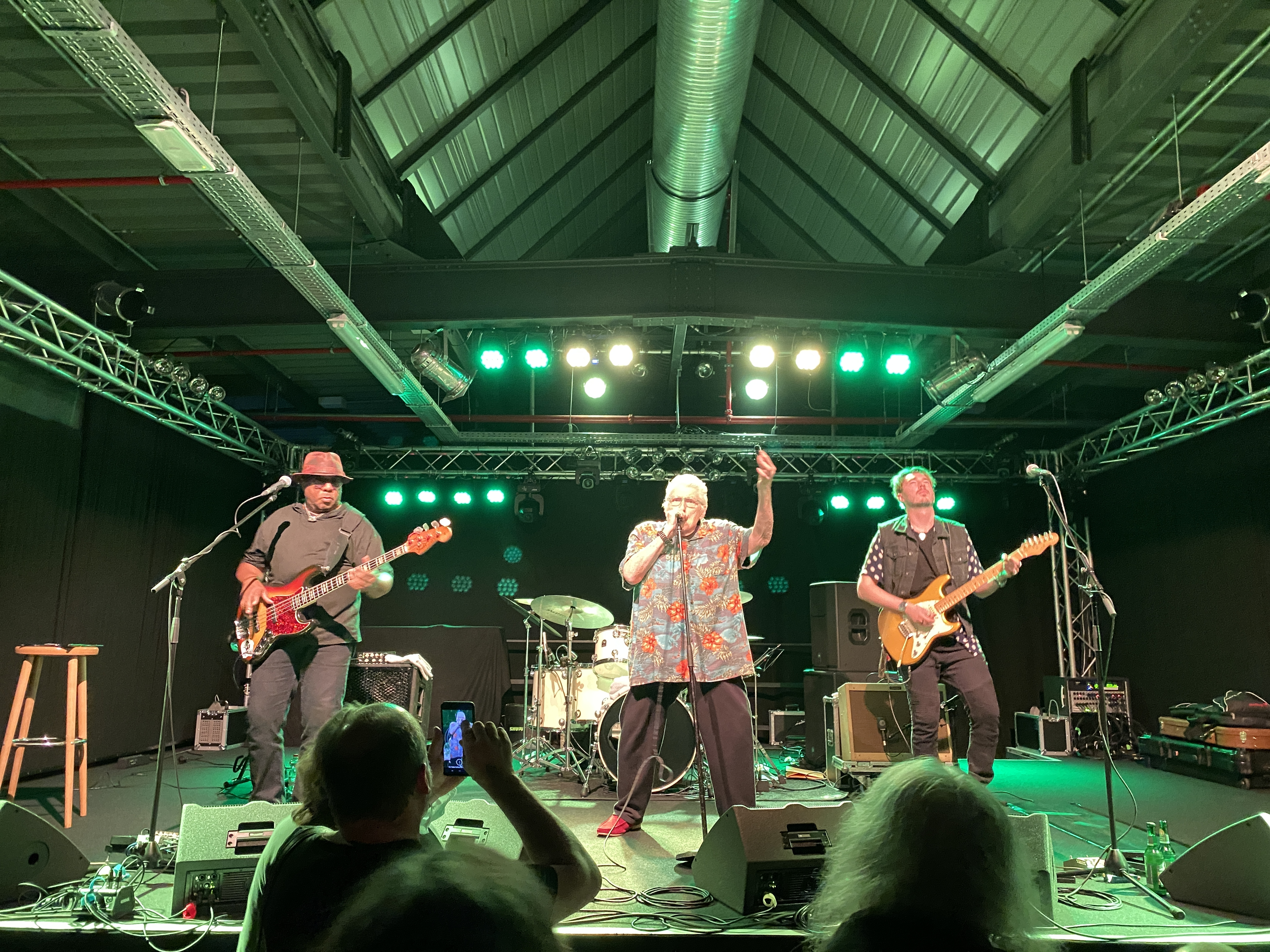
Farlowe (middle) performing with Krissy Matthews and the Hamburg Blues Band in 2021.

In 2009, Farlowe toured as a featured artist with Maggie Bell and Bobby Tench as part of the "Maximum Rhythm and Blues" tour of 32 UK theatres. On 30 July 2016, Farlowe appeared at Wembley Arena, performing his 1966 hit "Out of Time" as part of a show marking the 50th anniversary of the England football team's victory in the 1966 FIFA World Cup Final.

== Personal life ==
Farlowe also collects war memorabilia, and once had a shop that sold Nazi uniforms, which had caused controversy at the time. An interest for his hobby first started when in Hamburg, he noticed and bought an Iron Cross for sale in a Junk shop.

Farlowe has never been married or had children, but nearly got married twice.

== Discography ==
=== Albums ===
- Chris Farlowe and the Thunderbirds (February 1966)
- 14 Things to Think About (June 1966) (UK No. 19)
- The Art of Chris Farlowe (November 1966) (UK No. 37)
- Tonite Lets All Make Love in London (Soundtrack) (July 1968)
- The Last Goodbye (compilation, May 1969)
- From Here to Mama Rosa (September 1970)
- Chris Farlowe Band Live (November 1975)
- Greatest Hits (1977)
- Out of the Blue (July 1985)
- The Live EP: Live in Hamburg (March 1986)
- Born Again (June 1986)
- Chris Farlowe & Roy Herrington Live in Berlin (17/18 October 1991)
- Superblues (Recorded live 1991, released 1994)
- Waiting in the Wings (May 1992)
- Swinging Hollywood (1994)
- Lonesome Road (September 1995)
- BBC in Concert (January 1996)
- As Time Go By (October 1996)
- The Voice (April 1998)
- Glory Bound (March 2001)
- Farlowe That! (May 2003)
- Hungary for the Blues (November 2005)
- At Rockpalast (October 2006)
- Hotel Eingang (2008)
- Bursting over Bremen/Live 1985 (2014)

=== DVDs ===
- At Rockpalast (October 2006)
- At Rockpalast 2 (November 2008)
- At Rockpalast 3 (December 2012)

=== Singles ===
Singles (1962–65)

- "Air Travel" / "Why Did You Break My Heart?" (Decca F.11536) (1962)
- "Girl Trouble" / "Itty Bitty Pieces" (Columbia DB 7237) (1964)
- "Blue Beat" (as "The Beazers") / "I Wanna Shout" (as "The Beazers") (Decca F.11827) (1964)
- "Just a Dream" (Columbia DB 7311) (1964)
- "Buzz with the Fuzz" / "You're the One" (Columbia DB 7614) (1965)

Singles and EPs on Immediate Records (1965–70)

- IM016 "The Fool" / "Treat Her Good" (1965)
- IM023 "Think" / "Don't Just Look at Me" (UK No. 37) (1966)
- IM035 "Out of Time" / "Baby Make It Soon" (UK No. 1) (1966)
- IM038 "Ride On Baby" / "Headlines" (UK No. 31) (1966)
- IM041 "My Way of Giving" / "You're So Good to Me" (UK No. 48) (1967)
- IM049 "Yesterday's Papers" / "Life is But Nothing" (1967)
- IM056 "Moanin'" / "What Have I Been Doing" (UK No. 46) (1967)
- IM065 "Handbags and Gladrags" / "Everyone Makes a Mistake" (UK No. 33) (1967)
- IM066 "The Last Goodbye" / "Paperman Fly in the Sky" (B-side with the Thunderbirds) (1968)
- IM071 "Paint It Black" / "I Just Need Your Loving" (1968)
- IM074 "Dawn" / "April was the Month" (with the Thunderbirds) (1968)
- IM078 "Out of Time" / "Ride On Baby" (1969)
- IMS101 "Out of Time" / "My Way of Giving" (UK No. 44) (1975)
- IMEP001 "Farlowe in the Midnight Hour" (EP) (1965)
- IMEP004 "Chris Farlowe Hits" (EP) (1966)

Singles and EPs on Island and its Sue subsidiary

- "Stormy Monday Blues" (Part One/Part Two) (as Little Joe Cook, Island Sue WI 385)
- Stormy Monday (EP: "Stormy Monday" / "She's Alright" / "Voodoo") (as Chris Farlowe, Island IEP 709, ca. 1966)
