= Step on My Old Size Nines =

2001 single by Stereophonics

Single by Stereophonics

from the album Just Enough Education to Perform
- B-side: "Shoeshine Boy"
- Released: 24 September 2001
- Studio: Real World (Bath, Somerset, England); Monnow Valley (Rockfield, Wales)
- Length: 4:00
- Label: V2
- Songwriter: Kelly Jones
- Producers: Bird and Bush

Stereophonics singles chronology
"Have a Nice Day" (2001)	"Step on My Old Size Nines" (2001)	"Handbags and Gladrags" (2001)

Music video
- "Step on My Old Size Nines" on YouTube

"Step on My Old Size Nines" is the third single from Welsh rock band Stereophonics' third album, Just Enough Education to Perform (2001). The song is track four on the album. It was released on 24 September 2001, reaching number 16 on the UK Singles Chart and number 26 in Ireland. A live acoustic version recorded at the Grand Opera House in York, England, is on CD2 of the "Step on My Old Size Nines" single.

== Background ==
Lead singer Kelly Jones began writing the song in May 2000. While spending a night with his friends in Birmingham, Jones played several of his new songs, during which one of his friends asked if he had written a song in open G tuning. Right before Stereophonics went to Monnow Valley Studios in Wales for a recording session, Jones wrote the entire song with this tuning in 10 minutes and recorded a demo of "Step on My Old Size Nines" at his house. Once he arrived at Monnow Valley Studios, he placed the track onto the demo CD.

== Track listings ==
UK CD1

1. "Step on My Old Size Nines"
2. "Shoeshine Boy"
3. "I'm Only Sleeping" (featuring Noel Gallagher) (Beatles cover)
4. "Step on My Old Size Nines" (video)

UK CD2

1. "Step on My Old Size Nines" (live acoustic)
2. "Everyday I Think of Money" (live acoustic)
3. "Just Looking" (live acoustic)
4. "Everyday I Think of Money" (live acoustic video)

UK cassette single

1. "Step on My Old Size Nines"
2. "Shoeshine Boy"

== Credits and personnel ==
Credits are taken from the Just Enough Education to Perform album booklet.

Studios

- Recorded at Real World Studios (Bath, Somerset, England) and Monnow Valley Studios (Rockfield, Wales)
- Mixed at Soundtrack Studios (New York City)
- Mastered at Gateway Mastering (Portland, Maine, US)

Personnel

- Kelly Jones – writing, vocals, guitar
- Marshall Bird – backing vocals, piano, Wurlitzer, harmonica
- Bird and Bush – production, engineering
- Richard Jones – bass, harmonica
- Stuart Cable – drums
- Andy Wallace – mixing
- Bob Ludwig – mastering

== Charts ==
Chart (2001)	Peak position
Europe (Eurochart Hot 100)	69
Ireland (IRMA)	26
Scotland Singles (OCC)	13
UK Singles (OCC)	16
UK Indie (OCC)	4
