= Maybe Tomorrow (Stereophonics song) =

2003 single by Stereophonics

Single by Stereophonics

from the album You Gotta Go There to Come Back
- B-side: "Have Wheels Will Travel"; "Change Changes Things"; "Sail Away" (demo)
- Written: June 2002 (Number 23)
- Released: 21 July 2003
- Recorded: September–December 2002
- Studio: Hook End Manor (Checkendon, England)
- Genre: Alternative rock; soul
- Length: 4:33
- Label: V2
- Songwriter: Kelly Jones
- Producer: Kelly Jones

Stereophonics singles chronology
"Madame Helga" (2003)	"Maybe Tomorrow" (2003)	"Since I Told You It's Over" (2003)

Music video
- "Maybe Tomorrow" on YouTube

"Maybe Tomorrow" is a song from Welsh rock band Stereophonics' fourth studio album, You Gotta Go There to Come Back (2003). Written and produced by Stereophonics frontman Kelly Jones, the song was released as a single on 21 July 2003 and peaked at number three on the UK Singles Chart. It also charted in several other countries, including the United States, where it reached the top five of the Billboard Triple-A chart, becoming one of their highest-charting US hits.

== Reception and awards ==
The song became the band's second-highest chart position (alongside "The Bartender and the Thief"), peaking at number three on the UK Singles Chart in July 2003; it was their highest-charting song until "Dakota" reached number one in 2005. In October 2026, the British Phonographic Industry (BPI) awarded the song a double platinum certification for sales and streaming units exceeding 1,200,000. Outside the United Kingdom, the song reached number 17 in the Netherlands, number 18 in Ireland, and number 33 in Italy. In the United States, the song became the second of three Stereophonics singles to appear on a Billboard chart, peaking at number five on the Triple-A chart in January 2004.

== Track listings ==
UK CD1

1. "Maybe Tomorrow" – 4:32
2. "Have Wheels Will Travel" – 3:14
3. "Change Changes Things" – 3:21

UK CD2

1. "Maybe Tomorrow" (demo) – 3:51
2. "Madame Helga" (demo) – 3:55
3. "Sail Away" (demo) – 4:19

UK DVD single

1. "Maybe Tomorrow" (audio)
2. The making of "Maybe Tomorrow" (video)

UK 7-inch single

A. "Maybe Tomorrow" – 4:32
B. "Have Wheels Will Travel" – 3:14

European CD single

1. "Maybe Tomorrow" – 4:32
2. "Royal Flush" – 3:29

Australian CD single

1. "Maybe Tomorrow" – 4:32
2. "Madame Helga" – 3:54
3. "Royal Flush" (mono demo) – 3:29
4. "Madame Helga" (live at Glastonbury 2002) – 3:55
5. "Maybe Tomorrow" (video)

== Credits and personnel ==
Credits are taken from the You Gotta Go There to Come Back album booklet.

Recording

- Written in June 2002 at Number 23
- Recorded between September and December 2002 at Hook End Manor (Checkendon, England)
- Mixed at Ocean Way (Hollywood, California)
- Mastered at Abbey Road Studios (London, England)

Personnel

- Kelly Jones – writing, vocals, guitar, Wurlitzer, Mellotron, production
- Richard Jones – bass
- Tony Kirkham – Mellotron, Rhodes
- Stuart Cable – drums
- "Whoever was in the room!" – percussion
- Andy Davies – recording assistant
- Jack Joseph Puig – mixing
- Jim Lowe – engineering
- Steve McNichol – Pro Tools engineering
- Chris Blair – mastering

== Charts ==
=== Weekly charts ===
Chart (2003–2004)	Peak position
Europe (Eurochart Hot 100)	10
Ireland (IRMA)	18
Italy (FIMI)	33
Netherlands (Dutch Top 40)	17
Netherlands (Single Top 100)	32
Scottish Singles Sales (Official Charts)	3
UK Singles (Official Charts)	3
UK Indie (Official Charts)	1
US Adult Alternative Airplay (Billboard)	5

=== Year-end charts ===
Chart (2003)	Position
UK Singles (OCC)	138

Chart (2004)	Position
US Triple-A (Billboard)	30

== Certifications ==
Region	Certification	Certified units/sales
New Zealand (RMNZ)	Platinum	30,000^{‡}
United Kingdom (BPI)	2× Platinum	1,200,000^{‡}
^{‡} Sales+streaming figures based on certification alone.

== Release history ==
Region	Date	Format(s)	Label(s)	Ref.
United Kingdom	21 July 2003	CD; DVD	V2	
United Kingdom	28 July 2003	7-inch vinyl	V2	
United States	13 October 2003	Triple A radio	V2	
