= Performance and Cocktails =

Studio album by Stereophonics
- Released: 8 March 1999
- Recorded: April 1995 – January 1999
- Studios: Courtyard, Sutton Courtenay; Parkgate, Catsfield; Real World, Box; Rockfield, Rockfield
- Genres: Alternative rock; post-Britpop; pop rock
- Length: 50:55
- Label: V2
- Producers: Steve Bush and Marshall Bird AKA: Bird & Bush

Stereophonics chronology
Word Gets Around (1997)	Performance and Cocktails (1999)	Just Enough Education to Perform (2001)

Singles from Performance and Cocktails
- 1. "The Bartender and the Thief" Released: 9 November 1998; 2. "Just Looking" Released: 22 February 1999; 3. "Pick a Part That's New" Released: 3 May 1999 (Note: First released in Japan on 27 February 1999.); 4. "I Wouldn't Believe Your Radio" Released: 23 August 1999; 5. "Hurry Up and Wait" Released: 8 November 1999

Performance and Cocktails is the second studio album by Welsh rock band Stereophonics. It was released by V2 on 8 March 1999. The name of the album comes from lyrics in the album's first song, "Roll Up and Shine", just like the previous album's name, Word Gets Around came from lyrics in that album's final song.

The album was a surprise commercial success for Stereophonics but it received mixed reviews.

== Recording ==
The songs were variously recorded at Real World Studios in Bath, Parkgate in Sussex and Rockfield Studios in Monmouth.

== Album cover ==
The cover photograph was taken by Scarlet Page in autumn 1998 at a football pitch under the Westway in London, and was inspired by an earlier Annie Leibovitz photograph of a couple kissing outside a prison. The British journalist Tony Barrell did extensive research in 2007 to find the female model in the foreground. In the Sunday Times on 11 November 2007, he identified the model as 23-year-old Lucy Joplin. In an interview with Barrell, Joplin explained that the "faraway look" in her eyes was the result of an evening consuming absinthe and opium, and that she was paid £75 in cash for the shoot.

== Reception ==
=== Critical response ===
Professional ratings
Review scores
Source	Rating
AllMusic	3.5/5 stars
laut.de	3/5 stars
NME	6/10
Pitchfork	4.4/10
Q	3/5 stars
Rolling Stone	2.5/5 stars

Performance and Cocktails received generally mixed reviews. At AllMusic, Jason Damas criticised the album for not being as consistent as Word Gets Around; he did however praise "T Shirt Sun Tan", "She Takes Her Clothes Off" and "Pick a Part That's New", calling them the highlights of the album.

Brent DiCrescenzo from Pitchfork had a generally negative review of the album, comparing Stereophonics to Oasis and by summarising the album as, "Basically, what Performance and Cocktails boils down to is loud music engineered and crafted for Britain's summer festival circuit that practically guarantees a perennially muddy experience." Similarly, Barry Walters of Rolling Stone also compared the band to Oasis, stating, "[they] sound like Oasis trying to be Radiohead."

=== Commercial performance ===
Performance and Cocktails gave Stereophonics three straight top five singles in the British charts with "The Bartender and the Thief" reaching number three, and both "Just Looking" and "Pick a Part That's New" reaching number four. The album itself was a success, topping the UK Albums Chart selling 119,954 copies in its first week and going on to become the fifth best selling album in the UK in 1999. Such was the album's persistence, that it re-entered the UK charts over four years after its initial release, reaching number twenty-five in January 2004.

== Legacy ==
With sales of over 2.5 million, Performance and Cocktails is the Stereophonics' second best-selling album (after Just Enough Education to Perform, which has sold over 3.5 million). (Note: Sales figures are based on certifications only.) The record has been certified 5× Platinum in the UK and Platinum in Europe. It has spent a total of 101 weeks in the UK top 100 charts.

The album is seen as one of the best British rock albums of the 1990s. At the Kerrang! awards in 1999, Performance and Cocktails won the "Best Album" award and Stereophonics further won "Best British Band" the same year. On their "Albums of the Year" list, the record was placed at number five. Listeners at Absolute Radio voted for their album of the decade and Performance and Cocktails ranked at number 27. On the radio's shortlist it was included as one of the albums that helped define the sound of the 90s along with Word Gets Around At the Mercury Music Prize awards, the album was nominated for the 1999 prize but was only listed as a "Shortlisted nominee." "Pick a Part That's New" was used in a BT advert for their unlimited broadband deal.

== Track listing ==
All lyrics are written by Kelly Jones; all music is composed by Stereophonics

No.	Title	Length
1.	"Roll Up and Shine"	3:58
2.	"The Bartender and the Thief"	2:54
3.	"Hurry Up and Wait"	4:40
4.	"Pick a Part That's New"	3:34
5.	"Just Looking"	4:13
6.	"Half the Lies You Tell Ain't True"	2:56
7.	"I Wouldn't Believe Your Radio"	3:50
8.	"T-Shirt Sun Tan"	4:05
9.	"Is Yesterday, Tomorrow, Today?"	4:02
10.	"A Minute Longer"	3:46
11.	"She Takes Her Clothes Off"	3:55
12.	"Plastic California"	4:30
13.	"I Stopped to Fill My Car Up"	4:29
Total length:		50:35

== Re-release ==
On 24 August 2010, Stereophonics announced on their website that Performance and Cocktails, along with Word Gets Around, were to be re-released. To accompany the re-releases, Stereophonics performed all the songs on both the albums at the Hammersmith Apollo on 17 and 18 October 2010. They were released on 18 October 2010 and were made into two forms:

Deluxe: The original album on one disc and a bonus CD featuring 12 b-sides and rare tracks.

CD 2 (B-Sides and rarities)
No.	Title	Original release	Length
1.	"The Bartender and the Thief" (Live at Cardiff Castle)		3:28
2.	"Sunny Afternoon"	B-side on "Just Looking"	3:36
3.	"Positively 4th Street"	B-side on "Pick a Part That's New"	3:51
4.	"Fiddlers Green"	B-side on "The Bartender and the Thief"	4:01
5.	"Angie"	B-side on "Hurry Up and Wait"	4:19
6.	"The Old Laughing Lady"	B-side on "I Wouldn't Believe Your Radio"	4:42
7.	"Something in the Way"	B-side on "Pick a Part That's New"	3:46
8.	"Half the Lies You Tell Ain't True" (Live at the Belfort Festival)		3:02
9.	"She Takes Her Clothes Off" (Live at the Hippodrome)		3:57
10.	"Roll Up and Shine" (Live at the Hippodrome)		3:47
11.	"Local Boy in the Photograph" (Live for BBC Radio 1)	B-side on "Just Looking"	4:15
12.	"Just Looking" (Live at the Hippodrome)		4:31
Total length:			47:15

Super-deluxe: The album on one disc (as listed above) and two bonus CDs (one with 15 b-sides and the other includes 10 rare tracks), artcards and a replica of Kelly Jones' notebook.

CD 2 (B-Sides)
No.	Title	Original release	Length
1.	"Sunny Afternoon"	B-side on "Just Looking"
2.	"Positively 4th Street"	B-side on "Pick a Part That's New"
3.	"Fiddlers Green"	B-side on "The Bartender and the Thief"
4.	"The Old Laughing Lady"	B-side on "I Wouldn't Believe Your Radio"
5.	"Angie"	B-side on "Hurry Up and Wait"
6.	"Something in the Way"	B-side on "Pick a Part That's New"
7.	"Local Boy in the Photograph" (Live for BBC Radio 1)	B-side on "Just Looking"
8.	"Same Size Feet" (Live for BBC Radio 1)	B-side on "Just Looking"
9.	"In My Day"	B-side on "Pick a Part That's New"
10.	"The Bartender and the Thief" (Live at Cardiff Castle)	B-side on "The Bartender and the Thief"
11.	"Raymond's Shop" (Live at Cardiff Castle)	B-side on "The Bartender and the Thief"
12.	"T-Shirt Sun Tan" (Live at Morfa Stadium)	B-side on "I Wouldn't Believe Your Radio"
13.	"I Wouldn't Believe Your Radio" (with Stuart Cable singing)	B-side on "Hurry Up and Wait"
14.	"Postmen Do Not Make Great Movie Heroes"	B-side on "Just Looking"
15.	"Nice to Be Out" (Demo)	B-side on "Pick a Part That's New"

CD 3 (Rarities)
No.	Title	Length
1.	"Roll Up and Shine" (Live at the Hippodrome, 1 March 1999)
2.	"Just Looking" (Live at the Hippodrome, 1 March 1999)
3.	"Half the Lies You Tell Ain't True" (Live at Belfort Festival)
4.	"She Takes Her Clothes Off" (Live at the Hippodrome, 1 March 1999)
5.	"The Bartender and the Thief" (Live at Newcastle Uni, 1998)
6.	"Is Yesterday, Tomorrow, Today?" (Live at Newcastle Uni, 1998)
7.	"Pick a Part That's New" (BBC acoustic session 1999)
8.	"I Wouldn't Believe Your Radio" (BBC acoustic session 1999)
9.	"Plastic California" (Live at the Hippodrome, 1 March 1999)
10.	"Sunny Afternoon" (Live at Morfa Stadium 1999)

== Personnel ==
Stereophonics

- Kelly Jones – vocals, guitar
- Richard Jones – bass guitar
- Stuart Cable – drums

Additional

- Marshall Bird – hammond, Rhodes piano, piano, mellotron
- Astrid – backing vocals on "I Stopped to Fill My Car Up"

Technical

- Bird & Bush – producer, engineer, mixing on "She Takes Her Clothes Off"
- Al Clay – mixing
- Ian Cooper – mastering

== Charts and certifications ==
=== Weekly charts ===
Weekly chart performance for Performance and Cocktails
Chart (1999)	Peak position
Australian Albums (ARIA)	67
French Albums (SNEP)	24
German Albums (Offizielle Top 100)	82
Irish Albums (IRMA)	3
New Zealand Albums (RMNZ)	31
Scottish Albums (Official Charts)	1
UK Albums (Official Charts)	1

=== Singles ===
Singles charts (weekly)
Year	Title	Chart peak positions	
Year	Title	IRE	UK
1998	"The Bartender and the Thief"	30	3
1999	"Just Looking"	18	4
1999	"Pick a Part That's New"	17	4
1999	"I Wouldn't Believe Your Radio"	-	11
1999	"Hurry Up And Wait"	23	11
"—" denotes a release that did not chart.

=== Year-end charts ===
Year-end chart performance for Performance and Cocktails
Chart (1999)	Position
UK Albums (OCC)	5
Chart (2000)	Position
UK Albums (OCC)	47
Chart (2001)	Position
UK Albums (OCC)	131

== Certifications ==
Certifications
Region	Certification	Certified units/sales
United Kingdom (BPI)	6× Platinum	1,804,810
Summaries
Europe (IFPI)	Platinum	1,000,000^{*}
^{*} Sales figures based on certification alone.
