= Dakota (song) =

2005 single by Stereophonics

Single by Stereophonics

from the album Language. Sex. Violence. Other?
- B-side: "Long Way Round"
- Written: January 2004
- Released: 28 February 2005
- Length: 4:57
- Label: V2
- Songwriter: Kelly Jones
- Producers: Kelly Jones; Jim Lowe

Stereophonics singles chronology
"Moviestar" (2004)	"Dakota" (2005)	"Superman" (2005)

Music video
- "Dakota" on YouTube

"Dakota" (released in the United States as "Dakota (You Made Me Feel Like the One)") is a song by Welsh alternative rock band Stereophonics. It was the first single taken from their fifth studio album, Language. Sex. Violence. Other?, and was released on 28 February 2005. "Dakota" is Stereophonics' only single to reach number one on the UK Singles Chart and their only single to appear on the US Billboard Modern Rock Tracks chart. It is also their highest-charting single in both Australia and New Zealand.

== Writing ==
Kelly Jones started writing the music for "Dakota" in January 2004. He was staying in a hotel room in Paris while Stereophonics were on a promo tour for You Gotta Go There to Come Back and was trying to find a new sound. Jones knew he had come up with something special, telling Songwriting Magazine, "I text the head of the label V2 at the time and said, 'I think I've got a big song'. That was the first time I'd ever done that and I don't think I've done it since, either."

A month later, while the band were on tour in the United States, he wrote the lyrics in Vermillion, South Dakota and the song's working title was originally named after it. After Slipknot released a song from their third album entitled "Vermilion" and Mercury Rev released their sixth album with a song included on it also called "Vermillion", the band decided to change the title of the song. The name of the song was changed to "Dakota", named after the apartment building in New York City. One of the song's signature lines, "Take a look at me now", was first used—in a similar melody—in their earlier single "Since I Told You It's Over".

== Promotion ==
Then BBC Radio 1 DJ Jo Whiley was the first to play "Dakota" on air. Kelly Jones and Richard Jones presented the song as part of Radio 1's "10 albums to watch for 2005".

=== US radio airplay ===
"Dakota" was the first Stereophonics single to achieve success on alternative rock radio stations in the United States—where it was promoted as "Dakota (You Made Me Feel Like the One)". After its American release on 21 March 2005, the single steadily gained ground on US alternative rock radio, notably on stations such as WFNX, WBCN and KROQ-FM. "Dakota" continued to gain support across the US and eventually became the first Stereophonics song to chart on the Billboard Modern Rock Tracks chart. It first charted on 9 July 2005, almost half a year after its original release. The song peaked at number 34 on the chart and remained on the chart for six weeks. It was their first and so far only single to make the chart.

== Release ==
Four weeks before the official release of the single, "Dakota" was released exclusively on the iTunes Store. The song was also available for download from the band's website. The single was released in the United Kingdom on 28 February 2005 across four formats: a CD single, maxi single, vinyl single and DVD single. "Dakota" was included as the opening track on Stereophonics' first greatest hits compilation album Decade in the Sun.

=== Music video ===
The music video for "Dakota" was filmed in South Dakota, United States. It features Stereophonics on a road trip through Dakota on the back of a truck. As the video goes on, the band pass various Dakota sights including Mount Rushmore. The video was given an exclusive showing on MTV before it was shown on other music channels.

== Reception ==
=== Critical response ===
"Dakota" received positive reviews. AllMusic editor MacKenzie Wilson said the song had "glossy guitar hooks" when reviewing the album. Along with the songs "Brother" and "Girl" she stated that they "find Stereophonics' second coming to be a convincing one." On the "Readers 100 Greatest Tracks of 2005" at Q, "Dakota" was placed 8th. James Masterton named the song his single of the year in 2005. Alexis Petridis from The Guardian praised the song for replacing their "standard smug lumbering with an urgent synthesizer pulse" and its "breezy, radio-smashing chorus."

The song has been compared to the works of U2, with Pete Cashmore of NME criticising the song for sounding like one of their stadium songs and being "too concerned with making an impressive noise and not concerned enough with a tune."

=== Commercial performance ===
"Dakota" gave Stereophonics their first UK number one single as it topped both the Singles and Download charts. It remained in the charts for 44 weeks and ranked at number 40 on the year-end charts. It was also the band's first single to chart on the US Modern Rock Tracks chart, peaking at number 34. In Ireland the song peaked at number 8 and remained in the chart for seven weeks.

== Track listings ==
CD and 7-inch
No.	Title	Length
1.	"Dakota"
2.	"Long Way Round"

Maxi CD
No.	Title	Length
1.	"Dakota" (radio edit)
2.	"Dakota" (album version—Footswitch rework)
3.	"Soul" (demo)
4.	"Dakota"

DVD
No.	Title	Length
1.	"Dakota" (rehearsal footage) (video)
2.	"Dakota" (studio recording footage) (video)
3.	"Dakota" (audio)
4.	"Photo gallery"

== Personnel ==
Stereophonics

- Kelly Jones – vocals, guitar, piano
- Richard Jones – bass guitar
- Javier Weyler – drums

Technical

- Production – Kelly Jones, Jim Lowe
- Mixing – Kelly Jones, Jim Lowe
- Engineering – Jim Lowe

== Charts ==
=== Weekly charts ===
Chart (2005)	Peak position
Australia (ARIA)	22
Belgium (Ultratip Bubbling Under Wallonia)	18
Europe (Eurochart Hot 100)	5
Ireland (IRMA)	8
Netherlands (Single Top 100)	74
New Zealand (Recorded Music NZ)	20
Scottish Singles Sales (Official Charts)	1
Switzerland Airplay (Swiss Hitparade)	17
UK Singles (Official Charts)	1
UK Independent (Official Charts)	1
US Alternative Airplay (Billboard)	34

Chart (2012)	Peak position
Scottish Singles Sales (Official Charts)	30
UK Singles (Official Charts)	29

=== Year-end charts ===
Chart (2005)	Position
UK Singles (OCC)	40

== Certifications ==
Region	Certification	Certified units/sales
New Zealand (RMNZ)	2× Platinum	60,000^{‡}
United Kingdom (BPI)	5× Platinum	3,000,000^{‡}
^{‡} Sales+streaming figures based on certification alone.

== Release history ==
Region	Date	Format(s)	Label(s)	Ref.
United Kingdom	28 February 2005	7-inch vinyl; CD; maxi-CD; DVD	V2	
United States	21 March 2005	Triple A; alternative radio	V2	
Australia	23 May 2005	CD	V2	

== See also ==
- 2005 in British music
- List of UK Singles Chart number ones of the 2000s
