= Handbags and Gladrags =

1967 song written by Mike d'Abo

- Stateside (Australia) record cover

Single by Chris Farlowe
- B-side: "Everyone Makes a Mistake"
- Released: 17 November 1967
- Recorded: Early 1967
- Genre: Rhythm and blues, blue-eyed soul
- Length: 3:30
- Label: Immediate
- Songwriter: Mike d'Abo
- Producer: Mike d'Abo

Chris Farlowe singles chronology
"Moanin'" (1967)	"Handbags and Gladrags" (1967)	"The Last Goodbye" (1968)

"Handbags and Gladrags" is a song written in 1967 by Mike d'Abo, who was then the lead singer of Manfred Mann. D'Abo describes the song's lyrical meaning as him "preaching to a girl" who feels material success is a sign she has "arrived", and reminding her to try think about other larger and longer-lasting values, and overall to not "grow up too quickly."

The first released version of the song was by Chris Farlowe in 1967, followed by Love Affair on their The Everlasting Love Affair album in 1968, and later interpretations by Rod Stewart (1969) and Stereophonics (2001) were also commercially successful. An arrangement by Big George was the theme for The Office starting in July 2001.

In 2004, the demo tape of the original version of the song was discovered in a closet belonging to bassist Mo Foster. It was amongst a collection of studio recordings d'Abo had made in the late 1960s and early 1970s. The collection was released in 2004, on the Angel Air label, under the title Hidden Gems & Treasured Friends.

== Chris Farlowe version ==
In November 1967, singer Chris Farlowe was the first to release a version of the song, produced by Mike d'Abo. It became a #33 hit in the United Kingdom for Immediate Records. This arrangement of the song included Dave Greenslade's piano blues-scale riff. The song was included as track 13 (of 14) on Farlowe's 1969 compilation album The Last Goodbye.

== Rod Stewart version ==
"Handbags and Gladrags"

Single by Rod Stewart

from the album An Old Raincoat Won't Ever Let You Down
- B-side: "Man of Constant Sorrow"
- Released: May 1970 (US)
- Recorded: 1969
- Length: 4:24
- Label: Mercury
- Songwriter: Mike d'Abo
- Producer: Lou Reizner

Rod Stewart singles chronology
"Dirty Old Town" (1971)	"Handbags and Gladrags" (1970)	"You Wear It Well" (1972)

Audio sample
- file; help

In 1969, Rod Stewart recorded a version for the album An Old Raincoat Won't Ever Let You Down. This version of the song was arranged by Mike d'Abo, who also played piano on the recording. The song failed to garner significant sales or airplay in the United States, but when it was re-released as a single in 1972, it charted on the Billboard Hot 100, peaking at 42 in March. In 1993, Stewart recorded a live version of the song during his session for MTV Unplugged. This version was included on the album Unplugged...and Seated.

Although it was never a hit single for Stewart in the UK, in recognition of its renewed popularity following its use for television series The Office and Stereophonics returning it to the charts, he performed "Handbags and Gladrags" (backed by Phil Collins on drums) as his only song at the Party at the Palace in 2002.

The original record arrangement includes a "plaintive oboe phrasing".

Record World said Stewart "sounds fabulous."

In 1989, Rod Stewart's version of the song was used in the Season One episode of the TV series Midnight Caller entitled "No Exit".

== Chase version ==
In 1971, Bill Chase and his jazz/rock fusion group Chase recorded a version as a single. It was included on their 1971 debut album Chase. It was sung by Ted Piercefield.

== Jon English version ==
In 1973, English-born Australian musician Jon English released his version as his debut single, from his debut studio album Wine Dark Sea.

== Stereophonics version ==
"Handbags and Gladrags"

Single by Stereophonics

from the album Just Enough Education to Perform
- B-side: "First Time Ever I Saw Your Face"; "How?"
- Released: 3 December 2001
- Length: 4:46
- Label: V2
- Songwriter: Mike d'Abo
- Producers: Laurie Latham; Stereophonics

Stereophonics singles chronology
"Step on My Old Size Nines" (2001)	"Handbags and Gladrags" (2001)	"Vegas Two Times" (2002)

Music video
- "Handbags and Gladrags" on YouTube

In 2001, Welsh rock band Stereophonics released a version of the song on single. It was subsequently added to their previous album's re-release Just Enough Education to Perform as track seven and on their first compilation album as the final track. The band originally recorded their version as a demo "for a laugh", but after the record company heard it they saw the potential of it being a single and subsequently had it commissioned as one. Despite receiving criticism, it became one of their most successful singles; in Ireland, it peaked at number three, and it was certified gold in the UK.

=== Release and reception ===
"Handbags and Gladrags" was released as a single in the UK on 3 December 2001. Four different releases were made available to the public, including two CDs, 7-inch vinyl, and cassette. The first CD includes two more covers, Ewan MacColl's "First Time Ever I Saw Your Face" and John Lennon's "How?". The second CD contains live acoustic versions of "Caravan Holiday" and "Nice to be Out", both from Just Enough Education to Perform. The 7-inch vinyl only has "First Time Ever I Saw Your Face" for a B-side, as does the cassette format. A maxi-CD, released in Europe and Australia, includes all five songs. In Japan, this maxi-CD was released on 9 January 2002.

Following on from the "Mr. Writer" critical backlash, the song received a negative review from Drowned in Sound reviewer Anita Bhagwandas. Bhagwandas described it as the "final drop in the Stereophonics' inevitable descent into pop mediocrity" and criticised the group for "selling out."

=== Track listings ===
UK CD 1
No.	Title	Lyrics	Length
1.	"Handbags and Gladrags"	d'Abo
2.	"First Time Ever I Saw Your Face"	Ewan MacColl
3.	"How?"	John Lennon

UK CD 2
No.	Title	Lyrics	Length
1.	"Handbags and Gladrags" (live acoustic version)	d'Abo
2.	"Caravan Holiday" (live acoustic version)	Kelly Jones
3.	"Nice to Be Out" (live acoustic version)	Jones

UK 7-inch vinyl and cassette single
No.	Title	Lyrics	Length
1.	"Handbags and Gladrags"	d'Abo
2.	"First Time Ever I Saw Your Face"	MacColl

European, Australian, and Japanese maxi-CD
No.	Title	Lyrics	Length
1.	"Handbags and Gladrags"	d'Abo
2.	"First Time Ever I Saw Your Face"	MacColl
3.	"How?"	Lennon
4.	"Caravan Holiday" (live acoustic version)	Jones
5.	"Nice to Be Out" (live acoustic version)	Jones

=== Personnel ===
Stereophonics

- Kelly Jones – lead vocals, guitar
- Richard Jones – bass guitar
- Stuart Cable – drums

Additional

- Scott James – guitar
- Jools Holland's Rhythm and Blues Orchestra

Technical

- Production – Laurie Latham, Stereophonics
- Engineering – Latham

=== Charts ===
==== Weekly charts ====
Chart (2001–2002)	Peak position
Belgium (Ultratip Bubbling Under Flanders)	9
Europe (Eurochart Hot 100)	19
Ireland (IRMA)	3
Netherlands (Single Top 100)	57
Scottish Singles Sales (Official Charts)	3
UK Singles (Official Charts)	4
UK Indie (Official Charts)	1

==== Year-end charts ====
Chart (2001)	Position
Ireland (IRMA)	63
UK Singles (OCC)	89

Chart (2002)	Position
Ireland (IRMA)	57
UK Singles (OCC)	115

=== Certifications ===
Region	Certification	Certified units/sales
United Kingdom (BPI)	Platinum	600,000^{‡}
^{‡} Sales+streaming figures based on certification alone.

== The Office theme song ==
In 2000, a version of "Handbags and Gladrags" was specifically arranged by Big George as the theme song on the BBC series The Office. Three versions were recorded:

- a short, instrumental piece as the opening titles theme
- a short, vocal piece as the closing titles theme
- an alternative full studio version

Both vocal versions were sung by Waysted vocalist Fin Muir.

In Episode Four of Series One, a version performed by Ricky Gervais (in character as David Brent) was played over the end credits.

== Version release history ==
"Handbags and Gladrags"
Mike d'Abo (1970). The Mike D'Abo Collection, Vol I – Handbags and Gladrags. RPM (2001) via iTunes

Year	Artist	Type
1967	Chris Farlowe	Single
1967	Double Feature	Single
1968	Love Affair	Album
1969	Kate Taylor	Album & single
1969	The Rationals	Album (CREWE CR-1334)
1969	Rod Stewart	Album
1971	Chase	Album & single
1971	Gary Burton	Album
1971	Jimmy Witherspoon	Album
1973	Jon English	Single
1974	Mike d'Abo	Album
1975	Chris Farlowe	Album (Live recording)
1977	Kirka Babitzin	Album
1992	Mary Coughlan	Album
1993	Rod Stewart	Album (Acoustic recording)
2001	Stereophonics	Single
2002	Rod Stewart	Album (Live recording)
2003	Manfred Mann	Album
2004	Royal Philharmonic Orchestra	Album
2005	Chris Farlowe	Album (Live recording)
2005	Dark One Lite	Album
2007	Engelbert Humperdinck	Album
2007	Waysted	Album
2007	Jonathan Sass	Album
2008	Jackie Trent	Album
2008	Ol' Cheeky Bastards	Album
2008	Karl Jenkins	Album
