= Mr. Writer =

2001 single by Stereophonics

Single by Stereophonics

from the album Just Enough Education to Perform
- B-side: "Maritim Belle Vue in Kiel"; "An Audience with Mr. Nice"
- Released: 19 March 2001
- Studio: Real World (Bath, Somerset, England); Monnow Valley (Rockfield, Wales)
- Length: 5:19 (album version); 4:26 (edit)
- Label: V2
- Composers: Kelly Jones; Marshall Bird
- Lyricist: Kelly Jones
- Producers: Bird and Bush

Stereophonics singles chronology
"Mama Told Me Not to Come" (2000)	"Mr. Writer" (2001)	"Have a Nice Day" (2001)

Music video
- "Mr. Writer" on YouTube

"Mr. Writer" is a song by the Welsh rock band Stereophonics from their third studio album, Just Enough Education to Perform (2001). It was released as the album's lead single on 19 March 2001, reaching number five on the UK singles chart, number seven in Ireland, and number 53 in Sweden, where it was the band's first and only single to chart.

== Background ==
"Mr. Writer" is track three on Just Enough Education to Perform. In the album's booklet, vocalist Kelly Jones explained that he started writing the song around the same time that he wrote "I Stopped to Fill My Car Up", the closing track from Stereophonics' previous album, Performance and Cocktails (1999). He first came up with the verse chords, then the line "Mr. Writer, why don't you tell it like it is", at which point he stopped working on the lyrics for several months. While in Europe, Jones practiced the chords on touring musician Tony Kirkham's keyboard.

Later, at Monnow Valley Studio in Wales, Jones and songwriter-producer Marshall Bird were listening to Stevie Wonder's 1972 album Talking Book. The album's second track, "Maybe Your Baby", caught their attention due to its "really druggy lazy fucked up feel", and both men agreed to make "Mr. Writer" similar in tone. Together, they combined the "Mr. Writer" chords and "Maybe Your Baby"-inspired riffs while Jones wrote the lyrics to the first verse and bridge that night. Afterwards, producer Steve Bush completed the demo recording by providing bass guitar and drums.

The song was written as response to a journalist who had toured with the band and later gave them negative reviews. The song has been attributed as one of the factors that has caused the group's uneasy relationship with the media. In a 2008 interview with The Guardian, Jones admitted that "...every journalist thought ['Mr. Writer'] was about them. It took me 10 minutes to write and 10 years to explain."

== Versions ==
A live version from Millennium Stadium Cardiff appears on the "Vegas Two Times" single, and a live acoustic version appears as track one on CD2 on the "Mr. Writer" singles, which also includes live acoustic versions of "Hurry Up and Wait" and the Beatles' "Don't Let Me Down".

== Music video ==
The music video for the song was directed by David Slade and features clips of the band performing in a snowy globe and some other clips of the band dressed as clowns driving in a car which soon catches fire and is brutally destroyed. Then the band run off into the dusk at the end of the video.

== Track listings ==
UK CD1

1. "Mr. Writer" (edit)
2. "Maritim Belle Vue in Kiel"
3. "An Audience with Mr. Nice"

UK CD2

1. "Mr. Writer" (live acoustic version)
2. "Hurry Up and Wait" (live acoustic version)
3. "Don't Let Me Down" (live acoustic version)

UK cassette single and European CD single

1. "Mr. Writer" (edit)
2. "Maritim Belle Vue in Kiel"

Japanese CD single

1. "Mr. Writer" (edit)
2. "Mr. Writer" (live acoustic version)
3. "Don't Let Me Down" (live acoustic version)
4. "An Audience with Mr. Nice"

== Credits and personnel ==
Credits are taken from the Just Enough Education to Perform album booklet.

Studios

- Recorded at Real World Studios (Bath, Somerset, England) and Monnow Valley Studios (Rockfield, Wales)
- Mixed at Soundtrack Studios (New York City)
- Mastered at Gateway Mastering (Portland, Maine, US)

Personnel

- Bird and Bush – production, engineering
  - Marshall Bird – music, backing vocals, piano, Wurlitzer
  - Steve Bush
- Kelly Jones – words, music, vocals, guitar
- Richard Jones – bass
- Stuart Cable – drums
- Andy Wallace – mixing
- Bob Ludwig – mastering

== Charts ==
=== Weekly charts ===
Chart (2001)	Peak position
Europe (Eurochart Hot 100)	22
Ireland (IRMA)	7
Netherlands (Single Top 100)	96
Scotland Singles (Official Charts)	3
Sweden (Sverigetopplistan)	53
UK Singles (Official Charts)	5
UK Indie (Official Charts)	1

=== Year-end charts ===
Chart (2001)	Position
UK Singles (OCC)	76

== Certifications ==
Region	Certification	Certified units/sales
United Kingdom (BPI)	Gold	400,000^{‡}
^{‡} Sales+streaming figures based on certification alone.

== Release history ==
Region	Date	Format(s)	Label(s)	Ref(s).
United Kingdom	19 March 2001	CD; cassette	V2	
Japan	23 March 2001	CD	V2	
United Kingdom	26 March 2001	7-inch vinyl	V2	
United States	30 April 2001	Triple A radio	V2	
United States	1 May 2001	Alternative radio	V2	
