= Madame Helga =

2003 single by Stereophonics

Single by Stereophonics

from the album You Gotta Go There to Come Back
- B-side: "High as the Ceiling"; "Royal Flush" (demo)
- Written: 2 May 2002 (Sri Lanka)
- Released: 19 May 2003
- Recorded: September–December 2002
- Studio: Hook End Manor (Checkendon, England)
- Genre: Glam metal; gospel
- Length: 3:55
- Label: V2
- Songwriter: Kelly Jones
- Producer: Kelly Jones

Stereophonics singles chronology
"Vegas Two Times" (2002)	"Madame Helga" (2003)	"Maybe Tomorrow" (2003)

Music video
- "Madame Helga" on YouTube

"Madame Helga" is a song by Welsh rock band Stereophonics from their fourth studio album, You Gotta Go There to Come Back (2003). It was inspired by the band's stay at Helga's Folly while they were on tour in Sri Lanka in 2002. The folly is owned by Helga Desilva Blow Perera, from whom the title "Madame Helga" originated. Released as a single on 19 May 2003, the song reached number four on the UK Singles Chart and number 15 on the Irish Singles Chart the same month.

"Madame Helga" is track three on You Gotta Go There to Come Back. There is also a live version of the track on the Live from Dakota album. The music video was directed by Robert Hales. Despite being one of the band's highest-charting singles, it is not included on the standard edition of the band's 2008 greatest hits album, Decade in the Sun: Best of Stereophonics.

== Track listings ==
UK CD single

1. "Madame Helga" – 3:56
2. "High as the Ceiling" – 3:18
3. "Royal Flush" (mono demo) – 3:29

UK DVD single

1. "Madame Helga" (audio) – 3:56
2. "Madame Helga" (live video)

UK 7-inch single

A. "Madame Helga" – 3:56
B. "High as the Ceiling" – 3:18

== Credits and personnel ==
Credits are taken from the You Gotta Go There to Come Back album booklet.

Recording

- Written on 2 May 2002 in Sri Lanka
- Recorded between September and December 2002 at Hook End Manor (Checkendon, England)
- Mixed at Ocean Way (Hollywood, California)
- Mastered at Abbey Road Studios (London, England)

Personnel

- Kelly Jones – writing, vocals, guitars, production
- Richard Jones – bass, harmonica
- Stuart Cable – drums, percussion
- Andy Davies – recording assistant
- Jack Joseph Puig – mixing
- Jim Lowe – engineering
- Steve McNichol – Pro Tools engineering
- Chris Blair – mastering

== Charts ==
=== Weekly charts ===
Chart (2003)	Peak position
Europe (Eurochart Hot 100)	15
Ireland (IRMA)	15
Scotland Singles (OCC)	3
UK Singles (OCC)	4
UK Indie (OCC)	3

=== Year-end charts ===
Chart (2003)	Position
UK Singles (OCC)	187
