= Milky Chance discography =

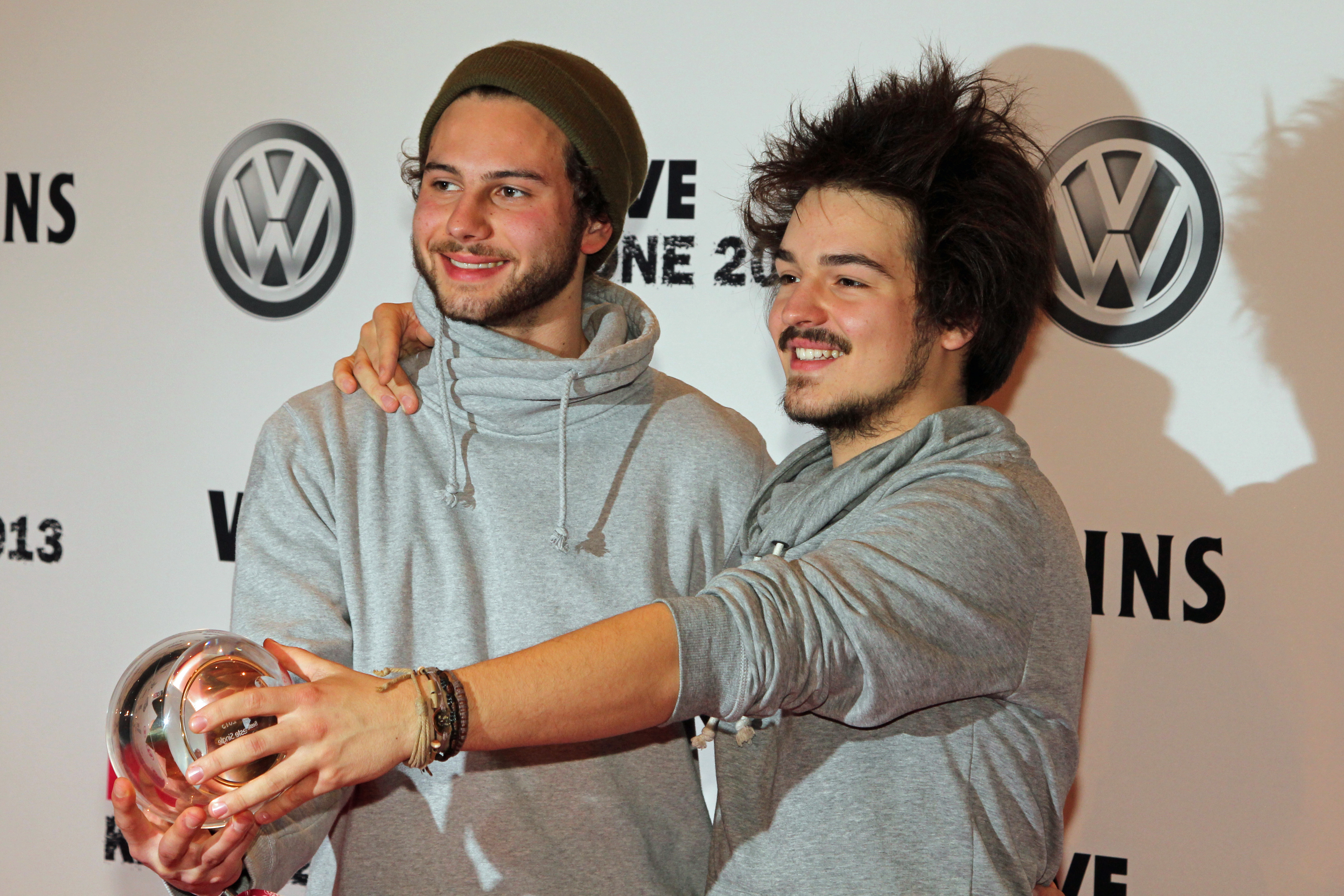
- Dausch (left) and Rehbein (right) receiving the winning trophy at the 1Live Krone Radio Awards in Germany in 2013.
- Studio albums: 4
- EPs: 2
- Singles: 18

German folk group with reggae and electronic music influences Milky Chance have released four studio albums, eighteen singles, and two extended plays.

Sadnecessary, Milky Chance's debut studio album, was released on 1 October 2013 in Germany, with singles such as "Down by the River". The album peaked at number 14 in Germany, and it charted at No. 17 on the Billboard 200 chart. In an interview with Edmonton's Sonic 102.9, the band said that it took them three years to write the song "Stolen Dance", the song was first released on their own label Lichtdicht Records on 5 April 2013 as a single and reached number one in Austria, France, Belgium (Wallonia), Switzerland, Poland, Czech Republic and Hungary. "Down by the River" was re-released as a single on 28 March 2014 in Germany through Lichtdicht Records. The song has charted in France, Germany, Switzerland and United Kingdom, and also appears in FIFA 15.

== Albums ==
=== Studio albums ===
| Title | Details | Peak chart positions | | | | | | | | | | Certifications |
| Title | Details | GER | AUS | AUT | BEL | FRA | NLD | SWE | SWI | UK | US | Certifications |
|---|---|---|---|---|---|---|---|---|---|---|---|---|
| Sadnecessary | Released: 31 May 2013; Label: Lichtdicht; Format: Digital download, CD | 14 | 8 | 23 | 15 | 5 | 51 | 25 | 14 | 36 | 17 | BVMI: Gold; ARIA: Gold; BPI: Silver; IFPI AUT: Gold; RIAA: Gold; SNEP: Gold |
| Blossom | Released: 17 March 2017; Label: Muggelig Records; Format: Digital download, CD | 5 | 8 | 12 | 67 | 77 | 40 | — | 8 | — (Note: Blossom did not enter the UK Albums Chart, but peaked at number 64 on the UK Album Downloads Chart.) | 64 | |
| Mind the Moon | Released: 15 November 2019; Label: Muggelig Records; Format: Digital download, CD, streaming | 23 | 63 | 48 | — | — | — | — | 31 | — | — | |
| Living in a Haze | Released: 9 June 2023; Label: Muggelig Records; Format: Digital download, CD, streaming | 16 | — | 22 | — | 195 | — | — | 13 | — | — (Note: Living in a Haze did not enter the Billboard 200, but peaked at number 73 on the US Album Sales chart.) | |
"—" denotes a single that did not chart or was not released in that territory.

=== Acoustic albums ===
| Title | Details |
|---|---|
| Sadnecessary (Acoustic Version) | Released: 20 April 2022; Label: Stoned in Paradise; Format: Digital download, streaming |

=== Compilation albums ===
| Title | Details | Peak chart positions |
| Title | Details | SWI |
|---|---|---|
| Trip Tape | Released: 3 November 2021; Label: Muggelig; Format: Digital download, streaming; Covers, demos and remixes | — |
| Trip Tape II | Released: 6 October 2022; Label: Muggelig; Format: Digital download, streaming; Covers, demos and remixes | 64 |
| Trip Tape III | Released: 10 September 2025; Label: Muggelig; Format: Digital download, streaming; Covers, live tracks, new songs | — |

== Extended plays ==
| Title | Details | Peak chart positions | |
| Title | Details | US | US Heat |
|---|---|---|---|
| Stolen Dance EP | Released: 9 May 2013; Label: Lichtdicht; Format: Digital download | 181 | 5 |
| Stay Home Sessions | Released: 17 April 2020; Label: Muggelig; Format: Digital download, streaming | — | — |

== Singles ==
List of singles, with selected chart positions and certifications shown
| Title | Year | Peak chart positions | | | | | | | | | | Certifications | Album |
| Title | Year | GER | AUS | AUT | BEL | CAN | FRA | NZ | SWI | UK | US | Certifications | Album |
|---|---|---|---|---|---|---|---|---|---|---|---|---|---|
| "Stolen Dance" | 2013 | 2 | 2 | 1 | 1 | 7 | 1 | 3 | 1 | 24 | 39 | BVMI: Platinum; ARIA: 4× Platinum; BPI: Platinum; BRMA: Gold; IFPI AUT: 2× Platinum; MC: Diamond; RIAA: 5× Platinum; RMNZ: 7× Platinum; SNEP: Platinum | Sadnecessary |
| "Down by the River" | 2014 | 39 | — | — | — (Note: "Down by the River" did not enter the Flanders Ultratop 50, but peaked at four on the Ultratip chart.) | — | 64 | — | 55 | 79 | — | BPI: Silver; MC: Gold; RIAA: Gold; RMNZ: Platinum | Sadnecessary |
| "Flashed Junk Mind" | 2014 | 73 | 51 | — | — (Note: "Flashed Junk Mind" did not enter the Flanders Ultratop 50, but peaked at 26 on the Ultratip chart.) | — | — | — | — | — | — | BPI: Silver; IFPI AUT: Gold; RIAA: Gold; RMNZ: Platinum | Sadnecessary |
| "Cocoon" | 2016 | 34 | 10 | 40 | — (Note: "Cocoon" did not enter the Flanders Ultratop 50, but peaked at 13 on the Ultratip chart.) | — | — | — (Note: "Cocoon" did not enter the NZ Top 40 Singles Chart, but peaked at number five on the NZ Heatseeker Singles Chart.) | 86 | — | — | BVMI: Gold; ARIA: Platinum; IFPI AUT: Gold; MC: Platinum; RIAA: Gold; RMNZ: Gold | Blossom |
| "Doing Good" | 2017 | — | — | — | — | — | — | — | — | — | — | | Blossom |
| "Blossom" | 2017 | — | — | — | — | — | — | — | — | — | — | | Blossom |
| "Ego" | 2017 | — | — | — | — | — | — | — | — | — | — | | Blossom |
| "Bad Things" | 2017 | — | — | — | — | — | — | — | — | — | — | | Blossom |
| "Daydreaming" (with Tash Sultana) | 2019 | — | — | — | — | — | — | — (Note: "Daydreaming" did not enter the NZ Top 40 Singles Chart, but peaked at number 16 on the NZ Hot Singles Chart.) | — | — | — | | Mind the Moon |
| "The Game" | 2019 | — | — | — | — | — | — | — (Note: "The Game" did not enter the NZ Top 40 Singles Chart, but peaked at number 36 on the NZ Hot Singles Chart.) | — (Note: "The Game" did not enter the Swiss Singles chart, but charted at number 68 on the Swiss Airplay chart.) | — | — | | Mind the Moon |
| "Fado" | 2019 | — | — | — | — | — | — | — (Note: "Fado" did not enter the NZ Top 40 Singles Chart, but peaked at number 31 on the NZ Hot Singles Chart.) | — | — | — | | Mind the Moon |
| "Rush" (with Témé Tan) | 2019 | — | — | — | — | — | — | — | — | — | — | | Mind the Moon |
| "Don't Let Me Down" (with Jack Johnson) | 2020 | — | — | — | — (Note: "Don't Let Me Down" did not enter the Flanders Ultratop 50, but charted as an "extra tip" on the Ultratip chart.) | — | — | — (Note: "Don't Let Me Down" did not enter the NZ Top 40 Singles Chart, but peaked at number 22 on the NZ Hot Singles Chart.) | — (Note: "Don't Let Me Down" did not enter the Swiss Singles chart, but charted at number 54 on the Swiss Airplay chart.) | — | — | | Non-album single |
| "Colorado" | 2021 | 28 | — | 18 | — | — (Note: "Colorado" did not enter the Billboard Canadian Hot 100, but peaked at number 37 on the Canadian Digital Song Sales chart.) | — | — (Note: "Colorado" did not enter the NZ Top 40 Singles Chart, but peaked at number 36 on the NZ Hot Singles Chart.) | 83 | — | — | BVMI: Gold; IFPI AUT: Platinum; MC: Gold | Trip Tape |
| "Unknown Song" (with Paulina Eisenberg) | 2022 | — | — | — | — | — | — | — | — | — | — | | Non-album single |
| "Synchronize" | 2022 | — (Note: "Synchronize" did not enter the German Singles Chart, but peaked at number 15 on the Deutsche Single Trend Chart.) | — | — | — | — | — | — | — (Note: "Synchronize" did not enter the Swiss Singles chart, but charted at number 36 on the Swiss Airplay chart.) | — | — | IFPI AUT: Gold | Trip Tape II |
| "Troubled Man" | 2022 | — | — | — | — | — | — | — | — | — | — | | Trip Tape II |
| "Living in a Haze" | 2023 | 42 | — | 16 | — | 58 | — | — | 67 | — | — | IFPI AUT: Gold; MC: Gold | Living in a Haze |
| "Golden" | 2023 | — | — | — | — | — | — | — | — | — | — | | Living in a Haze |
| "Purple Tiger" | 2023 | — | — | — | — | — | — | — | — | — | — | | Living in a Haze |
| "History of Yesterday" (with Charlotte Cardin) | 2023 | — | — | — | — | — | — | — | — | — | — | | Living in a Haze |
| "Reckless Child" | 2024 | — | — | — | — | — | — | — | — | — | — | | TBA |
| "Naked and Alive" | 2024 | — | — | — | — | — | — | — | — | — | — | | TBA |
| "Camouflage" | 2025 | — | — | — | — | — | — | — | — | — | — | | TBA |
"—" denotes a single that did not chart or was not released in that territory.

== Other charted songs ==
| Title | Year | Peak chart positions | | | Album |
| Title | Year | CAN | FRA | US Rock | Album |
|---|---|---|---|---|---|
| "Stunner" | 2013 | 70 | — | 31 | Sadnecessary |
| "Sadnecessary" | 2013 | 55 | — | 26 | Sadnecessary |
| "Fairytale" | 2013 | — | 96 | — | Sadnecessary |
