= Marcus Russell =

English music manager and founder of Ignition Management

Marcus Russell is the manager of Oasis, and numerous other rock bands, musicians and singer-songwriters. He serves as the managing director of both Ignition Management and Ignition Records, as well as managing director of Big Brother Recordings.

Born in Ebbw Vale, South Wales, on the 22 of May 1953, Russell was educated at Ebbw Vale County Grammar School from 1964 to 1971. He then worked as a blast furnace operative for British Steel at Ebbw Vale Works and for NCB at Waun-y-Pound open cast coal mine between 1971 and 1974. In 1974, he left South Wales to study at Middlesex Polytechnic. Russell went on to teach at comprehensive schools in Harlow, Essex, before becoming Head of Economics at Royal Liberty School in Romford, Essex, in 1983.

In 1984, Russell left the teaching profession to set up his own management company in the music industry, naming it Ignition. Early clients included Latin Quarter, consisting of fellow Ebbw Valian lyricist Mike Jones. Subsequent clients included Johnny Marr (The Smiths), Bernard Sumner (New Order) and Neil and Tim Finn (Crowded House). In May 1993, he signed a then unknown Manchester band, Oasis. Russell managed Oasis for 16 years to become Britain's most successful rock band of the last four decades.

Following the split of Oasis in 2009, Ignition has continued to manage Noel Gallagher, overseeing the launch of his highly successful 15-year solo career as Noel Gallagher's High Flying Birds. Since the mid-2000s, Ignition's roster has grown further, taking on highly successful international touring artists such as Catfish and the Bottlemen and Scottish singer-songwriter Amy Macdonald. Ignition Management has also expanded to establish a North American arm based in Los Angeles, whose clients include Wilderado and Sunday 1994.

Russell also co-owns Ignition Records, which has been highly active with releases over the last decade from UK no.1 album bands such as Stereophonics and Courteeners. In November 2016, Russell invested, with his Ignition co-founder, in ticket resale platform Twickets. Additionally, he became owner and major benefactor of Ebbw Vale Rugby Club from 1996 to 2004, during the advent of the professional rugby union era.
