= Latin Quarter discography =

- Studio albums: 10
- Compilation albums: 3
- Singles: 30
- Video albums: 2

This is the discography of British band Latin Quarter.

== Albums ==
=== Studio albums ===
Title	Album details	Peak chart positions				
Title	Album details	UK	AUS	GER	SWE	SWI
Modern Times	Released: September 1985; Label: Rockin' Horse; Formats: CD, LP, MC	91	97	24	28	—
Mick and Caroline	Released: January 1987; Label: Rockin' Horse; Formats: CD, LP, MC	96	—	20	12	26
Swimming Against the Stream	Released: April 1989; Label: RCA; Formats: CD, LP, MC	—	—	38	50	—
Long Pig	Released: August 1993; Label: Cloud Nine; Formats: CD	—	—	—	—	—
Bringing Rosa Home	Released: February 1997; Label: SPV; Formats: CD	—	—	—	—	—
Ocean Head	Released: 17 February 2012; Label: Westpark Music; Formats: CD, digital download	—	—	—	—	—
Tilt	Released: 26 March 2014; Label: Westpark Music; Formats: CD, digital download	—	—	—	—	—
The Imagination of Thieves	Released: 16 September 2016; Label: Westpark Music; Formats: CD, LP, digital download	—	—	—	—	—
Pantomime of Wealth	Released: 13 April 2018; Label: Westpark Music; Formats: CD, LP, digital download	—	—	—	—	—
Releasing the Sheep	Released: 29 October 2021; Label: Westpark Music; Formats: CD, LP, digital download	—	—	—	—	—
"—" denotes releases that did not chart or were not released in that territory.

=== Compilation albums ===
Title	Album details
Nothing Like Velvet	Released: October 1990; Label: RCA; Formats: CD, LP, MC; Includes unreleased material and remixed and re-recorded material
Radio Africa	Released: 1990; Label: Powerworld; Formats: CD
Radio Africa	Released: 1997; Label: Camden/BMG; Formats: CD; Different from 1990 compilation

=== Video albums ===
Title	Album details
Live from London	Released: December 1986; Label: RCA/Columbia Pictures; Formats: VHS; Reissued on DVD as Live at the Town and Country Club
Live at Full House Rock Show	Released: 28 August 2006; Label: Wienerworld; Formats: DVD

== Singles ==
Title	Year	Peak chart positions				Album
Title	Year	UK	AUS	IRE	NL	Album
"Radio Africa"	1984	—	—	—	—	Modern Times
"Toulouse"	1985	93	—	—	—	Modern Times
"Radio Africa" (1st re-release)	1985	76	—	—	37	Modern Times
"The New Millionaires"	1985	—	—	—	—	Modern Times
"No Rope as Long as Time"	1985	—	—	—	—	Modern Times
"Radio Africa" (2nd re-release)	1986	19	93	17	—	Modern Times
"Modern Times"	1986	85	—	—	—	Modern Times
"America for Beginners"	1986	99	—	—	—	Modern Times
"No Rope as Long as Time" (re-release)	1986	—	—	—	—	Modern Times
"Truth About John" (Australia-only release)	1986	—	—	—	—	Modern Times
"Nomzamo (One People One Cause)"	1987	73	—	—	—	Mick and Caroline
"I Together"	1987	—	—	—	—	Mick and Caroline
"Swimming Against the Stream"	1989	—	—	—	—	Swimming Against the Stream
"Blameless" (Europe-only release)	1989	—	—	—	—	Swimming Against the Stream
"Dominion" (Germany-only release)	1989	—	—	—	—	Swimming Against the Stream
"Truth About John" (Germany-only release)	1990	—	—	—	—	Nothing Like Velvet
"Radio Africa" (remix; Germany-only release)	1991	—	—	—	—	Nothing Like Velvet
"Bitter to the South" (Germany-only release)	1992	—	—	—	—	Long Pig
"Like a Miracle" (Germany-only release)	1993	—	—	—	—	Long Pig
"Phil Ochs" (Germany-only release)	1993	—	—	—	—	Long Pig
"Angel" (Germany-only release)	1997	—	—	—	—	Bringing Rosa Home
"Surprised?" (Germany-only release)	1998	—	—	—	—	Bringing Rosa Home
"Branded" (Germany-only release)	1998	—	—	—	—	Bringing Rosa Home
"If I Believed in God"	2011	—	—	—	—	Ocean Head
"Even Superman"	2011	—	—	—	—	Ocean Head
"Marianne"	2014	—	—	—	—	Tilt
"Nico"	2014	—	—	—	—	Tilt
"Remember"	2014	—	—	—	—	Non-album single
"I Am Refugee"	2015	—	—	—	—	The Imagination of Thieves
"You and Me"	2017	—	—	—	—	The Imagination of Thieves
"MAGA: A Very Stable Genius"	2020	—	—	—	—	Releasing the Sheep
"—" denotes releases that did not chart or were not released in that territory.
