= Chapel Club =

English indie-synthpop band

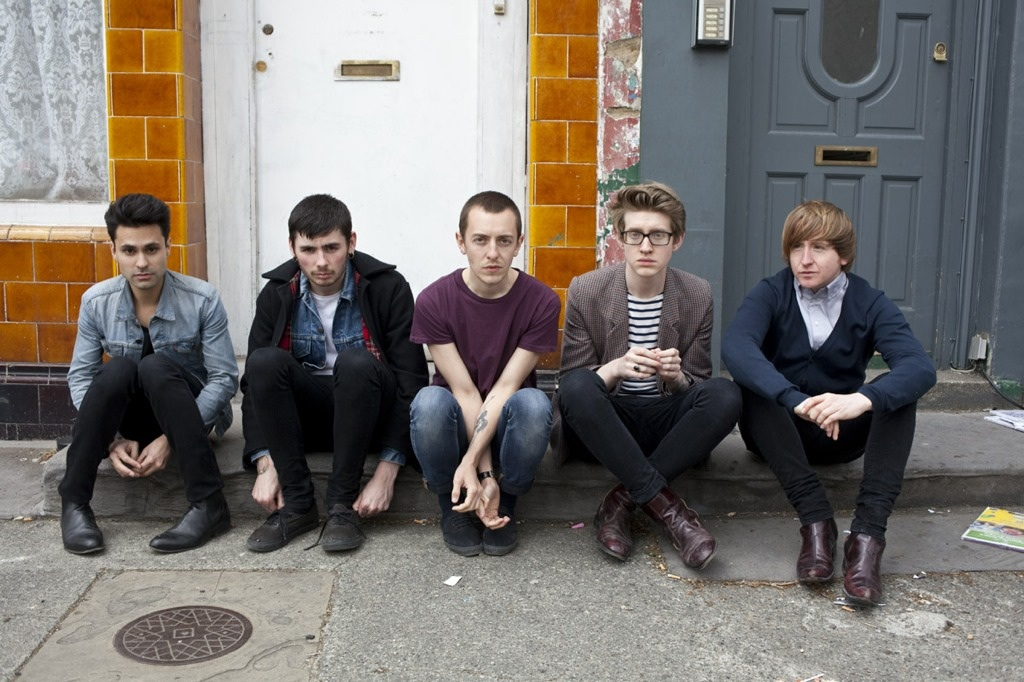

Background information
- Origin: London, England
- Genres: Synthpop, indie rock, post-punk
- Years active: 2007–2013
- Labels: Polydor (2009–2012); Ignition Records (2013)
- Members: Lewis Bowman; Michael Hibbert; Liam Arklie; Alex Parry; Rich Mitchell

Chapel Club were an English indie-synthpop band from London, consisting of singer Lewis Bowman, drummer Rich Mitchell, bassist Liam Arklie and keyboardists/guitarists Michael Hibbert and Alex Parry.

The band parted ways with Universal imprint Polydor in March 2012 after ditching their previous indie rock sound, which had previously seen the band described as "moody, majestic and magnificent" for an electronic synth/sample led pop approach. The band's second and final album was released on Ignition Management imprint Ignition Records in 2013.

The band announced their split on 17 October 2013 onstage at St Pancras Old Church, London.

== Formation ==
The band was formed by ex-Hope of the States/Troubles guitarist Michael Eran Hibbert in early 2007. Following the split of Troubles, Hibbert re-located to London from Harlow, Essex and started writing new material. Hibbert first recruited bassist Liam Arklie who had re-located to London from Swindon and was playing in local bands. Several months later the duo enlisted Lewis Bowman, who had previously been involved in putting on club nights and DJing and was a friend of a friend. Bowman wrote poetry, but had never previously sung in a band or written song lyrics. He was asked if he wanted to try writing for the band and was given several instrumental demos and asked to come up with vocal melodies and lyrics for them. When he recorded the fruits of his efforts at Hibbert's flat a week later, the latter was impressed enough that he immediately asked Bowman to join the band. Soon after, Arklie's best friend, guitarist Alex Parry joined and the band's line-up was completed with the addition of ex-Summum Bonum and Dogs drummer Rich Mitchell from Birkenshaw, West Yorkshire.

== Career ==
Initially named Palace, the newly formed five-piece began rehearsing and gigging around London. As another band was already using the name Palace, the band changed their name to Golden Age before they stopped gigging to focus on writing and recording.

In August 2009, the band recorded 'Surfacing' with US producer Chris Zane at Strongrooms Studio in Shoreditch, London. With their debut single finally recorded, the band, having struggled to choose a new name for the band, settled on Chapel Club, inspired by Bowman's interest in religion and religious imagery and by the proximity of the band's rehearsal space to St. Luke's Church on London's Old Street. The single was scheduled for release in October through their management's label East City Records, however despite being named BBC Radio 1 DJ Zane Lowe's 'Hottest Record in the World' and gaining radio play on stations including BBC Radio 1, BBC Radio 2, BBC 6Music, XFM and NME Radio, the single was cancelled due to a copyright issue regarding the chorus lyrics from the song "Dream a Little Dream of Me". The copyright wrangle was later resolved with the original song's publisher, allowing the band to release the song in the future.

Autumn 2009 saw Chapel Club's first gigs under their new name, as they hosted their own residency at the Shacklewell Arms pub in Dalston, London. The gigs attracted significant media attention that led to interest from several independent and major record labels. In November 2009 and after just 3 gigs under their new name, the band signed with Universal Records imprint Polydor. The band denied press reports that they had signed for large amounts of cash, claiming that their deal favoured creative control and long-term commitment over financial reward. In the same month, the band recorded 'O Maybe I' with Claudius Mittendorfer, at Atomic Heart Studios in New York. The song was recorded and produced in a day and a half. The single, now serving as the band's debut single, was released in February 2010 on Polydor on 7" and digitally via the band's own website. The single was named Zane Lowe's 'Hottest Record in the World' as well as 'Record of the Week' on Steve Harris' XFM show.

In April 2010, having tried out several producers, the band began work on their debut album with Paul Epworth at The Pool in South London. The album sessions produced a further eight tracks, including follow up single, 'Five Trees' which was released in May 2010 entered the NME chart at number six. The album was mixed and mastered in June, but release was delayed due to Polydor wanting the band to go out on tour to build up a fanbase first. Throughout the summer, the band played a host of UK and European festivals including Glastonbury, Reading and Leeds, Oxford Truck Festival, Middlesbrough Music Live, Sheffield Tramlines, Jersey Live, Belgium's Pukkelpop, Germany's Haldern Pop, Sweden's Way Out West and a headline slot on the second stage at London's Field Day festival.

In September 2010, the band embarked on the NME Emerge Radar Tour, playing alongside The Joy Formidable. The band's next single 'All The Eastern Girls' was released in October, before the band embarked on a support tour with Two Door Cinema Club in November/December across Europe. In November 2010 the band announced they were to release a limited edition 12" EP of previously unreleased songs entitled the Wintering EP in December that would only be available at their 9 December 2010 gig at St Philip's Church. The new songs revealed a sparser sound and what Bowman called 'Imagist' lyrics.

The band's debut album, "Palace" was released on 31 January 2011, with special edition CD and vinyl releases being bundled with The Wintering EP.

In February 2011, Hibbert stated that the band had demoed four songs for their second album and that it would be similar in style to the Wintering EP, that "I want to get the second album done quickly because I know it's going to have a lot of elements like that on it". In September 2011 the band posted a demo of new song 'Waterlight Park' online, a song similar in style to the material from the 'Wintering EP' and was set to feature on the band's next album.

The band premiered new songs 'Shy' and 'New Colours' during their summer festival run, which incorporated synths whilst retaining electric guitars, bass and acoustic drums. In October 2011 the band embarked on a UK tour which saw them performing two sets, the first of which featured entirely new material including songs 'Burt Reynolds', 'Your Lawn' and 'Old House' that introduced the band's new pop synth lead sound, that featured electronic drums and no guitar. Despite recording their debut album over 2 years after forming and the songs being "written over a long period of time", Bowman dismissed the band's previously released material as having been written when the band were "still learning how to write songs together" and claimed that "we formed and were signed so quickly that we never really talked about what kind of band we wanted to be". Drummer Rich Mitchell had previously stated that prior to recording their debut album, the band were holed up in the studio and "said we're going to get this right before we go out playing any gigs. I know a lot of bands go out there and play as many gigs as they can but we wanted to make sure we were happy with everything, that it was perfect. We spent a year in the studio just rehearsing and writing ". Bowman also later added that he believed the band's debut album "wasn't inventive enough" and was "emotionally full but unsubtle and unsurprising".

In January 2012, the band recorded their second album in Los Angeles with producer Tom Biller. However, the band were dropped by Universal shortly after completion and the band later revealed that the label didn't want to fund the recording and tried to withdraw the band's advance to record the album five days before the band were set to fly to Los Angeles to record.

In June 2012, now unsigned and having seemingly scrapped much of the previously premiered new material, the band posted new single 'Sleep Alone' on SoundCloud, along with forthcoming album tracks 'Scared', 'Good Together' and 'Jenny Baby' which saw the band develop their new synth based pop sound further. The songs featured electronic drums, no electric guitar and minimal bass.

On 29 October 2012 it was confirmed that the band had signed to Ignition Records, a label newly set up by Ignition Management co-owner Alec McKinlay.

The band released the first single proper, title track 'Good Together', from their second album on 20 January 2013. On 7 May the band streamed the new album 'Good Together' via nme.com, with Bowman proclaiming "Forgive us while we purge the CC fanbase of dopamine-soaked post-punk nostalgists. Back to normal service shortly." The band's long delayed album was released 3 June.

Bowman later stated that the change in sound was a "deliberate attempt to say, OK everyone said we were this and we were that, but we were only that because we hadn't really thought about what we wanted to be, so let's try and do something fresh and playful and adventurous and different". Hibbert admitted that the band's debut album not selling as well as they'd hoped "was actually kind of freeing, it meant that this sound hasn't been massively successful for us and a lot of people had written us off with some negative feelings around the band when we were touring the album towards the end, but I think we started to realise that we were in a good position to change our sound". In August 2013, Alex Parry dismissed negative reactions to the new material, claiming that there was "a clear divide between the more progressive minded and the fans that wanted a repeat of the first album. There has been a backlash I guess, but it's been pretty easy to ignore".

Despite claiming to be working on new material in September 2013 and describing it as "very soul and RnB and hiphop; loops and samples and my vocals all sound like George Michael 'Older' era", it had previously been rumoured that the band were set to split imminently and the band announced their split on 17 October 2013 onstage at the intimate 100 capacity St Pancras Old Church, London. When the band announced the gig on 30 August as a "super special, one off show", they commented that they were "very excited about this one, and it could get emotional".

== Post-split ==
On 20 October 2013, Lewis Bowman uploaded new material to SoundCloud under the name 'Gratitude', describing the material as "lo-fi love songs 4 the dazed & downhearted" and "midnight folk for midnight folk". On 2 November 2013, Bowman posted on Twitter "now that the whole affair is over & done with, I have listened to Palace and can actually confirm it's pretty good. Sorry for hating on it".

Seemingly abandoning the music industry, Bowman now works as a copywriter for companies such as Burberry, eBay and dunhill.

Although the band's statement confirming their split suggested they would all continue producing music, as of April 2018 no band member has so far released new material commercially nor performed live.

== Members ==
- Lewis James Bowman - vocals (born 1981 in Greenwich, London)
- Michael Eran Hibbert - keyboards/guitar (born 1982 in Harlow, Essex)
- Liam Carl Arklie - bass (born 1989 in Swindon, Wiltshire)
- Alexander David Parry - keyboards/guitar (born 1988 in Oldham, Greater Manchester)
- Richard Paul Mitchell - drums (born 1985 in Bradford, West Yorkshire).

== Discography ==
=== Studio albums ===
List of albums, showing year released and chart placement
Year	Album details	Peak chart positions
Year	Album details	UK
2011	Palace: Released: 31 January 2011; Label: Polydor Records; Formats: CD, Digital Download, Vinyl	31
2013	Good Together: Released: 3 June 2013; Label: Ignition Records; Formats: CD, Digital Download, Vinyl	—

=== Singles ===
List of singles, showing year released and album name
Year	Single	Peak chart positions	Album
Year	Single	UK	Album
2010	"O Maybe I" (Vinyl only)	—	Palace
2010	"Five Trees"	—	Palace
2010	"All the Eastern Girls"	148	Palace
2011	"Surfacing"	—	Palace
2011	"Blind"	—	Palace
2013	"Good Together" (Digital only)	—	Good Together
2013	"Shy" (Digital only)	—	Good Together
2013	"Wordy" (Digital only)	—	Good Together

=== Promotional singles ===
List of single, showing year and album name
Year	Single	Album
2010	"Don't Look Down" (Vinyl only) ^{[A]}	
2010	"The Shore" ^{[B]}	Palace

Notes:

- ^{A} – The single was released in April as part of Record Store Day and as such was limited in copies.
- ^{B} – The single was released as a free download from their website to promote the release of Palace.
