= Keep the Village Alive =

Studio album by Stereophonics
- Released: 11 September 2015
- Recorded: July 2011 – December 2014
- Studios: ICP Studios (Brussels, Belgium); Stylus Studios (London)
- Genre: Rock
- Length: 40:35
- Label: Stylus
- Producers: Kelly Jones; Jim Lowe

Stereophonics chronology
Graffiti on the Train (2013)	Keep the Village Alive (2015)	Scream Above the Sounds (2017)

Singles from Keep the Village Alive
- 1. "C'est la Vie" Released: 12 May 2015; 2. "I Wanna Get Lost with You" Released: 21 July 2015; 3. "Song for the Summer" Released: 27 November 2015; 4. "White Lies" Released: 19 February 2016; 5. "Mr and Mrs Smith" Released: 24 June 2016

Keep the Village Alive is the ninth studio album by Welsh rock band Stereophonics. Released on 11 September 2015, it was produced by lead singer and guitarist Kelly Jones, along with Jim Lowe. It is intended to be the second of two album volumes, with its predecessor Graffiti on the Train being the first. It is the first album to feature Jamie Morrison, who joined during the production of Graffiti on the Train in 2012. Keep the Village Alive was met with a similar positive response as Graffiti on the Train and topped the UK Albums Chart, becoming the band's first to do so since Pull the Pin (2007).

== Background ==
During the writing process for the band's previous album Graffiti on the Train (2013), Kelly Jones had written 40 song ideas, 30 of which were recorded and completed. With the intention of releasing an album trilogy, the band decided against this idea after Green Day released their ¡Uno! ¡Dos! ¡Tré! series, instead planning to release another album with ten songs. Tracks from these sessions were included in Keep the Village Alive, though these track names are not stated. Stereophonics had finished their Graffiti on the Train Tour on 28 November 2013 and in late February 2014 they went into the studio to start working on the album.

== Writing and recording ==
Speaking about "I Wanna Get Lost With You", Kelly Jones mentioned the track is about "wanting to lose yourself personally, and lose yourself with somebody, and then just literally get out there." Jones came up with the melody for "Song for the Summer" while sleeping in the studio after listening to another track for half a day. The next day he wrote the lyrics in a short time and it took 45 minutes to record. Jones approved the album for mass production on 22 June 2015.

== Promotion and release ==
After the band decided against the album trilogy, the following album was due to be released some point between the release of Graffiti on the Train and January 2014. Kelly Jones tweeted in late September 2014 that the album had been mixed and was to be released in autumn 2015 and have new songs released in May. True to their word, it was later announced in May 2015 that a new song ("C'est la Vie") would be released a day later and the album on 11 September 2015. This harkens back to when Stereophonics' studio albums were released every two years from Word Gets Around (1997) to Keep Calm and Carry On (2009). Between the final mix and lead single release, the band played the opening night of the Teenage Cancer Trust 2015 concert – during this they debuted three new songs from this album: "C'est la Vie", "Song for the Summer" and "I Wanna Get Lost With You".

On 17 July Gigwise announced the next single from the album would be "I Wanna Get Lost With You" and they would have an exclusive showing of the band's music video for it on 20 July; a trailer for the video was released on the day of announcement.

=== Singles ===
The lead-single from the album, "C'est la Vie", was first played on The Chris Evans Breakfast Show and was released the following day. A music video was released the same day on Stereophonics' Vevo channel, it was directed by Kelly Jones with cinematography by John Conroy and stars Antonia Thomas, Aneurin Barnard and Mathew Aubrey. The second single, "I Wanna Get Lost With You", was released on 21 July 2015 – the music video was released the day before, starring Barnard and Sophie Kennedy Clark. The third single, "Song for the Summer", was released on 27 November 2015 but the music video was uploaded to the band's YouTube channel a month before and stars only them. "White Lies" was released as the fourth single on 19 February 2016, the music video was uploaded to YouTube a day before, directed by Jones and features the band performing live at one of their December 2015 shows.

On its release, "Song for the Summer" peaked at number 96 on the UK Singles Chart, at number 39 on Flanders Tip and on UK Independent at 38.

== Critical response ==
Professional ratings
Aggregate scores
Source	Rating
AnyDecentMusic?	6.1/10
Metacritic	63/100
Review scores
Source	Rating
AllMusic	3/5 stars
Clash	6/10
Classic Rock	3.5/5 stars
Drowned in Sound	6/10
The Independent	2/5 stars
Mojo	3/5 stars
musicOMH	3/5 stars
Q	3/5 stars
PopMatters	8/10
Uncut	3/5 stars

Keep the Village Alive has received generally favourable reviews. At Metacritic, which assigns a weighted average rating out of 100 to reviews from mainstream critics, the album received an average score of 63 based on 10 reviews. Jedd Beaudoin of PopMatters gave a four-star review of the album and called it an "impressive yield of ace tracks" while complimenting they sound "as fresh as anything the Phonics have done in the entirety of their career." In his review for Drowned in Sound, Dan Lucas praised several of the tracks, stating they "make this the best Stereophonics album since You Gotta Go There to Come Back" while calling the album as a whole a variety of "straightforward piano, [...] rhythms [...] electric and acoustic guitars."

In a mixed response for Clash Music, Luke Winstanley summarised the album as "enjoyable and solid, if unadventurous rock record anchored, as always, by that tremendous voice." Senior Editor for AllMusic, Stephen Thomas Erlewine declared the opening track "comes crashing out of the gates" but summarised "the power trio still trades on the hybrids of Coldplay and U2". In a much less enthusiastic review, Andy Gill from The Independent regarded Kelly Jones' writing "bereft of inspiration [...] with insipid lyric clichés".

== Track listing ==
All tracks are written by Kelly Jones.

No.	Title	Length
1.	"C'est la Vie"	3:41
2.	"White Lies"	3:57
3.	"Sing Little Sister"	3:27
4.	"I Wanna Get Lost with You"	3:50
5.	"Song for the Summer"	2:56
6.	"Fight or Flight"	3:42
7.	"My Hero"	3:48
8.	"Sunny"	4:20
9.	"Into the World"	4:04
10.	"Mr and Mrs Smith"	6:50
Total length:		40:35

Deluxe Edition (Disc two) – Bonus Tracks
No.	Title	Length
1.	"Ancient Rome"	4:41
2.	"Let Me In"	4:28
3.	"Blame (You Never Give Me Your Money)"	4:43
4.	"You Are My Energy"	3:58
5.	"You're My Star" (acoustic 2015)	5:24
6.	"I Wanna Get Lost With You" (acoustic 2015)	4:15
Total length:		27:29

Notes

- "You're My Star" was originally released in 2008 on Decade in the Sun: Best of Stereophonics.

== Personnel ==
Stereophonics

- Kelly Jones – lead vocals, guitar, piano
- Richard Jones – bass guitar
- Adam Zindani – guitar, backing vocals
- Jamie Morrison – drums

Additional

- Sam Yapp – drums (tracks 1, 8)
- Javier Weyler – drums (bonus tracks 1–4)
- Mikey Rowe – Wurly (track 5)
- Jim Lowe – additional Hammond (track 1), programming
- Neil Cowley – additional piano (track 2)
- Tony Kirkham – additional piano, Hammond (tracks 7, 10, bonus track 6)
- Rosie Danvers – cello (bonus track 5)
- Helen Hathorn – violin (bonus track 5)
- Emma Owens – viola (bonus track 5)
- David Arnold with Kelly Jones – orchestral arrangements (tracks 5–9)
- Nicholas Dodd – orchestration

Technical

- Production – Kelly Jones, Jim Lowe
- Engineering – Lowe
- Mixing – Craig Silvey
- Studio Assistant at ICP Studios – Paul Edouard-Laurendeau
- Mastering – Greg Calbi

Orchestra

- Leader – John Bradbury
- Violin section (tracks 5–8) – Eos Chater, Dorina Markoff, John Bradbury, Johnathan Strange, Oli Langford, Christina Emanuel, Tom Pigott-Smith, Jackie Hartley, Peter Hanson, Ralph De Souza, Johnathan Rees, David Woodcock, Debbie Widdup, Natalia Bonner
- Viola section (tracks 5–8) –Reiad Chibah, Julia Knight, Sue Dench, Nick Barr
- Cello section (tracks 5–8) – Nick Cooper, Chris Worsey, Adrian Bradbury, Frank Schaefer
- Tuba (tracks 6, 8) – Pete Smith
- Bass trombone (tracks 6, 8) – Roger Argente
- Tenor trombone (tracks 6, 8) – Andy Wood
- French horns (tracks 6, 8) – Phillip Eastop, Mike Murray, Corinne Bailey, Martin Owen
- B♭ Trumpet (tracks 6, 8) – Daniel Newell, Jason Evans, Andy Cowley, Amos Miller
- Violin (track 9) – Eos Chater
- Cello (track 9) – Gay-Yee Westerhoff
- Viola (track 9) – Nick Barr

== Charts and certifications ==
=== Weekly charts ===
Chart (2015)	Peak position
Australian Albums (ARIA)	39
Austrian Albums (Ö3 Austria)	36
Belgian Albums (Ultratop Flanders)	50
Belgian Albums (Ultratop Wallonia)	96
Dutch Albums (Album Top 100)	22
French Albums (SNEP)	37
German Albums (Offizielle Top 100)	49
Irish Albums (IRMA)	14
Italian Albums (FIMI)	51
Scottish Albums (Official Charts)	1
Swiss Albums (Schweizer Hitparade)	30
UK Albums (Official Charts)	1
UK Independent Albums (Official Charts)	1
US Heatseekers Albums (Billboard)	17

=== Year-end charts ===
Chart (2015)	Position
UK Albums (OCC)	39

=== Certifications ===
Region	Certification	Certified units/sales
United Kingdom (BPI)	Gold	194,559

== Release history ==
Region	Date	Version	Format	Label
United Kingdom	11 September 2015	Standard edition; deluxe edition	CD; vinyl; digital download	Stylus Records (Note: Stylus Records is under exclusive license to Ignition Records Ltd. This is stated on the back of the Graffiti on the Train vinyl cover and its singles.)
