= Baby Strange =

Scottish indie rock band

- Origin: Glasgow
- Genres: Indie rock; Punk rock; Rock
- Years active: 2012–2023
- Labels: Ignition
- Past members: Johnny Madden (vocals/guitar); Jake McGregor (flute); Connaire McCann (drums); Aidan McCann (bass)

Baby Strange were a Scottish indie rock band formed in 2012 in Glasgow, Scotland. The band consisted of Johnny Madden (vocalist/guitarist), Connaire McCann (drummer) and Aidan McCann (bass) who share their name with a T. Rex track from the 1972 album The Slider. However, there are conflicting reports as front man Johnny Madden states in an interview with Guestlist says, "unlike people think we actually made the name up and it really stuck, and then we realised it was a T-Rex song."

The three-piece from north Glasgow were friends for years. "Creating Baby Strange was a great way to show off our creative side which we didn’t have the opportunity to do beforehand" says frontman Johnny Madden, as this band seems committed on bringing their contemporary punk to the nation. A unique feature of Baby Strange is that the recording, videoing and artwork of all work is done by the band members themselves.

== Biography ==
The band was formed in the summer of 2012, says frontman Johnny Madden. "We had no jobs, we were living for nothing. We were going out all the time, seeing the same faces, doing the same things. When we sing, "I’m tired of my generation", we mean that we’re part of this generation, and we were bored by ourselves." With the help of Connaire’s 17-year-old brother at the time, Aidan on bass, the trio began writing "fast, snappy, in-and-out punk-rock songs" in their bedrooms.

The band portrayed their different side in their clip on YouTube where they emerge topless and blinking, to mark the release of 'Pure Evil' on 27 May 2014. "California Sun" sees Baby Strange at their most confident in a pleas for sunshine by Johnny Madden's relentless, dark vocals.

2015 saw The Glasgow band release their single "Pleasure City". The song itself has featured on the newly formed internet radio station Beats 1, on Apple Music, received airplay on BBC Radio 1, and was also played at Scotland's national football stadium before the UEFA EURO Qualifiers Group stage match involving Scotland and Germany.

The band themselves have accompanied many other bands as a support, such as Kent based punk rock duo, Slaves. The band also went on tour with Jamie T, NME’s ‘best new band’ of 2013, Palma Violets. They have also toured with the likes of Swim Deep and Iceage.

In August 2013, they performed a short session for BBC Radio Scotland's Vic Galloway. They performed two songs, Friend and Pure Evil.

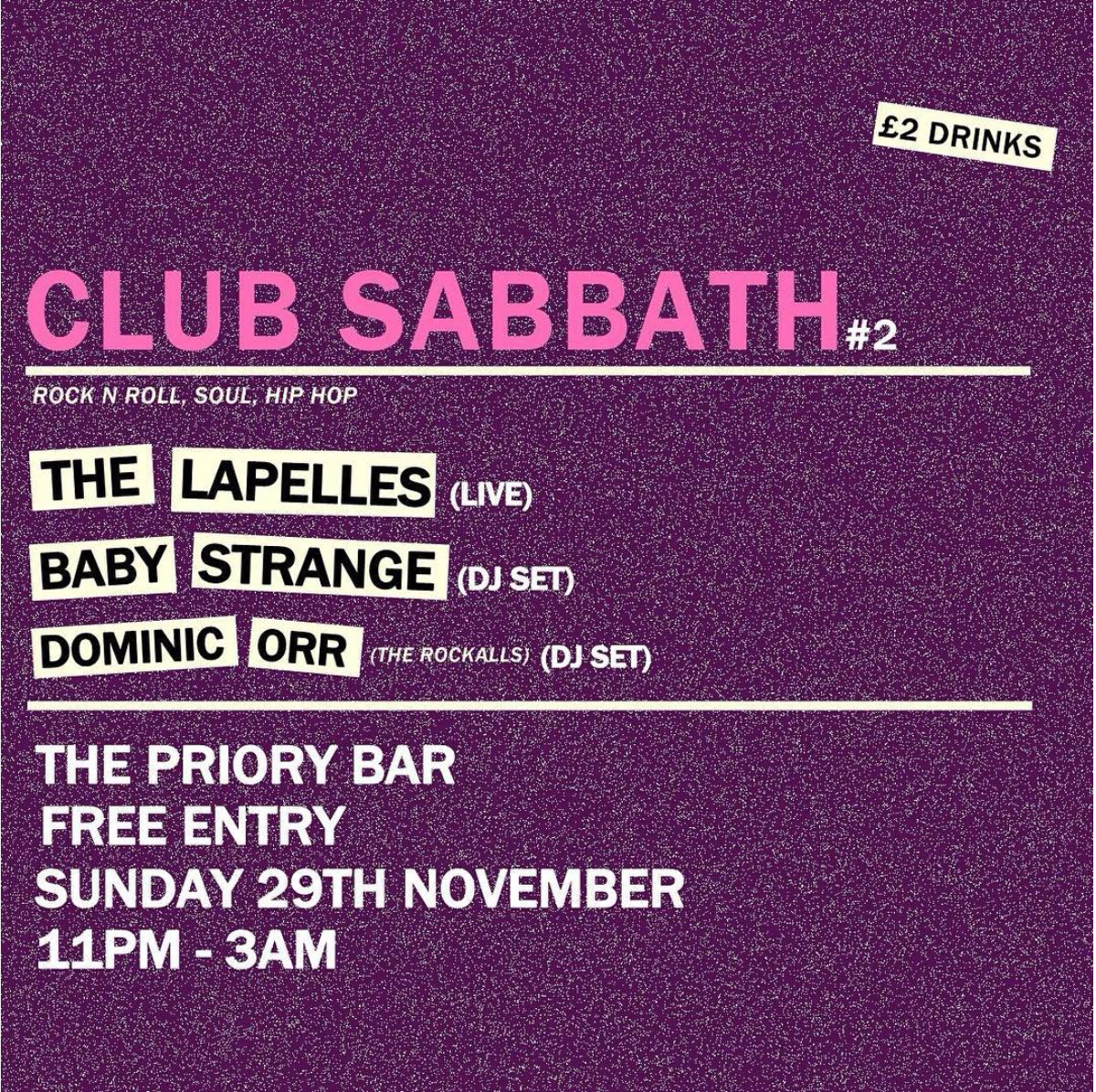
Baby Strange's club night in The Priory Bar

The band had a midnight residency in Glasgow bar "Broadcast" for around one month. The price of entry for these concerts was to simply buy a Baby Strange badge which cost £3. The trio recently however have started their own club night at The Priory.

Baby Strange played their biggest headline show to date on 16 December 2016 at O2 ABC in Glasgow.

Baby Strange has also played at the following festivals:

| Festival | Year |
|---|---|
| Gentlemen of the Road | 2015 |
| Underground Festival | 2015 |
| Wickerman Festival | 2015 |
| Stag & Dagger | 2014 |
| Reading and Leeds Festival | 2014 |
| Beacons Metro | 2014 |
| T in the Park | 2014 |
| BBC Radio 1's Big Weekend | 2014 |

== Musical style ==
The band's style is broadly described as pop-punk. The music has also been described as grungy rebel rock with some fun choruses that are reminiscent of those of the indie pop world. Baby Strange are regarded to have a darker indie rock sound, prominently heard on their 2015 singles "VVV" and "California Sun". At their live sets they are said to have, a 60s garage influence but distinctly Scottish indie guitar riffs.

== Album ==
The band released their album Want It Need it on 16 September 2016 on Ignition Records.

== Song usage ==
- The song "Friend" is played during series 7 episode 9 titled "You're Like A Fat Tom Daley" in Made in Chelsea.

Some of the songs of the band include:

| Song title | Year of release |
|---|---|
| "More! More! More!" | 2020 |
| "Pleasure City" | 2015 |
| "Trouble" | 2015 |
| "California Sun" | 2015 |
| "VVV" | 2015 |
| "Pure Evil" | 2013 |
| "Luver" | 2013 |
| "Distance Yourself" | 2014 |
| "Friend" | 2013 |
| "Never Enough" | 2013 |
