= The Soldier Thread =

- Origin: Austin, Texas, United States
- Genres: Indie pop, alternative rock
- Years active: 2007–2012
- Label: Launch787, Music Group LLC
- Members: Patricia Lynn; Todd Abels; Justin McHugh; Drew Vandiver; Chance Gilmore
- Website: www.thesoldierthread.com

The Soldier Thread was an indie pop band from Austin, Texas. Since its formation in late 2007, the quintet underwent an alteration in style from a true indie sound to more of a pop sound.

Songwriter, pianist and guitarist Justin McHugh with guitarist Todd Abels, recruited violist and singer Patricia Lynn, as well as drummer Drew Vandiver. Together, the band began recording tracks for their demo EP Fevers and Fireworks. After bassist Chance Gilmore joined, the band garnered enough attention from the EP and was given the opportunity to record their debut full-length album, Shapes.

Lynn had close ties to Justin Furstenfeld of Blue October, and was featured on the song "The Follow Through" from their 2011 album, Any Man in America. The Soldier Thread also opened for Blue October on their acoustic tour during the spring of 2011.

In June 2011, the band's song "Anybody", which featured Austin local rapper Zeale, was featured as a Staff Pick on KROX-FM (an Austin alternative rock radio station).

The Soldier Thread released their second album, In Spades, in 2010.

In November 2012, The Soldier Thread broke up. Lynn moved on to start a new band with Dwight Baker called The Wind and The Wave.

== Members ==
- Patricia Lynn - lead vocals, viola, keyboard
- Todd Abels - guitar, keyboard, backup vocals
- Justin McHugh - keyboard, guitar, backup vocals
- Drew Vandiver - drums
- Chance Gilmore - bass guitar

== Discography ==
- Fevers and Fireworks EP (2007)
- Shapes (2009)
- In Spades (2010)
- The Bull EP (2012)
