= Far from Saints (album) =

Studio album by Far from Saints
- Released: 16 June 2023
- Length: 43:36
- Label: Ignition
- Producer: Far from Saints

Kelly Jones chronology
Don't Let the Devil Take Another Day (2020)	Far from Saints (2023)

Far from Saints is the debut album by the trio Far from Saints, composed of Welsh singer-songwriter Kelly Jones and Patty Lynn and Dwight Baker of the American band the Wind and the Wave, who became friends with Jones after touring with his band Stereophonics in 2013. It was released on 16 June 2023 through Ignition Records.

== Background ==
After the Wind and the Wave had toured with Stereophonics in 2013, Jones reconnected with the duo in 2019, asking them to open for his solo tour. They struck up a musical partnership and decided to write and record an album together. Recording only took nine days, but the pandemic in 2020 delayed the release of the album.

== Critical reception ==
Professional ratings
Review scores
Source	Rating
American Songwriter	4/5 stars
The Scotsman	3/5 stars

Alli Patton of American Songwriter described the album as a "10-track meditation on life and love that comes alive in shades of country, rock, folk, soul, and Americana" and "a great introduction to a group of seasoned musicians starting anew, leading with an unadulterated love of the music that first brought them together". Fiona Shepherd of The Scotsman wrote that Far from Saints provides "ample opportunities for harmonies and Americana flavours" and the trio's debut album "plays out exactly as you might expect with a mix of country balladry, southern soul inflections, winsome vanilla pop, orchestral embellishments and the acoustic roots rock which best suits Jones's raspy voice".

== Track listing ==
Far from Saints track listing
No.	Title	Length
1.	"Screaming Hallelujah"	4:56
2.	"Faded Black Tattoo"	4:22
3.	"Take It Through the Night"	4:38
4.	"Let's Turn This Back Around"	5:28
5.	"Gonna Find What's Killing Me"	3:37
6.	"The Ride"	4:39
7.	"We Won't Get Out Alive"	3:32
8.	"No Fool Like an Old Fool"	4:14
9.	"Let the Light Shine Over You"	4:06
10.	"Own It"	4:04
Total length:		43:36

== Charts ==
Chart performance for Far from Saints
Chart (2023)	Peak position
Scottish Albums (OCC)	4
UK Albums (OCC)	5
UK Country Albums (OCC)	1
UK Independent Albums (OCC)	2
