= Sadnecessary =

Studio album by Milky Chance
- Released: 31 May 2013
- Recorded: 2012–2013
- Genre: Folktronica
- Length: 55:33
- Label: Lichtdicht
- Producer: Clemens Rehbein, Philipp Dausch (Milky Chance)

Milky Chance chronology
Sadnecessary (2013)	Blossom (2017)

Singles from Sadnecessary
- 1. "Stolen Dance" Released: 5 April 2013; 2. "Down by the River" Released: 28 March 2014; 3. "Flashed Junk Mind" Released: 29 August 2014

Sadnecessary is the debut studio album by German duo Milky Chance. It was released in Germany on 31 May 2013. The album includes the singles "Stolen Dance" and "Down by the River". The album peaked at number 14 in Germany, and charted at 17 on the Billboard 200 chart.

== Production and release ==
Sadnecessary is Milky Chance's debut studio album. The album was released in Germany on 31 May 2013. It was released in the United States a year later, on 14 October 2014.

=== Singles ===
- "Stolen Dance" was released as the lead single from the album on 5 April 2013. The song reached number one in Ireland, Austria, France, Belgium, Switzerland, Poland, Czech Republic, and Hungary.
- "Down by the River", a song from Sadnecessary, was re-released as a single on 28 March 2014 in Germany through Lichtdicht Records. The song charted in France, Germany, Switzerland and United Kingdom, and also appears in FIFA 15.

== Reception ==
Professional ratings
Review scores
Source	Rating
AllMusic	3.5/5 stars

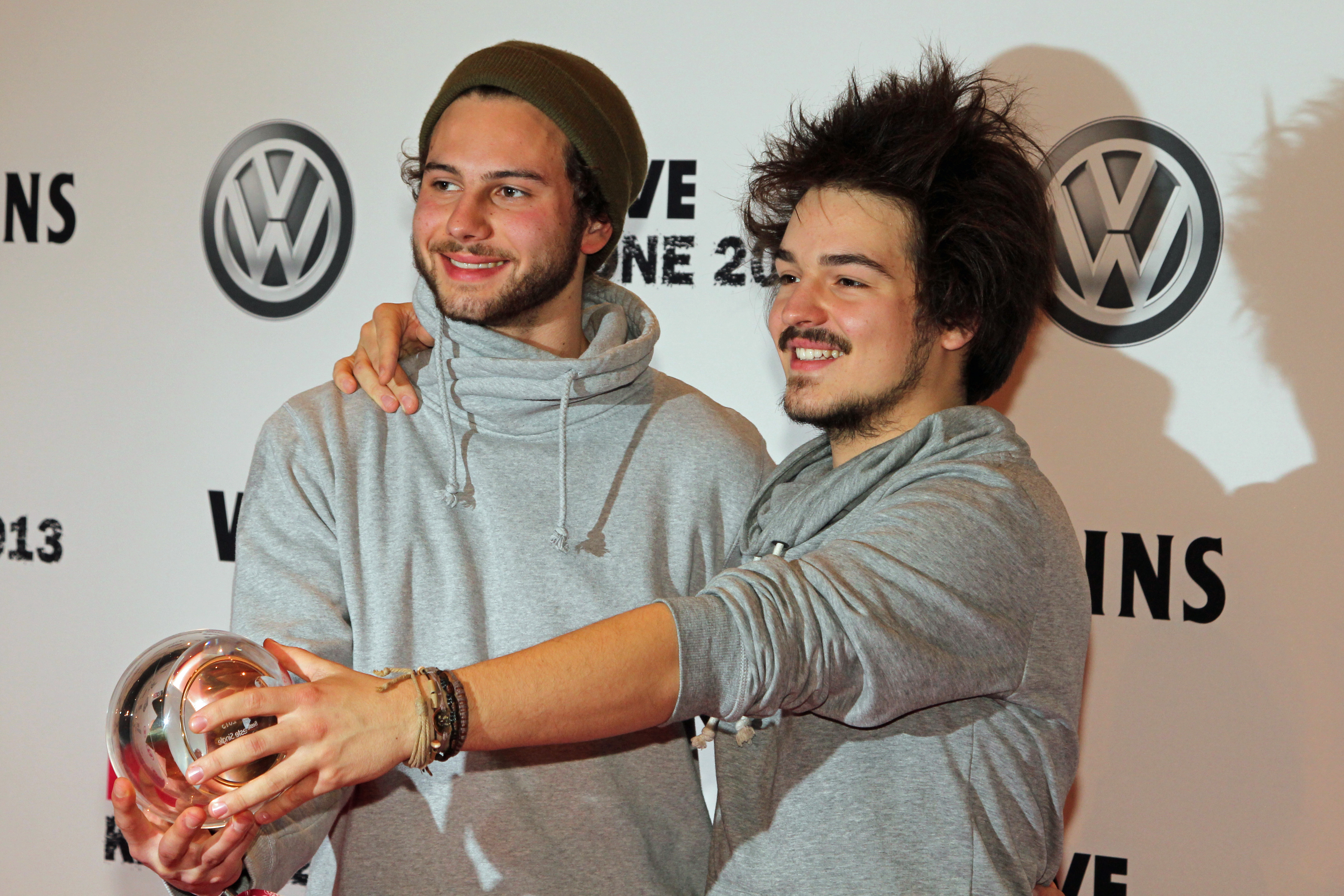
Dausch (left) and Rehbein (right) receiving the winning trophy at the 1Live Krone Radio Awards in Germany in 2013.

The album peaked at number 14 in Germany, and charted at 17 on the Billboard 200 chart. The group toured in support of the album, and on 5 December 2013, they won the 1Live Krone radio awards for the Best Single with "Stolen Dance".

It received largely positive press, and within a day of its release in 2014, Spin named Sadnecessary their Album of the Week. Spin further described the leading single "Stolen Dance" as a "serenely rollicking crossover jam", clarifying that the song "is no red herring — the great majority of Sadnecessary follows in its pattern of low-octane beats and gently lapping guitar strumming, making for a lovely and understated album." Remarking on Rehbein's "weathered" vocal style, Billboard said the band's "less-is-more aesthetic puts it front and center, where it will either enchant or annoy listeners."

== Awards ==
Awards for Sadnecessary
Year	Award	Nominated work	Category	Result
2013	1Live Krone	"Stolen Dance"	Best Single	Won
2015	European Border Breakers Award	Sadnecessary	Best Album	Won

== Track listing ==
All tracks are written by Clemens Rehbein

Standard edition
No.	Title	Length
1.	"Stunner"	4:50
2.	"Flashed Junk Mind"	4:24
3.	"Becoming"	2:26
4.	"Running"	4:30
5.	"Feathery" (Slow Version)	3:18
6.	"Indigo"	1:28
7.	"Sadnecessary"	5:00
8.	"Down by the River"	4:03
9.	"Sweet Sun"	4:36
10.	"Fairytale"	4:18
11.	"Stolen Dance"	5:15
12.	"Loveland" (Studio Version)	3:38
13.	"Feathery" (Bonus Track)	4:26
14.	"Loveland" (Bonus Track)	4:00
Total length:		56:12

Special edition
No.	Title	Length
1.	"Stunner"	4:50
2.	"Flashed Junk Mind"	4:24
3.	"Becoming"	2:26
4.	"Running"	4:30
5.	"Feathery"	3:18
6.	"Indigo"	1:28
7.	"Sadnecessary"	5:00
8.	"Down by the River"	4:03
9.	"Sweet Sun"	4:36
10.	"Fairytale"	4:18
11.	"Stolen Dance"	5:15
12.	"Loveland"	3:38
13.	"Sweet Sun" (Live)	4:59
14.	"Running" (Live)	4:49
15.	"Given" (Live)	5:09
16.	"Nevermind" (Live)	6:02
17.	"Follow" (Live)	6:07
18.	"Who to Blame" (Live)	6:41
Total length:		54:05

== Personnel ==
All credits for Sadnecessary are adapted from the album's liner notes.

Milky Chance

- Clemens Rehbein – production, mixing
- Philipp Dausch – production, mixing

Additional Personnel

- Mathias Jakob – mastering
- Andreas Stormer – mastering
- Moritz Buchmann – artwork
- Martin Rost – artwork
- Benne Weymann – artwork

== Charts ==
=== Weekly charts ===
Weekly chart performance for Sadnecessary
Chart (2013–2014)	Peak position
Australian Albums (ARIA)	8
Austrian Albums (Ö3 Austria)	23
Belgian Albums (Ultratop Flanders)	43
Belgian Albums (Ultratop Wallonia)	15
Canadian Albums (Billboard)	3
Czech Albums (ČNS IFPI)	49
Dutch Albums (Album Top 100)	51
French Albums (SNEP)	5
German Albums (Offizielle Top 100)	14
Irish Albums (IRMA)	90
Italian Albums (FIMI)	54
New Zealand Albums (RMNZ)	14
Norwegian Albums (VG-lista)	15
Scottish Albums (OCC)	33
Swedish Albums (Sverigetopplistan)	25
Swiss Albums (Schweizer Hitparade)	14
UK Albums (OCC)	36
UK Independent Albums (OCC)	6
US Billboard 200	17
US Top Alternative Albums (Billboard)	3
US Top Rock Albums (Billboard)	4

=== Year-end charts ===
2014 year-end chart performance for Sadnecessary
Chart (2014)	Position
Belgian Albums (Ultratop Flanders)	200
Belgian Albums (Ultratop Wallonia)	62
French Albums (SNEP)	96
Swiss Albums (Schweizer Hitparade)	30

2015 year-end chart performance for Sadnecessary
Chart (2015)	Position
US Billboard 200	180
US Top Rock Albums (Billboard)	60

== Certifications ==
Certifications for Sadnecessary
Region	Certification	Certified units/sales
Australia (ARIA)	Gold	35,000^{^}
Austria (IFPI Austria)	Gold	7,500^{*}
Canada (Music Canada)	2× Platinum	160,000^{‡}
Denmark (IFPI Danmark)	Gold	10,000^{‡}
France (SNEP)	Gold	50,000^{‡}
Germany (BVMI)	Gold	100,000^{^}
Italy (FIMI)	Gold	25,000^{‡}
New Zealand (RMNZ)	2× Platinum	30,000^{‡}
United Kingdom (BPI)	Silver	60,000^{‡}
United States (RIAA)	Gold	500,000^{‡}
^{*} Sales figures based on certification alone.^{^} Shipments figures based on certification alone.^{‡} Sales+streaming figures based on certification alone.

== Release history ==
Release history and formats for Sadnecessary
Region	Release date	Format	Label
Germany	31 May 2013	Digital download; CD	Lichtdicht
United States	14 October 2014	Digital download; CD	Lichtdicht
