= Stolen Dance =

Single by Milky Chance

from the album Sadnecessary
- Released: 5 April 2013
- Recorded: 2012
- Genre: Indie pop; folktronica; psychedelic folk
- Length: 5:13 (original mix); 3:23 (radio edit)
- Label: Lichtdicht; PIAS; Opaque; Republic; Neon; Ignition
- Songwriter: Clemens Rehbein
- Producers: Clemens Rehbein, Philipp Dausch

Milky Chance singles chronology
"Stolen Dance" (2013)	"Down by the River" (2014)

Music video
- "Stolen Dance" on YouTube

"Stolen Dance" is the debut single by German duo Milky Chance, released in 2012 in Germany. The single has reached number one in Austria, France, Belgium (Wallonia), Ireland, Switzerland, Poland, Czech Republic and Hungary, additionally it was the most popular track in Poland in 2014. A 4-track Stolen Dance EP (including the single "Down by the River") was released by Lichtdicht Records and Republic Records on 9 May 2014. The song also placed at number 4 in Triple J's Hottest 100, 2014.

== History ==
=== Single and music video ===
After playing two live shows, over two weeks in 2013, the band recorded their debut album in a home-made studio in Rehbein's childhood home. Before finishing and releasing the record, the group released several singles on SoundCloud and on YouTube. In an interview with Sonic 102.9, the band said that it took them three years to write the song "Stolen Dance". An early version of the song, with different production, was uploaded to YouTube on 7 September 2012. The final version of the song was first uploaded to YouTube 4 April 2013 and quickly became a viral hit, racking up millions of views. The magazine SPIN wrote about the video, "the clip for "Stolen Dance" nails the visual for its artist in a way that feels definitive and not overly self-conscious. It's still without being static, evocative while not provocative, silly but never stupid." The video made the band the "most blogged about act" for that month on HypeM. As of February 2025, the video has had over 900 million views on YouTube.

The song was first released on their own label on 5 April 2013 as a single and reached number one in Austria, France, Belgium (Wallonia), Switzerland, Poland, Czech Republic and Hungary.

=== 2014 EPs ===
With the success in Europe in 2013 and additional touring, the single was made available in a radio edit version and on two different versions of EP under various labels in 2014 in Luxembourg (where it also went to number one), Australia, U.S., Canada, New Zealand, and Ireland.

A 4-track Stolen Dance EP (including the single "Down by the River") was released by Lichtdicht Records and Republic Records on 9 May 2014.

The song charted in countries where it had not yet been released, such as the UK, which did not have a scheduled release date, although it was included on BBC Radio 1's "B List" the week of 23 June 2014. In the U.S., iTunes gave the song a release date of 17 June 2014, offering the "Stolen Dance" single (with the original mix) for free.

== Critical reception ==
Spin described the leading single "Stolen Dance" as a "serenely rollicking crossover jam", clarifying that the song "is no red herring — the great majority of Sadnecessary follows in its pattern of low-octane beats and gently lapping guitar strumming, making for a lovely and understated album."

== Awards and nominations ==
Year	Award	Nominated work	Category	Result
2014	European Border; Breakers Awards	Sadnecessary	Best Album	Won
2014	European Border; Breakers Awards	Milky Chance	Public Choice Award	Nominated

== Versions ==
=== 2013 ===
- "Stolen Dance" – 5:11/5:12 (original single release/original mix)
- "Stolen Dance" – 5:15 (album version; original mix on Sadnecessary)

=== 2014 ===
- "Stolen Dance" (radio edit) – 3:23 (featured on the Stolen Dance EP and Deep Sounds: The Very Best of Deep House
- "Stolen Dance" (Radio Edit FlicFlac Mix) – 3:35 (featured on the Stolen Dance EP, Club House 2014 – Holiday Summerhits and Essential Clubhouse – The Summer Collection 2014 (Mixed by Mark Bale))
- "Stolen Dance" (2014 Club Edit FlicFlac Mix) – 6:05 (featured on the Stolen Dance EP)
- "Stolen Dance" (New Club Edit FlicFlac) – 6:02 (featured on Deep House Hits, Vol. 1)

== Charts and certifications ==
=== Weekly charts ===
Weekly chart performance
Chart (2013–2024)	Peak position
Australia (ARIA)	2
Austria (Ö3 Austria Top 40)	1
Belgium (Ultratop 50 Flanders)	3
Belgium (Ultratop 50 Wallonia)	1
Canada Hot 100 (Billboard)	7
Canada AC (Billboard)	25
Canada CHR/Top 40 (Billboard)	33
Canada Hot AC (Billboard)	30
Canada Rock (Billboard)	7
Colombia (National-Report Top Rock)	3
Czech Republic Airplay (ČNS IFPI)	1
Czech Republic Singles Digital (ČNS IFPI)	6
Denmark (Tracklisten)	21
Euro Digital Song Sales (Billboard)	19
Finland (Suomen virallinen lista)	3
France (SNEP)	1
French Airplay (SNEP)	1
Germany (GfK)	2
Hungary (Rádiós Top 40)	31
Hungary (Single Top 40)	6
Ireland (IRMA)	1
Israel International Airplay (Media Forest)	8
Italy (FIMI)	6
Luxembourg Digital Songs (Billboard)	1
Netherlands (Dutch Top 40)	2
Netherlands (Single Top 100)	2
New Zealand (Recorded Music NZ)	3
Norway (VG-lista)	2
Poland Airplay (ZPAV)	1
Portugal Digital Songs (Billboard)	1
Russia Airplay (TopHit)	16
Scottish Singles Sales (Official Charts)	17
Slovakia Airplay (ČNS IFPI)	3
Slovakia Singles Digital (ČNS IFPI)	9
Slovenia (SloTop50)	1
Spain (Promusicae)	3
Sweden (Sverigetopplistan)	3
Switzerland (Schweizer Hitparade)	1
UK Singles (Official Charts)	24
UK Indie (Official Charts)	1
Ukraine Airplay (TopHit)	7
US Billboard Hot 100	39
US Adult Pop Airplay (Billboard)	10
US Hot Rock & Alternative Songs (Billboard)	4
US Latin Airplay (Billboard)	48
US Pop Airplay (Billboard)	31
US Rock & Alternative Airplay (Billboard)	1

=== Year-end charts ===
Annual chart rankings
Chart (2013)	Position
Austria (Ö3 Austria Top 40)	52
Germany (Media Control AG)	27
Switzerland (Schweizer Hitparade)	75

Chart (2014)	Position
Australia (ARIA)	15
Austria (Ö3 Austria Top 40)	41
Belgium (Ultratop Flanders)	13
Belgium (Ultratop Wallonia)	4
Canada (Canadian Hot 100)	36
France (SNEP)	5
Germany (Official German Charts)	47
Hungary (Single Top 40)	46
Israel (Media Forest)	8
Italy (FIMI)	18
Netherlands (Dutch Top 40)	4
Netherlands (Single Top 100)	9
New Zealand (Recorded Music NZ)	32
Poland (ZPAV)	1
Russia Airplay (TopHit)	149
Slovenia (SloTop50)	2
Spain (PROMUSICAE)	9
Sweden (Sverigetopplistan)	22
Switzerland (Schweizer Hitparade)	8
Ukraine Airplay (TopHit)	47
US Hot Rock Songs (Billboard)	16
US Rock Airplay (Billboard)	11

Chart (2015)	Position
France (SNEP)	111
US Hot Rock Songs (Billboard)	10
US Rock Airplay (Billboard)	3

Chart (2024)	Position
Hungary (Rádiós Top 40)	64

Chart (2025)	Position
Hungary (Rádiós Top 40)	69

=== Certifications ===
Certifications and sales
Region	Certification	Certified units/sales
Australia (ARIA)	4× Platinum	280,000^{^}
Austria (IFPI Austria)	2× Platinum	60,000^{*}
Belgium (BRMA)	Gold	15,000^{*}
Canada (Music Canada)	Diamond	800,000^{‡}
Denmark (IFPI Danmark)	2× Platinum	180,000^{‡}
France (SNEP)	Platinum	200,000^{‡}
Germany (BVMI)	Platinum	300,000^{^}
Italy (FIMI)	3× Platinum	90,000^{‡}
Netherlands (NVPI)	Platinum	20,000^{‡}
New Zealand (RMNZ)	7× Platinum	210,000^{‡}
Spain (Promusicae)	3× Platinum	180,000^{‡}
Sweden (GLF)	Platinum	40,000^{‡}
United Kingdom (BPI)	2× Platinum	1,200,000^{‡}
United States (RIAA)	5× Platinum	5,000,000^{‡}
Streaming
Spain (Promusicae)	Platinum	8,000,000^{†}
^{*} Sales figures based on certification alone.^{^} Shipments figures based on certification alone.^{‡} Sales+streaming figures based on certification alone.^{†} Streaming-only figures based on certification alone.

== Release history ==
Street dates
Region	Date	Format	Label
Various^{[A]}	5 April 2013	Digital download (original mix)	Lichtdicht
Germany	1 October 2013	Digital download (original mix)	Opaque
France	11 November 2013	Digital download (original mix)	Lichtdicht
Belgium	11 November 2013	Digital download (original mix)	Lichtdicht
Luxembourg	10 February 2014	Digital download (original mix and radio edit)	Lichtdicht
Australia	11 April 2014	Digital download (original mix and radio edit)	Lichtdicht
United States	9 May 2014	Digital download (original mix)	Republic
Canada	9 May 2014	Digital download (original mix)	Republic
United States	20 May 2014	Modern rock radio	Republic
New Zealand	20 June 2014	Digital download (original mix)	Neon
Ireland	27 June 2014	Digital download (original mix)	Ignition
United States	8 September 2014	Hot adult contemporary radio	Republic
United States	9 September 2014	Contemporary hit radio	Republic

== Notes ==
- A The single was first made available on iTunes in various countries with unrestricted access including Kenya, Zimbabwe, and South Africa.
