= Corinne Day =

British photographer (1962–2010)

- Born: 19 February 1962
- Died: 27 August 2010 (aged 48)
- Occupation: Fashion photographer
- Years active: 1989–2010
- Website: www.corinneday.com

Corinne Day (19 February 1962 – 27 August 2010) was a British fashion photographer, documentary photographer and fashion model.

== Early life ==
Corinne Day grew up in Ickenham with her younger brother and her grandparents. She left school aged sixteen and worked as an assistant in a local bank. After a year at the bank she became an international mail courier. It was during this period that someone suggested she try modelling—she worked consistently as a catalogue model for several years.

== Photography career ==
=== First steps in fashion photography ===
In 1985 she met Mark Szaszy on a train in Tokyo—Szaszy was a male model and had a keen interest in film and photography. During an extended trip to Hong Kong and Thailand, Szaszy taught Day how to use a camera and in 1987 they moved to Milan. It was in Milan that Day's career as a fashion photographer started. Having produced photographs of Szaszy and her friends for their modelling portfolios, Day began approaching magazines for work.

In 1989 Day had her first meeting with Phil Bicker, the art director of The Face. Through Bicker, Day met stylists Anna Cockburn and Melanie Ward, with whom she was to create some of her most iconic images. Day's photographs came to public attention through her fashion editorial for The Face titled, "The Third Summer of Love" published in July 1990. Commissioned by Bicker and styled by Ward, the story used Kate Moss as the model in an eight-page fashion story, showcasing garments by Romeo Gigli, Joseph Tricot, Ralph Lauren, and a feather head-dress from the now-defunct Covent Garden boutique World. Taken during a day trip to Camber Sands, a number of the photographs depicted the teenage Moss semi-nude and laughing on the beach. The photograph of Moss wearing the feather head-dress featured on the front cover of the magazine is now one of Day's most recognised images. Day had previously worked with Moss on the Levi's 'Levis for Girls' campaign with The Design Corporation.

=== 1990s ===
Day photographed Kate Moss for her first Vogue cover in 1993.

During the early 1990s Day continued to work with The Face, as well as a number of magazines associated with youth and counter culture, including, i-D, Ray Gun and Penthouse, working with models including Moss, Rosemary Ferguson and George Clements. In 1993, Day was commissioned by Alexandra Shulman to photograph Moss for the June issue of the British edition of Vogue. Intended as a lingerie fashion spread, the editorial, "Under Exposed" depicted the 19-year-old Moss in her west London flat, which she shared with her then boyfriend, fashion photographer Mario Sorrenti. The images caused a media scandal, with The Independent claiming that the images were hideous, exploitative, verging on child pornography.

=== Documentary work ===
Day retreated from fashion work in the wake of the heroin chic debate, instead choosing to tour America with the band Pusherman and concentrate on her documentary photography. She also undertook work photographing musicians, including the image of Moby, used on his 1999 album Play.

Her autobiographical book, Diary was published by Krus Verlag in 2000, and contained frank and at times shocking images of Day and her friends. The images in Diary featured young people hanging out, taking drugs and having sex, and have been compared to the documentary realism of Nan Goldin. Coinciding with the publication of Diary, Day had two large scale exhibitions in London in 2000. Gimpel Fils gallery exhibited portrait photographs depicting Day's friend Tara St. Hill, and The Photographers' Gallery showed selected works from Diary. In addition to these solo exhibitions, Day also participated in the exhibitions Imperfect Beauty at the Victoria and Albert Museum, London, curated by Charlotte Cotton in 2000; Chic Clicks at the Institute of Contemporary Art, Boston, curated by Ulrich Lehmann in 2002; Not in Fashion, Museum für Moderne Kunst MMK, Frankfurt, 2010.

During the 2000s Day returned to fashion photography, working for British, French and Italian Vogue, Arena and Vivienne Westwood, amongst others. During this time she also photographed film actors Nicolas Cage, Sienna Miller and Scarlett Johansson.

=== 2000s ===
In 2007, Day was invited to participate in the exhibition "The Face of Fashion", curated by Susan Bright at the National Portrait Gallery, London. The exhibition also included work by Day's contemporaries Mario Sorrenti and Mert Alas & Marcus Piggott. Images by Day in the exhibition included early photographs of Rosemary Ferguson from an editorial for L'Uomo Vogue, 1993; Kate Moss, for Vogue, 1993 and Georgina Cooper, for RayGun, 1994. For the exhibition, Day was commissioned by the National Portrait Gallery to create a new portrait of Kate Moss for its collection. Discussing the shoot, Day said, "I suggested to Kate that we have a conversation about a serious subject. The subject she chose to talk about revealed her true feelings and in turn defined her character."

On 7 August 2009, an article on models.com reported that Day had been diagnosed with a life-threatening brain tumor. A fundraising campaign titled Save the Day was organised to raise funds so that Day could receive Insulin Potentiation Therapy Low Dose or IPTLD chemotherapy in Arizona, USA. However, treatments were unsuccessful, and Day died on 27 August 2010.

== Legacy and influence ==
Writing in The Daily Telegraph, in late August 2010, Belinda White said, "Corinne opened the door for a whole generation of photographers, designers, models and stylists who suddenly saw that the fashion industry didn't have to be this exclusive club for the privileged and perfect."

An exhibition of Day's early photography for The Face was held at Gimpel Fils, London in September 2011.

== General references ==
- Gli scatti di Corinne Day e Kate Moss nella Londra rock anni ’90
