= Milky Chance =

German rock band

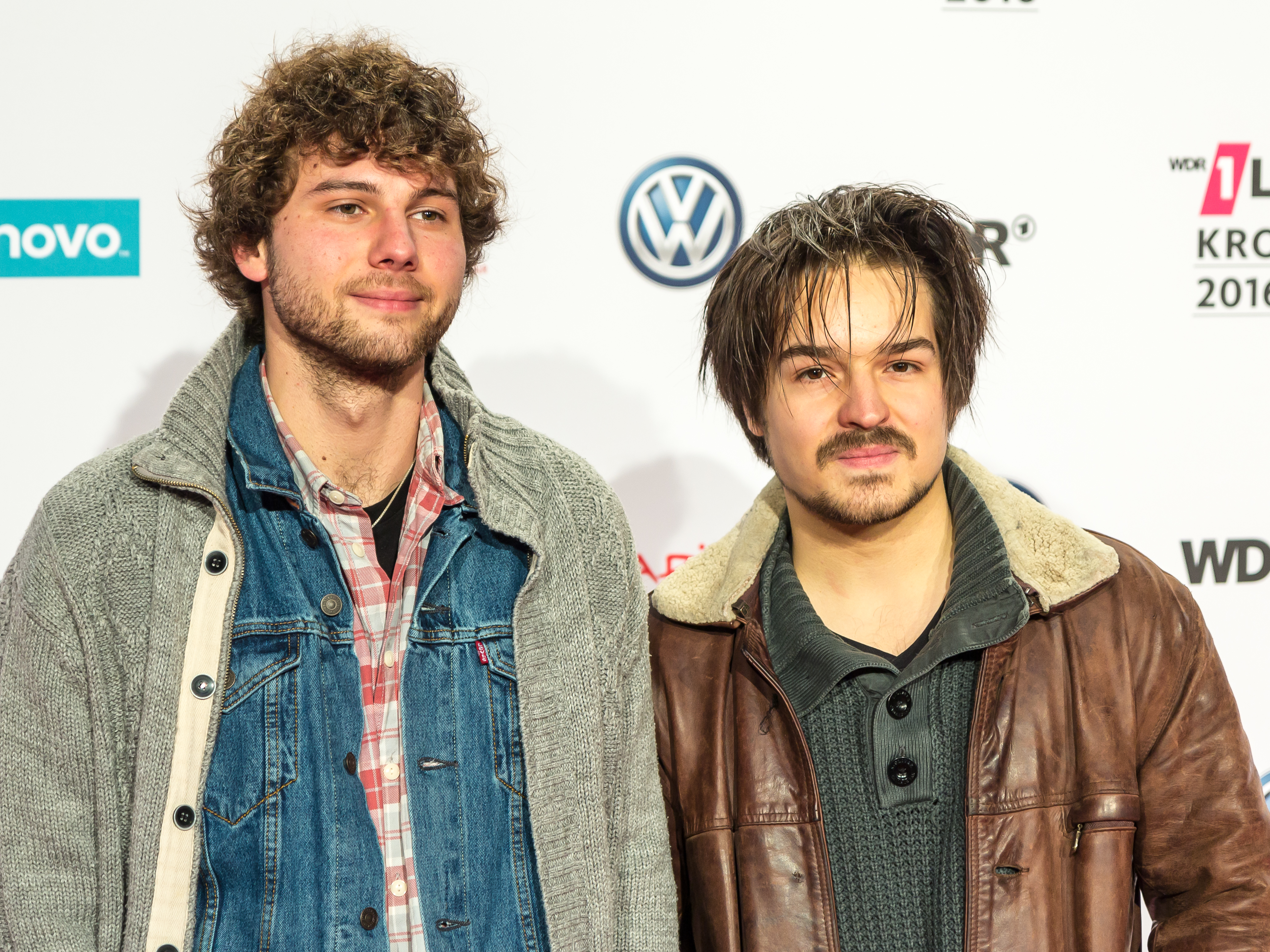
- Milky Chance in 2016: Dausch (left), Rehbein (right)

Background information
- Origin: Kassel, Hesse, Germany
- Genres: Alternative rock; electronic; reggae; folk; indie
- Works: Milky Chance discography
- Years active: 2012–present
- Labels: Muggelig; Lichtdicht; Ignition
- Members: Clemens Rehbein; Philipp Dausch; Antonio Greger; Sebastian Schmidt
- Website: milkychance.net

Milky Chance is a German rock band originating in Kassel. It consists of vocalist and guitarist Clemens Rehbein, bassist and percussionist Philipp Dausch, and their band members, Antonio Greger and Sebastian Schmidt.

Their first single, "Stolen Dance", was released in April 2013, topping the charts in several countries. It also won the 1Live Krone radio award for Best Single.

Their debut album, Sadnecessary, was released in October 2013 and included the single "Down by the River". The album peaked at number 14 in Germany, and in 2014, Spin named Sadnecessary their Album of the Week. The band made their TV debut on Jimmy Kimmel Live! in October 2014 and also won the European Border Breakers Award that month. They started a tour of North America in late 2014, performing at venues such as the House of Blues and festivals such as Coachella.

== History ==
=== 2012: Founding, first singles ===
After meeting in school, Clemens Rehbein and Philipp Dausch finished their secondary education at Jacob-Grimm-Schule in Kassel, Germany in 2012. Both were in a jazz quintet known as Flown Tones, where Rehbein played bass guitar and Dausch was a guitarist. The group disbanded after the drummer left, though Dausch and Rehbein continued to collaborate, feeling they had a good connection. They combined electronic production with acoustic guitar and their own vocals and lyrics. Rehbein wrote most of the songs at home, then uploaded them to YouTube, where they gradually gained a following.

External videos
- "Stolen Dance" Music Video (4 April 2013)
- "Flashed Junk Mind" Music Video (19 September 2014)
- "Milky Chance - Firebird" Music Video (2 February 2018)

After only playing two live shows over two weeks in 2013, the duo recorded their debut album in a simple home-made studio in Rehbein's childhood home. Before finishing and releasing the record, they released several singles on SoundCloud and on YouTube. In an interview with Edmonton's Sonic 102.9, the band said that it took them three years to write the song "Stolen Dance". It was first uploaded to YouTube on 4 April 2013 and they had low expectations for the track. However, it quickly became a viral hit, racking up millions of views. SPIN wrote about the video, "the clip for 'Stolen Dance' nails the visual for its artist in a way that feels definitive and not overly self-conscious. It's still without being static, evocative while not provocative, silly but never stupid." The video made the band the "most blogged about act" for that month on HypeM, and as of April 2025, the video holds over 900 million views on YouTube. The day after the video came out, the song "Stolen Dance" was first released (on their own label Lichtdicht Records) on 5 April 2013 as a single and reached number one in Germany, Austria, Luxembourg, Switzerland, and France. It also topped the charts in Belgium, Poland, Czech Republic, and Hungary. It reached number one on the Billboard Alternative chart. Their first big show was at a festival called Dockville in Hamburg, with about 5,000 people in attendance.

The band desired to "make it a little bit bigger" and reach international audiences. They performed at the Reeperbahn Festival in Hamburg, Germany, and a representative from Ignition liked what he saw. Their manager set up a meeting and they reached a distribution deal.

Milky Chance began a 100+ show tour, driving across Europe with allegedly simply "a guitar and a set of decks and some mpc."

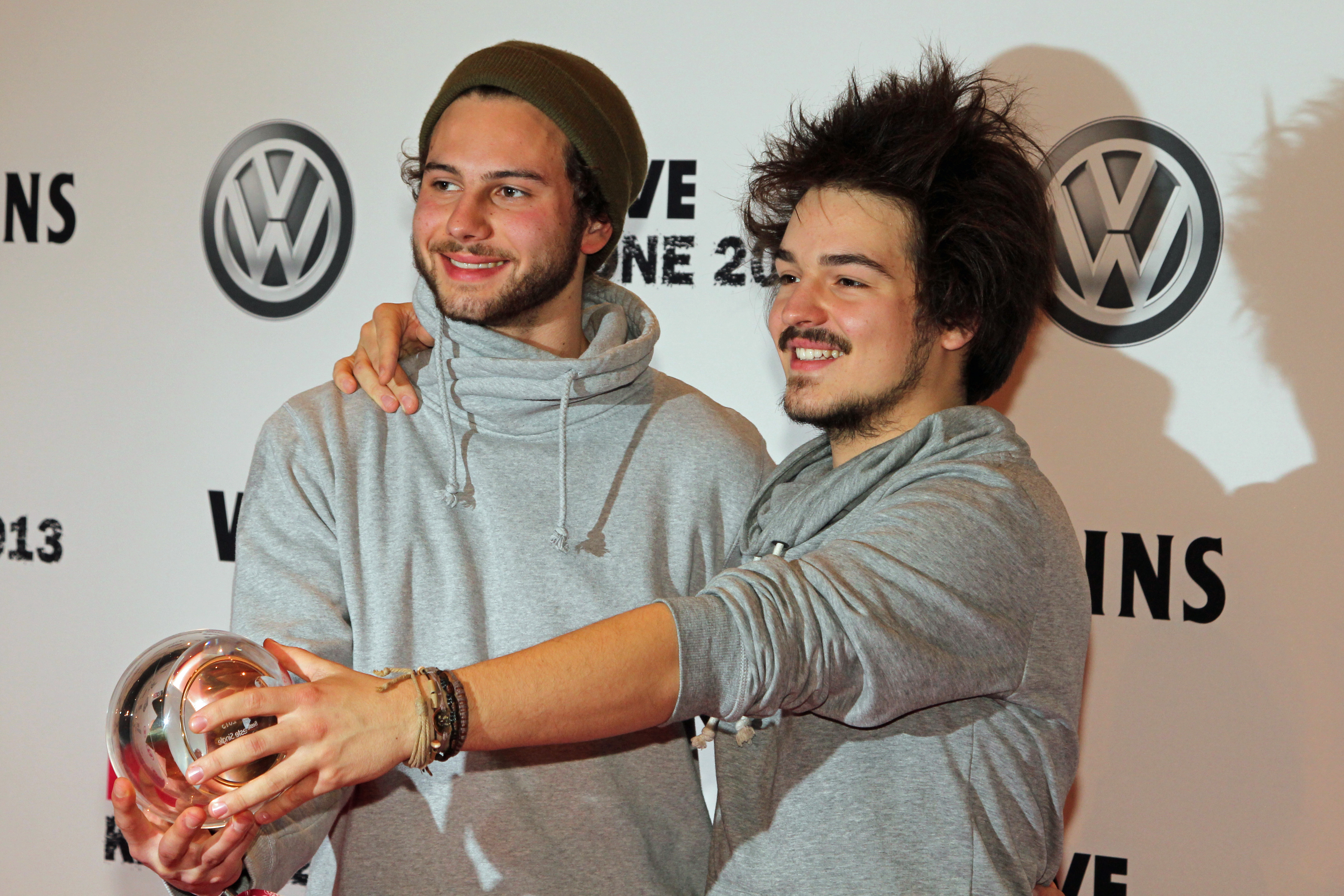
Dausch (left) and Rehbein (right) with the winning trophy at the 1Live Krone Radio Awards in Germany, 2013.

=== 2013–2016: Sadnecessary, world tour ===
Sadnecessary is the debut studio album by the group, released in Germany on 1 October 2013. The album includes the singles "Stolen Dance" and "Down by the River". It peaked at number 14 in Germany and charted at No. 17 on the Billboard 200 chart. Milky Chance toured in support of the record, and on 5 December 2013, they won the 1Live Krone radio awards for Best Single with "Stolen Dance."

"Down by the River" was re-released as a single on 28 March 2014 in Germany through Lichtdicht Records. It charted in France, Germany, Switzerland, and the United Kingdom, and appeared in the EA Sports game FIFA 15. After a successful tour, "Stolen Dance" was made available in a radio edit version and on two different versions of the Stolen Dance EP in 2014, in countries such as Luxembourg, Australia, the US, Canada, and New Zealand.

Sadnecessary was nominated for the IMPALA European Independent Album of the Year award.

Milky Chance played their first show in the United States in October 2014, in a sold-out performance at the Bowery Ballroom in New York City. Sadnecessary was released in the United States a year after its release in Germany, coming out on 14 October 2014. It received largely positive press from North American critics, and within a day of its release, SPIN named it their Album of the Week. SPIN further described the leading single "Stolen Dance" as a "serenely rollicking crossover jam," clarifying that the song "is no red herring — the great majority of Sadnecessary follows in its pattern of low-octane beats and gently lapping guitar strumming, making for a lovely and understated album."

The band made their TV debut on Jimmy Kimmel Live! on 22 October 2014, and that day they were nominated for Best Band at the German radio award show 1Live Krone. They also won the European Border Breakers Award that month, and on 16 September 2014, they were nominated as Best German Act at the MTV European Music Awards.^{[1]}

They toured the United States and Canada in late 2014. They were also guest artists on the Tonight Show with Jimmy Fallon, and they played the House of Blues in April 2015, with plans to return to Boston as part of their upcoming North American Summer Tour. Also in April, they played at the Coachella Valley Music and Arts Festival, with their album Sadnecessary at that point having been on the Billboard 200 for 23 weeks. "Stolen Dance" entered the Shazam Hall of Fame at No. 15 as one of the most "shazamed" songs of all time.

The band embarked on a tour that continued throughout 2015 and 2016. They visited more than 31 countries and performed more than 200 shows in North America, Europe, South Africa, and Oceania.

Milky Chance was nominated for Best Group and Best Newcomer at the Echo Awards in Germany.

=== 2017–2018: Blossom ===
Milky Chance released their second album, Blossom, on 17 March 2017. Blossom was inspired by the experience Clemens and Philipp had in the previous two years and the two different worlds they had jumped into: touring and being home in their private life with family and friends.

Blossom includes fourteen songs, along with "Bad Things", featuring Izzy Bizu. The first single to be released from the album was "Cocoon".

The band embarked on another world tour, visiting more than 26 countries and performing more than 161 shows by February 2018.

During their Blossom headline tour, they also played at the Osheaga Festival, Lollapalooza (Chicago and Paris), Austin City Limits, and Groovin' the Moo in Australia, as well as performing on Conan, all in 2017.

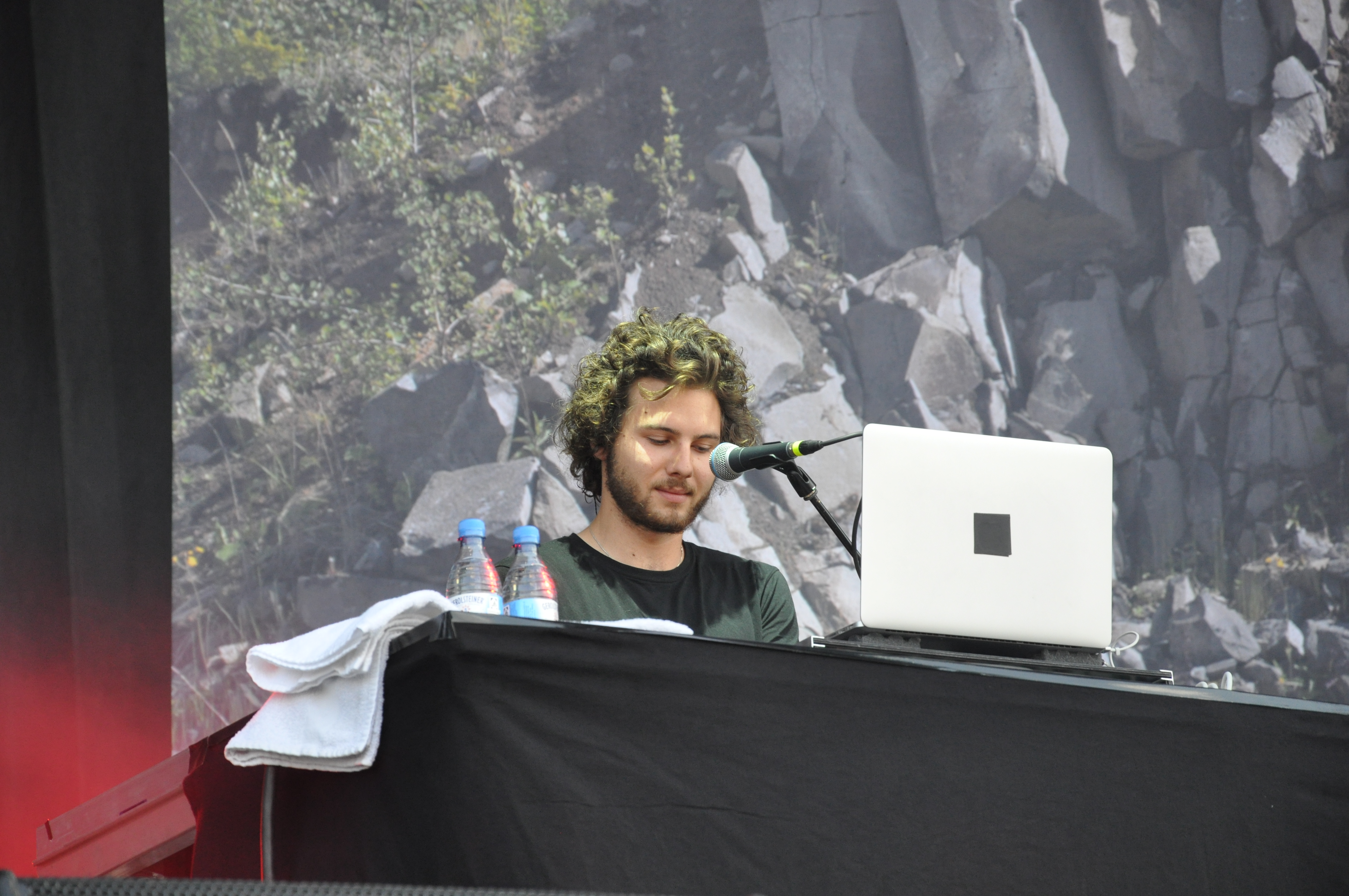
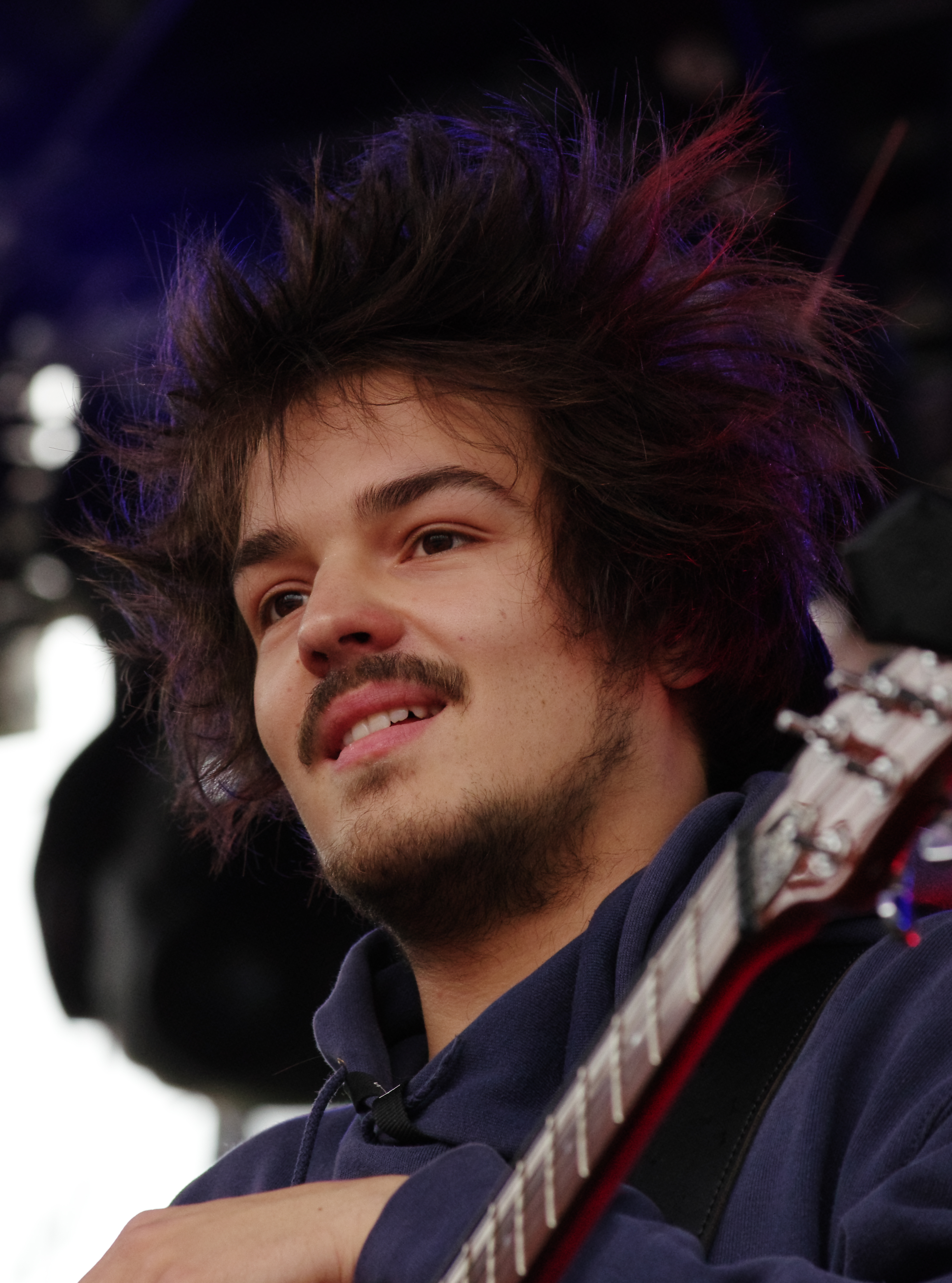
Philipp Dausch (left) handles electronics, while Clemens Rehbein (right) handles primary vocals and guitar

=== 2019–present: subsequent releases ===
In May 2019, Milky Chance announced that they were producing their third album, which would be titled Mind the Moon, recording it at Ocean Sound Recordings in Ålesund, Norway. Three songs from the album, "Daydreaming", "The Game", and "Fado", were issued in the months leading up to the album release, on 15 November 2019.

On 3 November 2021, the band published their fourth studio album, Trip Tape. On 20 April 2022, they issued an acoustic version of their debut album, Sadnecessary.

On 5 October 2022, Milky Chance released Trip Tape II.

On 9 June 2023, they issued their fourth album, Living in a Haze, which features guest appearances from Malian artist Fatoumata Diawara and Canadian singer Charlotte Cardin.

On 10 September 2025, Milky Chance released the compilation Trip Tape III, which includes the singles "Naked and Alive" and "Passion" as well as several covers and a live version of "Naked and Alive".

== Style and equipment ==
"[We both] hear things very much the same, it's like having the same ears. We totally understand the way we're sounding from each other and have the same vision for our music."

— Philipp Dausch in 2014

Milky Chance incorporates elements of folk, reggae, and jazz into their music. USA Today describes the band as "singer-songwriter with electronic beats." The music publication Noisey wrote, "The pair masterfully combines house and electronic beats with reggae and R&B influences; the lyrics, though, could have been written by a folk singer." The band has cited diverse artists as influences, including reggae and rock artists such as Bob Marley, Ray Charles, and John Frusciante of Red Hot Chili Peppers.

They use a relatively simple equipment setup in the studio, and their debut releases were recorded with only a MacBook Pro, a guitar, a microphone, and Logic Pro. Clemens Rehbein uses different guitars, including the Framus Mayfield Custom Electric.

As their career has progressed, Milky Chance have included Antonio Greger and Sebastian Schmidt as touring members.

Their second album, Blossom, was recorded close to their hometown, in Rotenburg an der Fulda. This time the duo relied on real instruments instead of a digital setup, and produced it together with Tobias Kuhn.

== Band members ==
Current

- Clemens Rehbein (2012–present) – lead vocals, guitar, bass
- Philipp Dausch (2012–present) – drums, percussion, vocals, guitar, bass

Touring musicians

- Sebastian Schmidt (2016–present) – drums, percussion
- Antonio Greger (2015–present) – guitar, harmonica, bass

== Awards and nominations ==
| Year | Award | Nominated work | Category | Result |
|---|---|---|---|---|
| 2013 | 1Live Krone | "Stolen Dance" | Best Single | Won |
| 2014 | 1Live Krone | Milky Chance | Best Band | Nominated |
| 2014 | MTV European Music Awards | Milky Chance | Best German Act | Nominated |
| 2014 | Los Premios 40 Principales | Milky Chance | Best International New Act | Nominated |
| 2015 | European Border Breakers Awards | Sadnecessary | Best Album | Won |
| 2015 | European Border Breakers Awards | Milky Chance | Public Choice Award | Nominated |
| 2018 | 1Live Krone | Milky Chance | Best Band | Nominated |
| 2018 | Echo Music Prize | Milky Chance | Best National Pop Group | Won |

== Discography ==
- Sadnecessary (2013)
- Blossom (2017)
- Mind the Moon (2019)
- Living in a Haze (2023)
