= Pusherman =

English alternative rock band

- Origin: Portsmouth, England
- Genres: Alternative rock
- Years active: 1994–1997
- Labels: Ignition Records
- Past members: Andy Frank; Meredith "Yank" Reid; Bo Ellery; Jon Bond Head; Martin Hoyland; Roger Swift; Tony Antoniou; Harry Harrison

Pusherman was an alternative rock band from Portsmouth, England. Formed in 1994, the band's lineup consisted of Andy Frank (vocals), Meredith "Yank" Reid (vocals, harmonica), Bo Ellery (bass), Martin Hoyland (guitar), Roger Swift (dorest wash board), Tony Antoniou (guitar) and Harry Harrison (drums).

Pusherman were signed to Oasis manager Marcus Russell's Ignition Records label, who released their first single entitled "First Time" in November 1995. Another single, "Whole", a 12" vinyl single, was voted single of the week by the NME, and though it was not available as a commercial release, it appeared on the NME 1996 cassette compilation Here Comes the Summer..., and Volume magazine's Volume Sixteen: Copulation Explosion! compilation.

The group's debut album, the Owen Morris–produced Floored, was released in September 1996. In November of that year, the song "Sold" from the album appeared on the CMJ New Music Monthly compilation, while another single "The Aim Indeed" was included in the UK indie compilation Indie Top 20 Volume 23.

Partly due to its members' heroin use, Pusherman disbanded in 1997. At the time of their breakup, they were being filmed by British filmmaker and music video director Mark Szaszy and photographer Corinne Day for a planned rockumentary". Afterwards singer Andy Frank moved to Los Angeles to form the band Jact along with Ted Hutt. Pusherman's other singer, Yank Reid, died in 2000. Bass player Bo Ellery played on It's Jo and Danny's 2005 album Lank Haired Girl to Bearded Boy. Guitarist Martin Hoyland is a member of 9Bach.

Andy Frank died in 2008 at his home in Los Angeles, aged 42, and was buried in Portsmouth, England.

== Discography ==
Title
"First Time" (single, 12" vinyl)
- Released: 27 November 1995
- Label: Ignition Records
"Whole" (12" vinyl)
- Released: 1996
- Label: Ignition Records
"Show Me Slowly" (single, 12" vinyl)
- Released: 18 March 1996
- Label: Ignition Records
"Chase It" (CD single, 7" vinyl, 12" vinyl)
- Released: 13 May 1996
- Label: Ignition Records
"The Aim Indeed" (CD single, 7" vinyl)
- Released: 2 September 1996
- Label: Ignition Records
Floored (LP Album, CD Album)
- Released: 23 September 1996
- Label: Ignition Records/Sony
- Singles: "Chase It", "Sold", "The Aim Indeed"
"Sold" (2 Part CD single, 7" vinyl)
- Released: 27 January 1997
- Label: Ignition Records
