= Flashed Junk Mind =

Single by Milky Chance

from the album Sadnecessary
- Released: 29 August 2014
- Recorded: 2012/13
- Genre: Folktronica
- Length: 3:59
- Label: Lichtdicht
- Songwriter(s): Milky Chance
- Producer(s): Milky Chance

Milky Chance singles chronology
"Down By the River" (2014)	"Flashed Junk Mind" (2014)	"Cocoon" (2016)

"Flashed Junk Mind" is a song performed by German duo Milky Chance. It was released as a digital download on 29 August 2014 through Lichtdicht as the third and final single from their debut studio album Sadnecessary (2013). The song was written and produced by Milky Chance.

== Music video ==
A music video to accompany the release of "Flashed Junk Mind" was first released onto YouTube on 19 September 2014 at a total length of three minutes and fifty-eight seconds.

== Track listing ==
Digital download
No.	Title	Length
1.	"Flashed Junk Mind"	4:24

== Charts ==
=== Weekly charts ===
Chart (2014–15)	Peak position
Australia (ARIA)	51
Belgium (Ultratip Bubbling Under Flanders)	25
Belgium (Ultratip Bubbling Under Wallonia)	26
Germany (GfK)	73
Hungary (Rádiós Top 40)	12
Hungary (Single Top 40)	31
US Hot Rock & Alternative Songs (Billboard)	38

=== Year-end charts ===
Chart (2015)	Position
Hungary (Rádiós Top 40)	78
US Hot Rock Songs (Billboard)	78

== Certifications ==
Region	Certification	Certified units/sales
Australia (ARIA)	Gold	35,000^{^}
Austria (IFPI Austria)	Gold	15,000^{*}
Canada (Music Canada)	Platinum	80,000^{‡}
New Zealand (RMNZ)	Platinum	30,000^{‡}
United Kingdom (BPI)	Silver	200,000^{‡}
United States (RIAA)	Gold	500,000^{‡}
^{*} Sales figures based on certification alone.^{^} Shipments figures based on certification alone.^{‡} Sales+streaming figures based on certification alone.

== Release history ==
Region	Date	Format	Label
Germany	29 August 2014	Digital download	Lichtdicht
