= I Wanna Get Lost with You =

Single by Stereophonics

from the album Keep the Village Alive
- Released: 21 July 2015
- Genre: Rock
- Length: 3:50
- Label: Stylus
- Songwriter: Kelly Jones
- Producers: Kelly Jones; Jim Lowe

Stereophonics singles chronology
"C'est la Vie" (2015)	"I Wanna Get Lost with You" (2015)	"Song for the Summer" (2015)

Music video
- "I Wanna Get Lost with You" on YouTube

"I Wanna Get Lost with You" is a song by Welsh rock band Stereophonics. It is the second single, released on 21 July 2015, from their ninth studio album Keep the Village Alive. Lead-singer and guitarist Kelly Jones stated the track is about "wanting to lose yourself personally, and lose yourself with somebody, and then just literally get out there." UK based webzine Gigwise released a trailer on their site for an exclusive showing of the music video on 20 July.

The song was first played live on the opening night of the Teenage Cancer Trust 2015 concert and it had its radio debut via The Ken Bruce Show on BBC Radio 2 on 20 July.

== Music video ==
The music video for "I Wanna Get Lost With You" aired on 20 July 2015 and was directed by Kelly Jones. It stars Aneurin Barnard (who was previously in the "C'est la Vie" video) along with Sophie Kennedy Clark who play unnamed characters. The opening shots are the band playing their instruments in a room filled with coloured christmas lights. By the time Jones starts singing, the first shot of Barnard is shown with him pouring shots in a bar, with the same lights shown in the background. Soon after, Kennedy Clark has arrived and is offered a shot from Barnard. After the first chorus both characters have left the bar and are shown hanging out in different scenarios: walking together in the rain, Barnard playing guitar and both of them kissing. During the song's bridge, the characters are under a bridge arguing and eventually Kennedy Clark walks away; Barnard runs after her and after talking with one another both of them make-up. The remaining shots are again both the characters hanging out kissing, riding a bike, running down a street, Kennedy Clark now playing guitar and lying in grass.

== Track listing ==
All tracks are written by Kelly Jones.

Digital download
No.	Title	Length
1.	"I Wanna Get Lost With You"	3:50

== Personnel ==
Stereophonics

- Kelly Jones – lead vocals, guitar
- Richard Jones – bass guitar
- Adam Zindani – guitar, backing vocals
- Jamie Morrison – drums

Technical

- Production – Kelly Jones, Jim Lowe

== Charts ==
Chart (2015)	Peak position
Scotland (Scottish Singles Chart)	25
UK Singles (Official Charts)	78
UK Downloads (OCC)	44
UK Single Sales (OCC)	44
UK Independent Singles (OCC)	7

== Certifications ==
Region	Certification	Certified units/sales
United Kingdom (BPI)	Gold	400,000^{‡}
^{‡} Sales+streaming figures based on certification alone.
