= Palace (album) =

Studio album by Chapel Club
- Released: 31 January 2011
- Genre: Indie Rock, Post-punk, Shoegaze
- Label: Polydor Records
- Producer: Paul Epworth

Chapel Club chronology
Palace (2011)	Good Together (2013)

Palace is the debut album by London-based band Chapel Club, which was released on 31 January 2011 by Polydor Records. The album featured production by Paul Epworth.

== Reception ==
Professional ratings
Aggregate scores
Source	Rating
Metacritic	68/100
Review scores
Source	Rating
Drowned in Sound	7/10
NME	6/10

Upon its release, Palace received some critical acclaim. At Metacritic, which assigns a weighted average score out of 100 to reviews and ratings from mainstream critics, the album has received a score of 68, based on 11 reviews, indicating "generally favorable reviews".

== Track listing ==
No.	Title	Length
1.	"Depths"	1:46
2.	"Surfacing"	3:42
3.	"Five Trees"	3:51
4.	"After the Flood"	3:39
5.	"White Knight Position"	3:08
6.	"The Shore"	6:03
7.	"Blind"	4:16
8.	"Fine Light"	5:14
9.	"O Maybe I"	3:30
10.	"All the Eastern Girls"	4:36
11.	"Paper Thin"	4:44

== Personnel ==
- Lewis Bowman – vocals
- Michael Hibbert and Alex Parry – guitar
- Liam Arklie – bass guitar
- Rich Mitchell – drums
