= The Wind and the Wave =

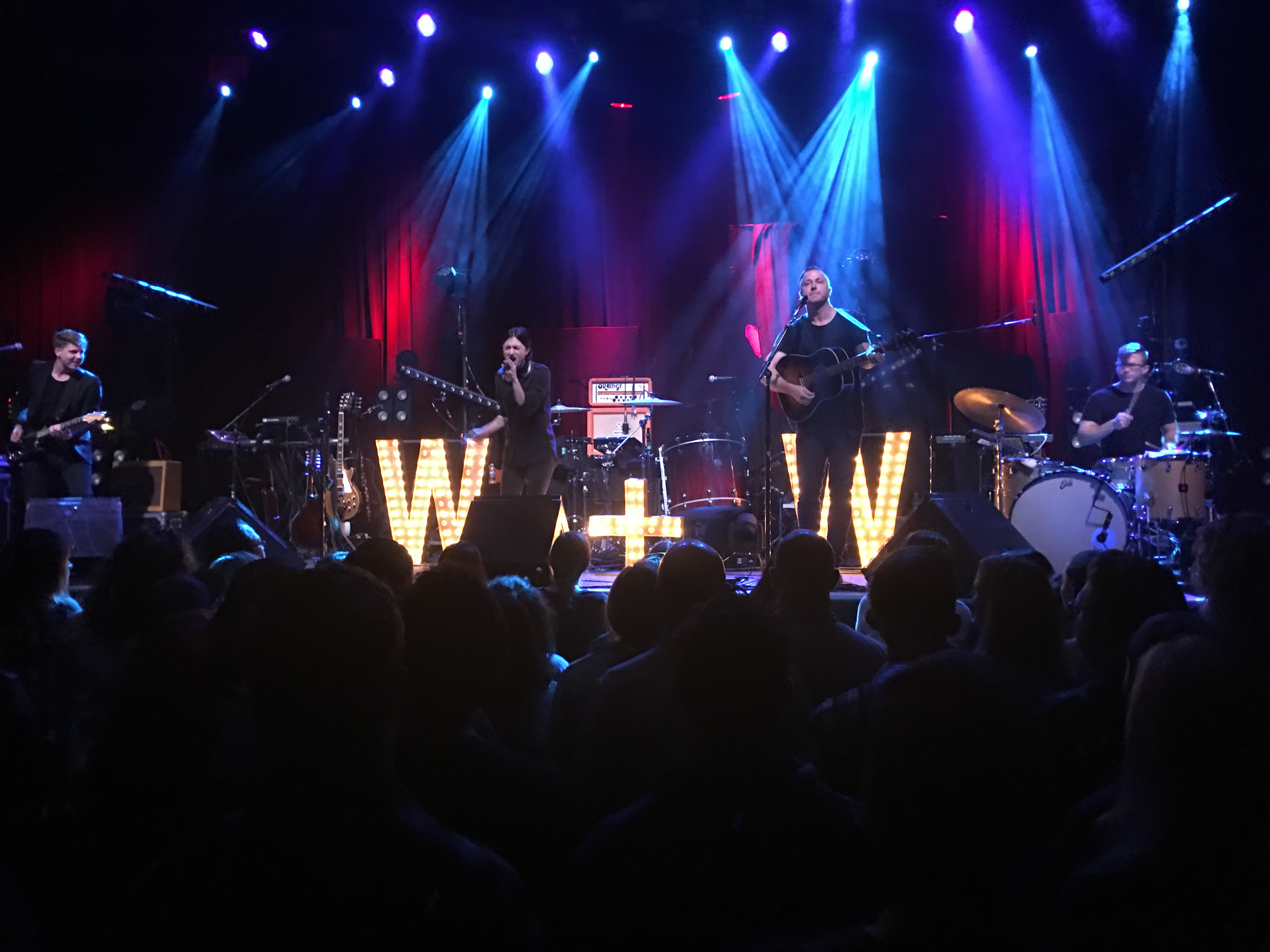
- The Wind + the Wave at the Fillmore, San Francisco, California, October 28, 2016

Background information
- Years active: 2013–present
- Label: Island
- Members: Patricia Lynn; Dwight Baker
- Website: www.thewindandthewave.com

The Wind and the Wave (stylized as The Wind + the Wave) is an American band composed of Dwight A. Baker and Patricia Lynn.

== Background ==
Dwight Baker and Patricia Lynn played their first show on July 4, 2013, in Austin, Texas, opening for Bob Schneider.

Previously, Lynn had been the lead singer of The Soldier Thread and Baker worked both in front of the microphone as well as in the recording studio for Alpha Rev, Brandi Carlile, Blue October, and Bob Schneider. In addition, Baker has also written music for Kelly Clarkson, and is the owner/operator of Matchbox Studios in Austin.

Signed to RCA Records in 2013, their debut album, From the Wreckage, was released on August 5, 2014.

The band's cover of "Chasing Cars" by Snow Patrol was featured on the episode, "She's Leaving Home", in season eleven of Grey's Anatomy. The placement propelled the cover song to the number one spot on Shazam's USA future hits chart.

The band has also had other limited success on television, having various songs featured on Nashville (season 4), Hart of Dixie, and The Vampire Diaries.

The band signed with Island Records in March 2016 and released their first single, "Grand Canyon", from their second album, Happiness is Not a Place on May 13, 2016. The band premiered their official music video for "Grand Canyon" on American Songwriter on June 24, 2016.

On October 28, 2016, the band released their first album under Island Records titled Happiness is Not a Place. The album was produced by Butch Walker and features a more raw, less polished sound than the band's freshman album.

The band's third album Human Beings Let You Down was released in October 2018, and the band supported the album with a national tour. On March 6, 2020, the band was the opening act for Stereophonics at London's O_{2} Arena.

== Discography ==
=== Albums ===
- From the Wreckage (2014)
- Covers One (2015)
- Happiness Is Not a Place (2016)
- Happiness Is Not a Place (Acoustic) (2017)
- Human Beings Let You Down (2018)
- Live in the UK (2020)
- Racing Hearts (2022)
- Far from Saints (2023) – as the trio Far from Saints, with Kelly Jones
