= Down by the River (Milky Chance song) =

Single by Milky Chance

from the album Sadnecessary
- Released: 28 March 2014
- Recorded: 2013
- Genre: Folktronica
- Length: 4:03
- Label: Lichtdicht
- Songwriters: Clemens Rehbein; Philipp Dausch
- Producer: Milky Chance

Milky Chance singles chronology
"Stolen Dance" (2013)	"Down by the River" (2014)	"Flashed Junk Mind" (2014)

Music video
- "Down by the River" on YouTube

"Down by the River" is a song by German folk duo Milky Chance. It was released as the second single from their debut studio album, Sadnecessary, on 28 March 2014 through Lichtdicht Records. The song has charted in France, Germany, Switzerland, and the United Kingdom. The song was written and produced by the duo themselves. The song also appears on the soundtrack for the association football video game published by EA Sports, FIFA 15.

== Meaning ==
The meaning behind the song, as explained by Clemens in a track by track commentary, is literally about a river; the Fulda, to be exact. The song was written based on a "Experiences I (Clemens) had down by the river." He does not like to explain the story behind it because when he's writing a song, he prefers to "draw a picture" of it, so that everybody can make their own story for it.

== Track listing ==
Digital download – EP
No.	Title	Length
1.	"Down by the River" (Radio Edit)	3:42
2.	"Down by the River"	4:03
3.	"Down by the River" (FlicFlac Radio Edit)	3:53
4.	"Down by the River" (FlicFlac Club Mix)	5:11

== Chart performance ==
=== Weekly charts ===
Chart (2014)	Peak position
France (SNEP)	64
Germany (GfK)	39
Switzerland (Schweizer Hitparade)	72
UK Singles (OCC)	79

== Certifications ==
Region	Certification	Certified units/sales
Canada (Music Canada)	Platinum	80,000^{‡}
New Zealand (RMNZ)	Platinum	30,000^{‡}
United Kingdom (BPI)	Silver	200,000^{‡}
United States (RIAA)	Gold	500,000^{‡}
^{‡} Sales+streaming figures based on certification alone.

== Release history ==
Region	Date	Format	Label
Germany	28 March 2014	Digital download	Lichtdicht
