= Blossom (Milky Chance album) =

Studio album by Milky Chance
- Released: 17 March 2017
- Length: 60:11
- Label: Muggelig; Ignition
- Producer: Milky Chance

Milky Chance chronology
Sadnecessary (2013)	Blossom (2017)	Mind the Moon (2019)

Singles from Blossom
- 1. "Cocoon" Released: 11 November 2016

Blossom is the second studio album by German folk group Milky Chance. It was released worldwide on 17 March 2017 and is the first album with guitarist Antonio Greger. The album is supported by the lead single "Cocoon".

== Track listing ==
Standard edition
No.	Title	Length
1.	"Blossom"	4:12
2.	"Ego"	3:52
3.	"Firebird"	3:41
4.	"Doing Good"	4:10
5.	"Clouds"	4:17
6.	"Cold Blue Rain"	4:57
7.	"Stay"	4:10
8.	"Bad Things" (featuring Izzy Bizu)	4:12
9.	"Cocoon"	4:15
10.	"Losing You"	4:32
11.	"Peripeteia"	3:43
12.	"Alive"	4:10
13.	"Piano Song"	3:18
14.	"Heartless"	6:42
Total length:		60:11

Deluxe edition bonus tracks
No.	Title	Length
15.	"Cold Blue Rain" (acoustic version)	3:45
16.	"Alive" (acoustic version)	3:16
17.	"Cocoon" (acoustic version)	3:14
18.	"Ego" (acoustic version)	4:28
19.	"Firebird" (acoustic version)	3:12
20.	"Peripeteia" (acoustic version)	3:18
Total length:		81:24

== Charts ==
Professional ratings
Review scores
Source	Rating
AllMusic	4/5 stars

Chart performance for Blossom
Chart (2017)	Peak position
Australian Albums (ARIA)	8
Austrian Albums (Ö3 Austria)	12
Belgian Albums (Ultratop Flanders)	81
Belgian Albums (Ultratop Wallonia)	67
Canadian Albums (Billboard)	7
Dutch Albums (Album Top 100)	40
French Albums (SNEP)	77
German Albums (Offizielle Top 100)	5
New Zealand Albums (RMNZ)	29
Swiss Albums (Schweizer Hitparade)	8
UK Album Downloads (OCC)	64
UK Independent Albums (OCC)	22
US Billboard 200	64
US Top Alternative Albums (Billboard)	7
US Top Rock Albums (Billboard)	10

== Certifications ==
Certifications for Blossom
Region	Certification	Certified units/sales
New Zealand (RMNZ)	Gold	7,500^{‡}
^{‡} Sales+streaming figures based on certification alone.
