= Modern Times (Latin Quarter album) =

Studio album by Latin Quarter
- Released: 1985
- Length: 42:26
- Label: Arista
- Producers: Pete Hammond; Latin Quarter; Nigel Gray

Latin Quarter chronology
Modern Times (1985)	Mick and Caroline (1987)

Professional ratings
Review scores
Source	Rating
AllMusic	3/5 stars

Modern Times is the first album by the British band Latin Quarter. It reached the top 20 in Germany and Sweden and spent two weeks on the UK Albums Chart, peaking at Number 91. It includes the songs "Radio Africa" which reached Number 19 in the UK Singles Chart. and "America for Beginners" which was covered by Toyah on her album Minx.

== Political themes ==
Latin Quarter's lyricist Mike Jones describes the album as "a veritable manifesto" of their left wing views as members of Big Flame. The title track takes its name from the Charlie Chaplin film as it critiques the effect of McCarthyism on Hollywood; "Radio Africa" describes the effect of Imperialism on that continent; "Toulouse" is about racism in France; "No Rope As Long As Time" is a plaintive account of Apartheid South Africa and "America for Beginners" describes the rise of the right wing in the United States. Toyah Willcox covered "America for Beginners" on her 1985 album Minx.

== Track listing ==
All tracks are written by Steve Skaith and Mike Jones, except where noted.

No.	Title	Writer(s)	Length
1.	"Modern Times"		3:45
2.	"No Ordinary Return"		3:35
3.	"Radio Africa"	Skaith; Jones; Ron Keefe	3:53
4.	"Toulouse"		4:20
5.	"America for Beginners"		5:16
6.	"Eddie"	Skaith; Jones; Keefe	3:08
7.	"No Rope as Long as Time"	Skaith	4:28
8.	"Seaport September"		3:18
9.	"New Millionaires"	Stefe Jeffries; Jones	3:35
10.	"Truth About John"		4:00
11.	"Cora"		2:58
Total length:			42:26

2002 remastered edition bonus tracks
No.	Title	Original release	Length
12.	"Modern Times" (12" Version)		5:48
13.	"Thin White Duke"	"Toulouse" B-side	3:27
14.	"This Side of Midnight" (Live)	"The New Millionaires" B-side	2:46
15.	"Sandinista"	"America for Beginners" B-side	5:33
16.	"Voices Inside"	"No Rope as Long as Time" / "Radio Africa" B-side	3:10
Total length:			63:10

== Charts ==
Chart (1986)	Peak position
Australia (Kent Music Report)	97
UK (Official Charts Company)	91

== Personnel ==
- Carol Douet – vocals, percussion
- Yona Dunsford – vocals, piano
- Greg Harewood – bass
- Steve Jeffries – keyboards, vocals
- Steve Skaith – vocals, guitar
- Richard Stevens – drums, percussion
- Richard Wright – guitar, vocals
- Mike Jones – lyrics

Additional personnel

- Steve Gregory – saxophone
- Martin Ditcham – percussion
- Steve Greetham – bass on "Radio Africa"
- Pete Hammond – mixing, production (except for "Radio Africa")
- Latin Quarter – production (except for "Radio Africa")
- Nigel Gray – mixing, production on "Radio Africa"
- James Swinson – artwork
