= Ignition Records =

British record label

Ignition Records is a British, London based independent record company, owned by Marcus Russell and Alec McKinlay of Ignition Management. The company has been releasing music on a regular basis since the late 1990s, although its inaugural release came in September 1984 with Latin Quarter's hit single, "Radio Africa". The label is distributed by The Orchard.

Throughout the last two decades it has signed and released music by both emerging and established artists e.g. Courteeners.

The company also provides comprehensive label services to various established artists to release on their own label imprints e.g. Stereophonics.

Ignition Records is also the primary label services and marketing operation for Big Brother Recordings (Oasis) and Sour Mash Records (Noel Gallagher's High Flying Birds), which are also based at Ignition Records headquarters in Marylebone, London, England.

== Artists released by Ignition Records ==
- Baby Strange
- Black Rivers
- Band of Skulls
- Chapel Club
- Courteeners
- Darlia
- DSARDY
- Dylan John Thomas
- El Nino
- Far from Saints
- Folks
- Foreign Born
- Hard-Fi
- Hello Operator
- Humanist
- In the Valley Below
- Indigo Lo
- Joe Strummer
- Justin Currie
- Kelly Jones
- Kid Galahad
- Latin Quarter

- Make Friends
- Milky Chance
- Minuteman
- Neon Waltz
- Peace
- Pretty Vicious
- Primal Scream
- Psychedelia Smith
- Public Order
- Pusherman
- Rosborough
- Stereophonics
- Sun Industries
- The Coral
- The Pale White
- Twisted Wheel
- Wilderado
- Young Rebel Set

== Compilation albums ==
Fire & Skill: The Songs of the Jam

== Affiliated labels ==
- Big Brother Recordings
- Sour Mash Records
