= Cocoon (Milky Chance song) =

2016 song by Milky Chance

Single by Milky Chance

from the album Blossom
- Released: 11 November 2016
- Recorded: 2015
- Genre: Indie pop; folktronica
- Length: 4:14
- Label: Lichtdicht
- Songwriter(s): Milky Chance
- Producer(s): Milky Chance, Tobias Kuhn

Milky Chance singles chronology
"Flashed Junk Mind" (2014)	"Cocoon" (2016)	"Doing Good" (2017)

"Cocoon" is a song performed by German duo Milky Chance. It was released as a digital download on 11 November 2016 through Lichtdicht as the lead single from their second studio album Blossom. The song was written by Milky Chance and produced by Milky Chance and Tobias Kuhn.

== Music video ==
A music video to accompany the release of "Cocoon" was filmed in Latvia and first released onto YouTube on 11 November 2016 at a total length of four minutes and forty-eight seconds.

== Track listing ==
Digital download
No.	Title	Length
1.	"Cocoon"	4:14

== Charts ==
=== Weekly charts ===
Chart (2016–17)	Peak position
Australia (ARIA)	10
Austria (Ö3 Austria Top 40)	40
Germany (GfK)	34
Lebanon (Lebanese Top 20)	16
New Zealand Heatseekers (Recorded Music NZ)	5
Slovakia (Rádio Top 100)	54
Slovakia (Singles Digitál Top 100)	95
Slovenia (SloTop50)	42
Switzerland (Schweizer Hitparade)	86
US Alternative Airplay (Billboard)	18
US Hot Rock & Alternative Songs (Billboard)	29

=== Year-end charts ===
Chart (2017)	Position
Australia (ARIA)	94

== Certifications ==
Region	Certification	Certified units/sales
Australia (ARIA)	Platinum	70,000^{‡}
Austria (IFPI Austria)	Gold	15,000^{‡}
Canada (Music Canada)	Platinum	80,000^{‡}
Germany (BVMI)	Gold	200,000^{‡}
New Zealand (RMNZ)	Platinum	30,000^{‡}
United States (RIAA)	Gold	500,000^{‡}
^{‡} Sales+streaming figures based on certification alone.

== Release history ==
Region	Date	Format	Label
Worldwide	11 November 2016	Digital download	Lichtdicht
