= Twickets =

Ticket resale company

Twickets is a ticket resale company based in the United Kingdom.

Billed as a "more ethical ticketing company", it only permits tickets to be resold at or below the designated face value plus booking and delivery fees.

The site has been endorsed by various artists and promoters including Ed Sheeran, Andrew Lloyd Webber, and Sam Fender, and is the official resale marketplace for these and other artists including the Spice Girls and George Ezra.

== Competitors ==
- AXS Marketplace
- FanSale
