= Latin Quarter (band) =

British band

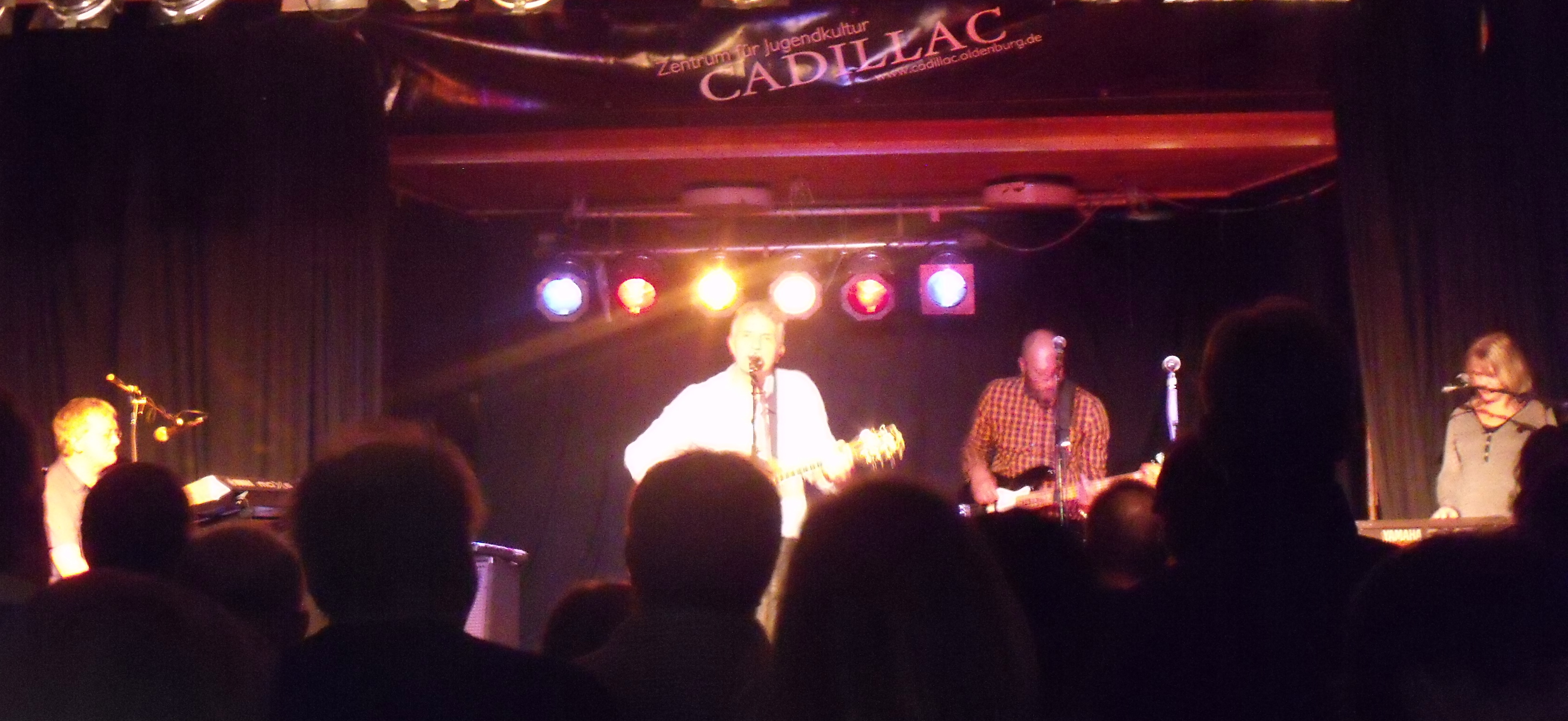

Background information
- Origin: England
- Genres: Pop rock, reggae rock, folk rock
- Years active: 1983–1990, 1992-1997, 2011–present
- Labels: Rockin' Horse Records; Arista; RCA; Westpark Music; Ignition
- Members: Steve Skaith; Steve Jeffries; Mary Carewe; Anna Carewe
- Past members: Mike Jones; Richard Wright; Martin Ditcham; Yona Dunsford; Greg Harewood; Carol Douet; Martin Lascalles; Dave Charles; Richard Stevens; Darren Abraham; John McKenzie Blair Cunningham; Yo Yo Buys
- Website: latinquartermusic.com

Latin Quarter is a British band formed in 1983. They had one top 20 single "Radio Africa" in the United Kingdom.

From the beginning they became more successful in Germany. Latin Quarter released their latest album, Crooks and Crimes, in October 2026. Their sound mixes elements of pop, rock, reggae and folk with largely political based lyrics.

== Career ==
Latin Quarter began when ex-printer and Lincoln-born Steve Skaith left Liverpool for London in 1982 to write songs for music publishers Chappell, together with keyboard player Steve Jeffries. Skaith was also working on some rather more radical music with lyrics from an old friend of his called Mike Jones, both were members from the left wing political group Big Flame.

Mike Jones himself did not play any instruments with Latin Quarter, but he wrote the lyrics to the songs. The former technical school teacher from Liverpool had already been writing political songs for eight years and had been a friend of Steve Skaith's since grammar school. Their political viewpoint were sometimes reflected in the choice of subject matter and lyrics of Latin Quarter's output.

Latin Quarter were managed by Sean Clark and Marcus Russell (who is from Ebbw Vale along with Mike Jones). Clark and Russell formed Ignition Management in 1983. The only problem was that there was no band, just a bunch of songs already written.

Skaith, Jeffries and Jones formed Latin Quarter in autumn 1983 with guitarist Richard Wright, a classically trained musician and ex-member of the Inversions, a band active on the jazz/funk scene, together with drummer Richie Stevens (who had played on Linton Kwesi Johnson album Making History). Yona Dunsford (vocals/piano) and Carol Douet (vocals/percussion) joined the band at the end of the year, with the line-up completed by Greg Harewood on bass. After the band's first sporadic London gigs in 1984, ex-The Police producer Nigel Gray recorded two of Latin Quarter's songs at his own expense, and the band released the single “Radio Africa” on its own independent record label, Ignition, in September 1984.

The band was signed by Rockin’ Horse Records, an offshoot of Arista Records, and completed work on their debut album, Modern Times. After being re-released, “Radio Africa” finally became a UK hit at the start of 1986 when it reached number 19 in the UK Singles Chart.

Jones described their first album Modern Times as "a veritable manifesto". The album only spent two weeks on the UK Albums Chart, peaking at Number 91, but was a top twenty hit in Germany and Sweden, and sold well throughout Europe. The album sold more than 300,000 copies and was dubbed "One of the most exquisite electro-pop albums ever to come out of England" by the New York Daily News. After a European tour in February and March 1986, Latin Quarter played at Glastonbury Festival 21 June 1986. In February 1987 they played at the 'Rock for Peace Festival' in East Berlin at the Palace of the Republic, and in August 1987 at the Hultsfred Festival in Sweden.

Drummer Darren Abraham and keyboard player Martin Lascalles were new members on the follow-up album, Mick And Caroline, released in 1987, which was not as successful. Skaith later told in an interview that he was not satisfied with Jason Corsaros production of the second album.

The band had slimmed down to the quartet of Skaith, Wright, Harewood and Dunsford by their third album Swimming Against the Stream, released 1989 on the RCA label in Germany. They recorded the album in Los Angeles, with producer David Kershenbaum and engineer Paul McKenna, with David Lindley playing violin on two songs. But the album was not released in the US. With all lyrics still written by Jones, the album was dedicated to the eleven workers at Dunnes Stores, Dublin, who were sacked for refusing to handle South Africa goods. Their three-year fight against dismissal culminated in the Irish Government's ban on the importation of South Africa Agricultural produce. The single "Dominion" was originally recorded for the T.V. documentary series Animal Traffic, directed by Arpad Bondy and Ron Orders.

After low sales in the UK the band originally split up. In October 1990, however, another album, entitled Nothing Like Velvet was released, which was made up of unreleased demos, alternative versions and live tracks. Judging by the sleeve notes, the band agreed to the release of these songs.

However, the members, they all stayed friends, meeting each other privately. Skaith, Wright and Jones continued as Latin Quarter, and they collaborated with The Bhundu Boys on the latter's 1993 Friends on the Road album, including a re-working of “Radio Africa” and two new songs written by members of both bands. Latin Quarter, released the albums Long Pig 1993 and Bringing Rosa Home 1997, both on German record labels. Jones thought that the Long Pig album had his best lyrics ever.Bringing Rosa Home was recorded with drummer Blair Cunningham, percussionist Martin Ditcham, and bass player John McKenzie. Latin Quarter finally went on hiatus in 1998.

Jones went on to run courses in Popular Music at the University of Liverpool. Wright became a guitar teacher, in 2004 at Yehudi Menuhin School. Skaith went to live in Mexico where he formed the Steve Skaith Band with Mexican musicians, and released the albums Mexile 2003, Empires and Us 2005 and Imaginary Friend 2007. He then returned to England and re-recorded eleven Latin Quarter songs on Latin Quarter Revisited, 2010. The lyrics for “Radio Africa” were re-written for the album.

In 2011, Skaith and lyricist Jones re-formed Latin Quarter with original vocalist Yona Dunsford, bass player Greg Harewood and keyboard player Steve Jeffries. The band toured Germany and UK and they released the albums Ocean Head in 2012 and Tilt in 2014. Chris Rea was a guest star playing slide guitar on the Tilt album. Steve Skaith released Bare Bones in 2015. The idea for the album was to take early Latin Quarter songs back to the state when they were first written and demoed.

In September 2016, Latin Quarter released The Imagination of Thieves, now featuring Skaith, Jeffries, Martin Ditcham (Drums), Yo Yo Buys (Bass and Guitars) and Mary Carewe (vocals, who also sang on Latin Quarter's early studio demos in the 1980s, before Modern Times was released). Jones now only contributed with lyrics for two of the tracks, "Below The Water" and "Blue Drifting".

In April 2018, Pantomime of Wealth was released on Westpark Music. In addition to the band's political songs about the themes of social justice, the fear of bombing or a terrorist attack, the album also included some very personal titles. Jones contributed with lyrics to “Niamh” and “A Bit Part of Life Itself”.

In April 2019, Latin Quarter released The Colour Scheme, now as a trio featuring Skaith, Jeffries and Carewe. The album consisted eight acoustic rearrangements of early Latin Quarter songs plus “Cut the Cord,” a track from the Steve Skaith Band, and the new track "Little, by Less", with lyrics written by Jones.

In October 2021, they released the album, Releasing The Sheep, which presented a mixture of newly written songs and five freshly revised tracks from the 1980s that were never released by the band with lyrics written by Jones.

In 2023, Latin Quarter announced that they celebrate 40 years since the first rehearsal in 1983, with a tour. On 14 April 2023, they released their first live album, Remember, recorded at The Half Moon in London.

In 2026 Latin Quarter released the album Crooks and Crimes, now joined by cellist Anna Carewe.
