= Ignition Management =

Ignition Management is a music management company with offices in London and Los Angeles. Founded in 1983, Ignition is run by Marcus Russell and Alec McKinlay.

== History ==
Ignition was founded by Russell in 1983, who at the time managed London-based band Latin Quarter. The company's early clients included The Bible, Johnny Marr, The The, Bernard Sumner and Electronic.

In May 1993, Ignition signed their most successful client: Oasis. The band went on to sell over 70 million albums worldwide, and become one of the world biggest touring bands. 1.1 million people attended a 2008-2009 tour, which ended with the band's breakup in September 2009. A reunion tour was announced in 2024; the UK shows sold out in less than an hour, with ten million fans from 158 countries queuing online to buy 1.4 million tickets.

Between 2000–2010, Ignition also managed Mercury Rev and Black Mountain, Neil Finn and Crowded House. In 2016, Russell and McKinlay invested in ticket resale platform Twickets.
