= FIFA 15 =

2014 video game

- Global cover art featuring FC Barcelona's Lionel Messi
- Developer: EA Canada
- Publisher: EA Sports
- Producers: Nick Channon; Sebastian Enrique
- Designer: Simon Humber
- Series: FIFA
- Engine: Ignite (PC, PS4, XOne); Impact (PS3, X360)
- Platforms: Microsoft Windows Consoles: PlayStation 3 PlayStation 4 Wii Xbox 360 Xbox One; Handheld: PlayStation Vita Nintendo 3DS; Mobile: iOS Android Windows Phone
- Release: NA: 23 September 2014; EU/AU: 25 September 2014; UK: 26 September 2014
- Genre: Sports
- Modes: Single-player, multiplayer

FIFA 15 is a football simulation video game developed by EA Canada and published by Electronic Arts under the EA Sports label. It was released on 23 September 2014 in North America, 25 September in Europe and Australia and 26 September in the United Kingdom and Ireland for the PlayStation 3, PlayStation 4, PlayStation Vita, Nintendo 3DS, Wii, Xbox One, Xbox 360, Microsoft Windows, iOS, Android and Windows Phone. On PC for the first time, FIFA 15 runs on EA's Ignite engine with the same features as the PlayStation 3 and Xbox 360 editions. This is the final game in the FIFA series to be available on the Nintendo 3DS, Nintendo Wii and PlayStation Vita, as well as the last game published by Electronic Arts for all three systems.

The game features Lionel Messi on its cover, alongside different players in different parts of the world, and is the first game in the FIFA series to be fully licensed by the Premier League. FIFA 15 received positive reviews across all platforms, although the PC version in particular was criticized for the amount of bugs that were featured at release.

For the third consecutive edition, the main commentators for the game are Martin Tyler and Alan Smith while commentators for international matches are Clive Tyldesley and Andy Townsend.

== Ultimate Team ==
Concept squad, one of the new Ultimate Team features

FIFA 15's Ultimate Team introduced a new feature, in which users can sign loan players for a limited duration of matches. Another new feature is The Concept Squad, where players are given access to the game's database and can create a "dream squad". The concept players card is grey colored. A number of new legends are also introduced to the game, including Franz Beckenbauer, Roberto Carlos, Peter Schmeichel and Hristo Stoichkov which are only available on Xbox One and Xbox 360.

== Goal celebrations ==
New goal celebrations featured in the game include Luis Suárez's 'kiss the wrist' routine, Zlatan Ibrahimović kicking the corner flag, and Cristiano Ronaldo's celebration from his second goal vs Sweden in the qualifying play-offs for the 2014 World Cup where he raises both arms and points downwards.

== Licensing ==
A demo was released on 9 September 2014, with three new teams – Chelsea, Liverpool and Napoli – alongside the previous game's demo's teams: Borussia Dortmund, FC Barcelona, Manchester City, Boca Juniors and Paris Saint-Germain.

A full list of the game's leagues, clubs and national teams was published on its official website on 18 September with the description "Experience true football authenticity with FIFA 15 – featuring 35 licensed leagues, over 600 clubs, 16,000+ players and 41 licensed stadiums".

EA Sports had signed a deal with the Premier League as the Official Sports Technology Partner. In this way EA are licensed under Premier League development. This deal allows all 20 Premier League stadiums to be included in the game, including the seven stadiums from FIFA 14. Official Premier League scoreboards and television graphics are also in the game, as well as real-life referees, chants and advertising hoardings.

The Italian Serie A is fully licensed in FIFA 15. All Serie B teams except the three relegated from the 2013–14 Serie A, and several Argentine clubs, feature with generic crests and kits. The Campeonato Brasileiro Série A and Brazilian clubs are not licensed, due to a failure to reach agreement with the rights holders, but the Turkish Süper Lig returns to the series. The Brazil national football team feature in the game, despite the domestic league not being included.

One of the new features added for FIFA 15 is that all 20 Premier League stadiums are included and officially licensed. On 19 September a list of stadiums in the game was published on its website, alongside 31 generic stadiums.

Lionel Messi returns as the main cover star for all regions on the global cover. Messi has starred on the cover of all instalments of the FIFA franchise since FIFA 13, when he replaced Wayne Rooney. Some regions also have a player from that region starring on the cover with Messi. Nintendo's platforms may not have localised variants of the game cover available, or feature an additional player, in select regions.

== Release ==
On September 2015, a major update of the iOS and Android versions called FIFA 15 Ultimate Team: New Season, with their kits and team squads updated to the 2015–16 season and using similar user interface from FIFA 16. This update was released for some users did not have powerful smartphone to play the mobile version of FIFA 16 Ultimate Team.

== Reception ==
Reception

Aggregate scores
Aggregator	Score
GameRankings	(PS4) 81.57% (XONE) 82.17% (PC) 64.00%
Metacritic	(PS4) 82/100 (XONE) 84/100 (PC) 82/100

Review scores
Publication	Score
Eurogamer	7/10
Game Informer	9.25/10
GameSpot	8/10
GamesRadar+	4.5/5
IGN	8.3/10
Official Xbox Magazine (US)	8/10
PC Gamer (US)	78/100
Hardcore Gamer	4/5

FIFA 15 received generally positive reviews from critics. Review aggregation website GameRankings provides an average rating of 81.57% based on 15 reviews for the PlayStation 4 version. The Xbox One version received a similar average of 82.17% based on 12 reviews, and the PC version 64.00% based on 2 reviews. Another review aggregation website Metacritic gave the PlayStation 4 version an 82/100 based on 29 reviews, the Xbox One 84/100 based on 19 reviews and the PC version 82/100 based on 5 reviews.

During the 18th Annual D.I.C.E. Awards, the Academy of Interactive Arts & Sciences awarded FIFA 15 with "Sports Game of the Year".

Chris Schilling of IGN gave the game a score of 83%, saying "FIFA 15 is still one of the best sports simulations around, with superb animation and big-match atmosphere", although finding flaws in the frequent use of cutaways and the quality of the game's artificial intelligence.

A score of 8 out of 10 was given by GameSpot writer John Robertson, who concluded "If you're looking for football that is exciting, exaggerated, and immensely entertaining, FIFA 15 is the game to get" but was critical of the game's commentary.

Steve Hannley of Hardcore Gamer gave the game a 4 out of 5, saying "Shrewdly taking advantage of current-gen's capabilities with added emotional intelligence and improved animations, this is easily the prettiest EA Sports title this year", but he criticised the "relatively unchanged" game modes.

Some users complained that their version of FIFA 15 suffered from lagging, stuttering and audio looping, as well as gameplay bugs and lighting issues. Patches have been released for the PC version of the game, fixing several bugs, but the major stuttering issue remains unresolved.
