= The Darkness discography =

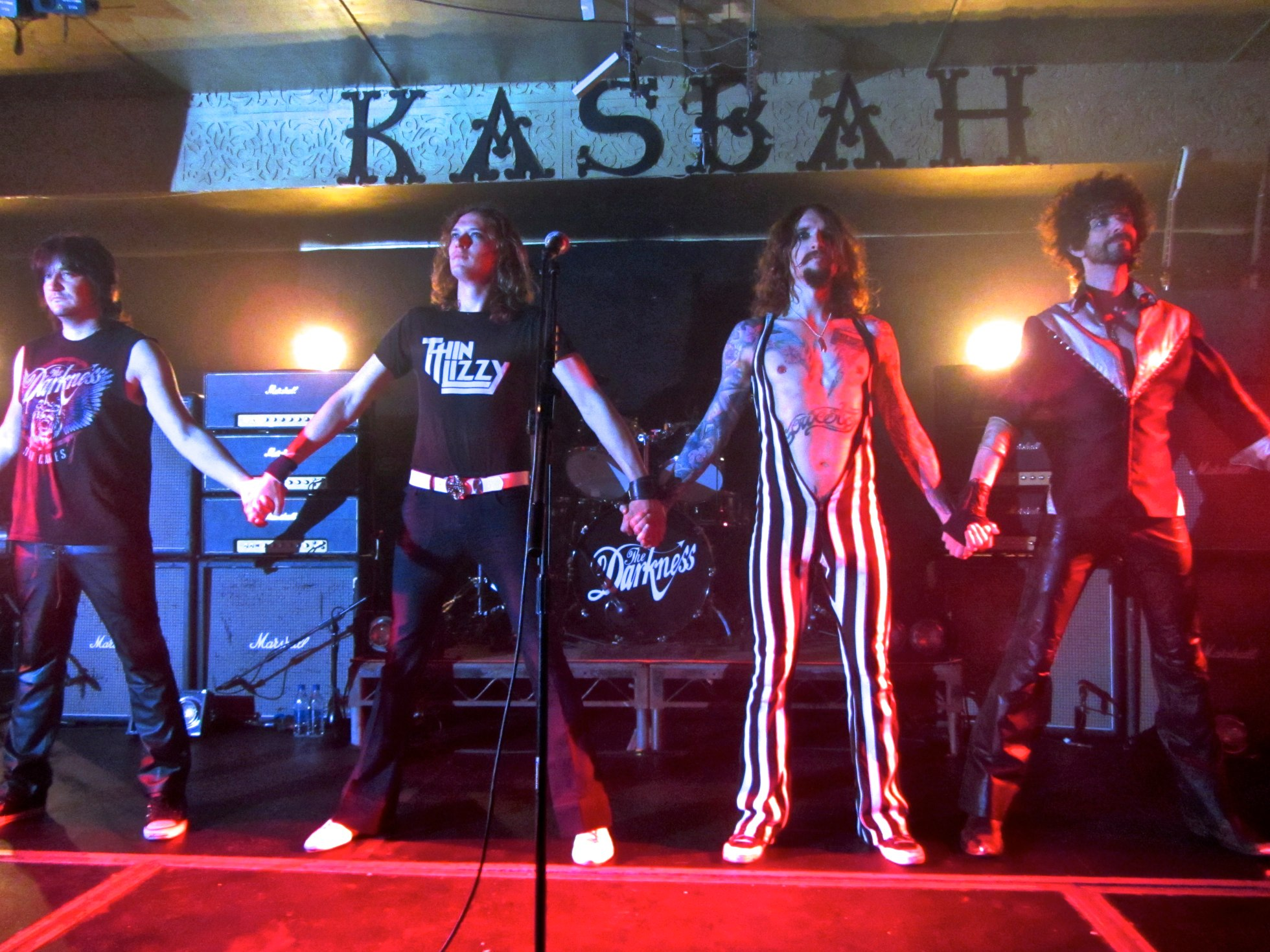
- The 2013 lineup of The Darkness. From left to right: Ed Graham, Dan Hawkins, Justin Hawkins, Frankie Poullain.
- Studio albums: 8
- Extended plays: 1
- Live albums: 2
- Compilation albums: 2
- Singles: 32
- Music videos: 27
- Box sets: 1

As of November 2026, the discography of The Darkness, a British hard rock band, consists of eight studio albums, two compilation albums, five live albums, one extended play (EP), one box set, thirty-six singles and twenty-five music videos.

The band released their debut EP I Believe in a Thing Called Love through label Must Destroy in August 2002. The Darkness released their first two singles, "Get Your Hands Off My Woman" and "Growing on Me" in 2003, which reached peaks of 52 and 11 on the UK Singles Chart, respectively. These were followed in September by the band's debut album Permission to Land, which topped the UK Albums Chart and was certified four-times platinum by the British Phonographic Industry. Later singles from the album "I Believe in a Thing Called Love" and "Love Is Only a Feeling" peaked on the UK Singles Chart at numbers two and five respectively, while the Christmas single "Christmas Time (Don't Let the Bells End)" achieved the 2003 Christmas number two spot.

Their second album, One Way Ticket to Hell... and Back, was released in November 2005, preceded by the single "One Way Ticket"; the album was significantly less successful than its predecessor, reaching number eleven on the UK Albums Chart and receiving a silver certification from the BPI. Both "One Way Ticket" and follow-up single "Is It Just Me?" reached number eight on the singles chart, while the third and final single from the album, "Girlfriend", charted at number 39.

Following the band's first break up in 2006, The Platinum Collection compilation and a set comprising both of the band's albums were released in 2008.

The band reunited in 2011 then released "Nothing's Gonna Stop Us" in February 2012, followed by "Every Inch of You" in May, then "Everybody Have a Good Time" in June. The band's third album, Hot Cakes, was released in August 2012, reaching number four on the UK Albums Chart.

The band's fourth album, Last of Our Kind, was released on 2 June 2015, and their fifth album Pinewood Smile was released on 6 October 2017.

On 25 April 2018, it was announced that the Darkness would release their first live album Live at Hammersmith on 15 June 2018 with "Buccaneers of Hispaniola" (live) and "I Believe in a Thing Called Love" (live) available on the day of announcement. "Solid Gold" (live) was released on 1 June.

The Darkness released their sixth album Easter Is Cancelled on 4 October 2019. There were three singles released prior to the album—"Rock and Roll Deserves to Die", "Heart Explodes" and the title track, "Easter Is Cancelled". Two further singles were released afterwards, "How Can I Lose Your Love" and "In Another Life" in December 2019 and January 2020 respectively.

The band's seventh album Motorheart was released on 19 November 2021. The title track served as the lead single, followed by "Nobody Can See Me Cry", "Jussy's Girl", and "It's Love, Jim".

On 18 September 2024, the Darkness announced their eighth studio album Dreams on Toast would be released 28 March 2025 and the first single, "The Longest Kiss" was released with an accompanying visualizer. A UK headline tour in support of the album was announced at the same time. To date, six singles have been released: "The Longest Kiss", "I Hate Myself", "Rock and Roll Party Cowboy", "Walking Through Fire", "The Battle for Gadget Land" (announced as an exclusive perk of purchasing a special lanyard at the merch stand on tour dates preceding the album's release) and "Hot on My Tail".

On 22 May 2026 The Darkness released "Masters of the Universe", the title track of the Masters of the Universe (2026) movie.

== Albums ==
=== Studio albums ===
List of studio albums with selected chart positions and sales certifications
Title	Album details	Peak chart positions										Sales	Certifications
Title	Album details	UK	AUS	AUT	FIN	GER	IRL	JPN	SWE	SWI	US	Sales	Certifications
Permission to Land	Released: 16 September 2003 (US); Label: Atlantic; Formats: CD, LP	1	17	40	17	19	2	5	8	59	36	UK: 1,500,000; US: 710,000; WW: 3,000,000	BPI: 4× Platinum; ARIA: Platinum; MC: Platinum; RMNZ: Platinum; RIAA: Gold
One Way Ticket to Hell... and Back	Released: 29 November 2005; Label: Atlantic; Formats: CD, LP	11	25	44	31	32	20	26	22	48	58	UK: 100,000	BPI: Gold; ARIA: Gold
Hot Cakes	Released: 21 August 2012; Label: Canary Dwarf; Formats: CD, LP, DL	4	15	24	46	16	14	50	30	20	43	US: 26,000	
Last of Our Kind	Released: 2 June 2015; Label: Canary Dwarf; Formats: CD, LP, DL	12	23	53	41	56	49	57	—	43	125		
Pinewood Smile	Released: 6 October 2017; Label: Cooking Vinyl; Formats: CD, LP, DL	8	17	—	—	—	—	166	—	90	190		
Easter Is Cancelled	Released: 4 October 2019; Label: Cooking Vinyl; Formats: CD, LP, DL	10	22	—	—	60	31	—	—	79	— (Note: Easter Is Cancelled did not enter the US Billboard 200, but peaked at number 41 on the Album Sales Chart.)		
Motorheart	Released: 19 November 2021; Label: Cooking Vinyl; Formats: CD, LP, DL	16	96	—	—	—	—	—	—	99	— (Note: Motorheart did not enter the US Billboard 200, but peaked at number 91 on the Top Current Album Sales Chart.)		
Dreams on Toast	Released: 28 March 2025; Label: Cooking Vinyl; Formats: CD, LP, cassette, DL	2	45	37	—	58	89	—	—	49	—		

=== Compilation albums ===
List of compilation albums
Title	Album details	Certifications
The Platinum Collection	Released: 7 April 2008; Label: Rhino; Format: CD	BPI: Silver
Croc of Hits	Released: 27 November 2026; Label: Cooking Vinyl; Format: CD, Vinyl,	BPI:

=== Live albums ===
Title	Album details	Peak chart positions				
Title	Album details	UK	UK Sales	UK Indie	UK Rock	SCO
Blast of Our Kind Tour – London Roundhouse - 20 Dec 2015	Released: 2016; Label: All About Live; Format: USB	—	—	—	—	—
Blast of Our Kind Tour – The Best Of	Released: 2016; Label: All About Live; Format: USB	—	—	—	—	—
Live at Hammersmith	Released: 15 June 2018; Label: Canary Dwarf; Format: Various	47	23	4	1	25
Streaming of a White Christmas	Released: 2 July 2021; Label: Live Here Now; Format: CD, DL	—	51	16	22	87
One Way Ticket to Birminham - Live at the NEC 2006	Released: 18 April 2026; Label: Atlantic; Format: LP	__	__	__	__	__
"—" denotes a title that did not chart, or was not released in that territory.

== Extended plays ==
Title	Details	Peak chart positions	
Title	Details	UK Indie	UK Rock
I Believe in a Thing Called Love	Released: 12 August 2002; Label: Must Destroy; Format: CD	43	20

== Box sets ==
List of box sets
Title	Album details
Permission to Land/One Way Ticket to Hell... and Back	Released: 4 August 2008; Label: Warner; Format: 2CD

== Singles ==
List of singles with selected chart positions, showing year and album name
Title	Year	Peak chart positions											Certifications	Album
Title	Year	UK	AUS	BEL	DEN	GER	IRL	NED	NOR	NZ	SWE	US Bub.	Certifications	Album
"Get Your Hands off My Woman"	2003	43	—	—	—	—	—	—	—	—	—	—		Permission to Land
"Growing on Me"	2003	11	46	—	—	—	42	—	—	—	—	—		Permission to Land
"I Believe in a Thing Called Love"	2003	2	40	— (Note: "I Believe in a Thing Called Love" did not enter the Flanders Ultratop 50, but peaked at number 2 on the Ultratip.)	—	47	5	12	14	10	8	19	BPI: Platinum; RIAA: Platinum	Permission to Land
"Christmas Time (Don't Let the Bells End)"	2003	2	63	—	9	—	2	—	20	—	—	—	BPI: Platinum	Permission to Land (Christmas Edition)
"Love Is Only a Feeling"	2004	5	35	—	—	95	10	92	—	22	55	—	BPI: Silver	Permission to Land
"One Way Ticket"	2005	8	36	— (Note: "One Way Ticket" did not enter the Flanders Ultratop 50, but peaked at number 14 on the Ultratip.)	20	75	22	—	19	15	31	—		One Way Ticket to Hell... and Back
"Is It Just Me?"	2006	8	39	—	—	—	36	—	—	—	—	—		One Way Ticket to Hell... and Back
"Girlfriend"	2006	39	—	—	—	—	40	—	—	—	—	—		One Way Ticket to Hell... and Back
"Nothing's Gonna Stop Us"	2012	—	—	—	—	—	—	—	—	—	—	—		Hot Cakes
"Every Inch of You"	2012	— (Note: "Every Inch of You" did not enter the UK Singles Chart, but peaked at number 29 on the UK Rock & Metal Singles Chart.)	—	—	—	—	—	—	—	—	—	—		Hot Cakes
"Everybody Have a Good Time"	2012	—	—	—	—	—	—	—	—	—	—	—		Hot Cakes
"With a Woman"	2013	—	—	—	—	—	—	—	—	—	—	—		Hot Cakes
"The Horn"	2013	— (Note: "The Horn" did not enter the UK Singles Chart, but peaked at number 46 on the UK Physical Singles Chart.)	—	—	—	—	—	—	—	—	—	—		Extra Hot Cakes – Yuletide Edition
"Barbarian"	2015	—	—	—	—	—	—	—	—	—	—	—		Last of Our Kind
"Open Fire"	2015	—	—	—	—	—	—	—	—	—	—	—		Last of Our Kind
"Last of Our Kind"	2015	—	—	—	—	—	—	—	—	—	—	—		Last of Our Kind
"Million Dollar Strong"	2015	—	—	—	—	—	—	—	—	—	—	—		Last of Our Kind (Deluxe Edition)
"I Am Santa"	2015	—	—	—	—	—	—	—	—	—	—	—		Last of Our Kind (Deluxe Edition)
"All the Pretty Girls"	2017	—	—	—	—	—	—	—	—	—	—	—		Pinewood Smile
"Solid Gold"	2017	—	—	—	—	—	—	—	—	—	—	—		Pinewood Smile
"Southern Trains"	2017	—	—	—	—	—	—	—	—	—	—	—		Pinewood Smile
"Happiness"	2017	—	—	—	—	—	—	—	—	—	—	—		Pinewood Smile
"Rock and Roll Deserves to Die"	2019	—	—	—	—	—	—	—	—	—	—	—		Easter Is Cancelled
"Heart Explodes"	2019	—	—	— (Note: "Heart Explodes" did not enter the Flanders Ultratop 50, but was featured on the Ultratip "Extra Tips" chart.)	—	—	—	—	—	—	—	—		Easter Is Cancelled
"Easter Is Cancelled"	2019	—	—	—	—	—	—	—	—	—	—	—		Easter Is Cancelled
"How Can I Lose Your Love"	2019	—	—	—	—	—	—	—	—	—	—	—		Easter Is Cancelled
"In Another Life"	2020	—	—	—	—	—	—	—	—	—	—	—		Easter Is Cancelled
"Motorheart"	2021	—	—	—	—	—	—	—	—	—	—	—		Motorheart
"Nobody Can See Me Cry"	2021	—	—	—	—	—	—	—	—	—	—	—		Motorheart
"Jussy's Girl"	2021	—	—	—	—	—	—	—	—	—	—	—		Motorheart
"It's Love, Jim"	2021	—	—	—	—	—	—	—	—	—	—	—		Motorheart
"The Longest Kiss"	2024	—	—	—	—	—	—	—	—	—	—	—		Dreams on Toast
"I Hate Myself"	2024	—	—	—	—	—	—	—	—	—	—	—		Dreams on Toast
"Rock and Roll Party Cowboy"	2025	—	—	—	—	—	—	—	—	—	—	—		Dreams on Toast
"Walking Through Fire"	2025	—	—	—	—	—	—	—	—	—	—	—		Dreams on Toast
"The Battle for Gadget Land"	2025	—	—	—	—	—	—	—	—	—	—	—		Dreams on Toast
"Hot on My Tail"	2025	—	—	—	—	—	—	—	—	—	—	—		Dreams on Toast
"Masters of the Universe"	2026	—	—	—	—	—	—	—	—	—	—	—		Masters of the Universe Soundtrack
"—" denotes a title that did not chart, or was not released in that territory.

=== Promotional singles ===
List of physical promotional singles, showing year released as single and album name
Title	Year	Peak chart positions	Album
Title	Year	BEL (WA) Tip	Album
"Friday Night"	2004	—	Permission to Land
"Get Your Hands off My Woman... Again"	2004	—	Permission to Land
"Everybody Have a Good Time"	2012	46	Hot Cakes
"Keep Me Hangin' On"	2013	—	Hot Cakes
"Last of Our Kind"	2015	—	Last of Our Kind
"I Am Santa"	2015	—	Last of Our Kind (Deluxe Edition)
"Solid Gold"	2017	—	Pinewood Smile
"Happiness"	2017	—	Pinewood Smile

== Music videos ==
List of music videos, showing year and directors
Title	Year	Director(s)
"Get Your Hands off My Woman"	2003	unknown
"Growing on Me"	2003	unknown
"I Believe in a Thing Called Love"	2003	Alex Smith
"Friday Night"	2003	unknown
"Christmas Time (Don't Let the Bells End)"	2003	unknown
"Love Is Only a Feeling"	2004	unknown
"One Way Ticket"	2005	Tim Pope
"Is It Just Me?"	2006	Tim Pope
"Girlfriend"	2006	Tim Pope
"Nothin's Gonna Stop Us"	2012	Thom Lessner, Ted Passon
"Every Inch of You"	2012	unknown
"Everybody Have a Good Time"	2012	Warren Fu
"With a Woman"	2013	Warren Fu
"Barbarian"	2015	unknown
"Open Fire"	2015	unknown
"Last of Our Kind"	2015	unknown
"I Am Santa"	2015	unknown
"All the Pretty Girls"	2017	unknown
"Solid Gold"	2017	unknown
"Southern Trains"	2017	unknown
"Happiness"	2017	unknown
"Rock and Roll Deserves to Die"	2019	unknown
"Heart Explodes"	2019	unknown
"In Another Life"	2020	Kristy Currie
"Motorheart"	2021	unknown
"Nobody Can See Me Cry"	2021	Arepo
"Jussy's Girl"	2021	Arepo
