= List of songs recorded by the Darkness =

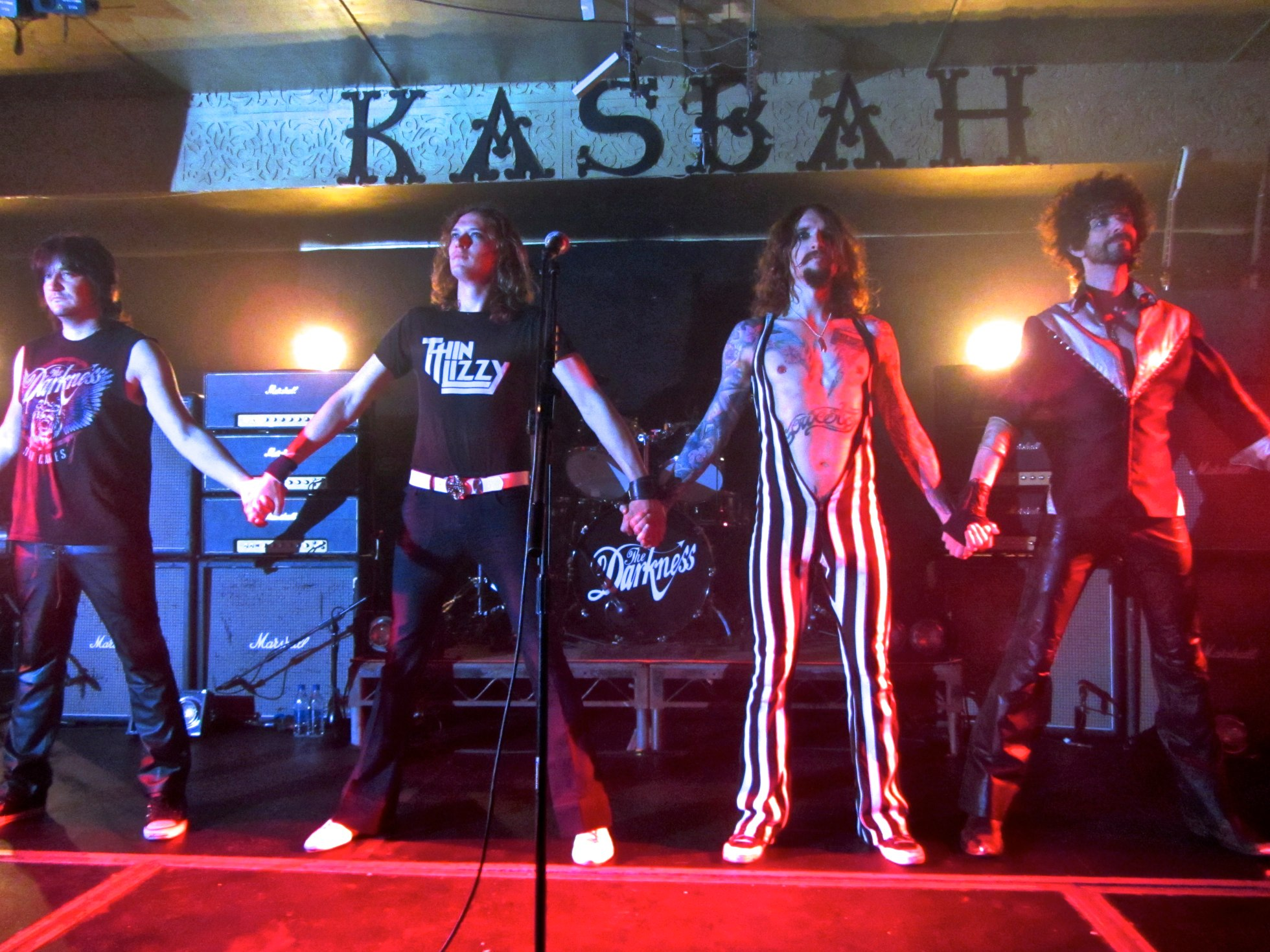
A former lineup of The Darkness in 2013. From left to right: Ed Graham, Dan Hawkins, Justin Hawkins, Frankie Poullain. The current lineup includes Rufus Tiger Taylor in place of Graham.

The Darkness is an English hard rock band formed in Lowestoft, Suffolk in 2000. Their first release was the extended play I Believe in a Thing Called Love in August 2002, which featured the tracks "I Believe in a Thing Called Love", "Love on the Rocks with No Ice" and "Love Is Only a Feeling", all of which were later featured on the band's debut album. After signing with Atlantic Records, the band released their debut album Permission to Land in July, which featured a total of ten tracks. Singles released to support the album were "Get Your Hands off My Woman", "Growing on Me", "I Believe in a Thing Called Love" and "Love Is Only a Feeling", all of which featured new B-sides. The B-sides "The Best of Me" (from "Get Your Hands Off My Woman") and "Makin' Out" (from "I Believe in a Thing Called Love") were also featured on the Japanese edition of Permission to Land. "Christmas Time (Don't Let the Bells End)" was released at the end of the year, and also featured on the Christmas reissue of the album.

The band's second album, One Way Ticket to Hell... and Back, was released in November 2005, and also featured ten tracks. The album was supported by the release of singles "One Way Ticket", "Is It Just Me?" and "Girlfriend"; the first two featured new B-sides, while the third featured remixes of the A-side. The B-side "Grief Hammer", originally from the single "One Way Ticket", was also featured on the Japanese edition of One Way Ticket to Hell... and Back. The band broke up in 2006, and in 2008 the compilation album The Platinum Collection and box set Permission to Land/One Way Ticket to Hell... were released, each featuring all 20 songs from the band's first two albums ("Christmas Time (Don't Let the Bells End)" was also included on The Platinum Collection).

The Darkness reunited in 2011, and in August 2012 they released their third album, Hot Cakes. The album features eleven tracks, including the band's first studio cover version, of Radiohead's "Street Spirit (Fade Out)". The deluxe edition of Hot Cakes features four additional tracks, three of which are new songs; the bonus track "Cannonball" features Ian Anderson of the band Jethro Tull on flute. In 2014 Graham left the band again, to be replaced by Emily Dolan Davies, who performed on the band's fourth album Last of Our Kind. Davies later left herself, and was replaced by Rufus Tiger Taylor.

== Songs ==
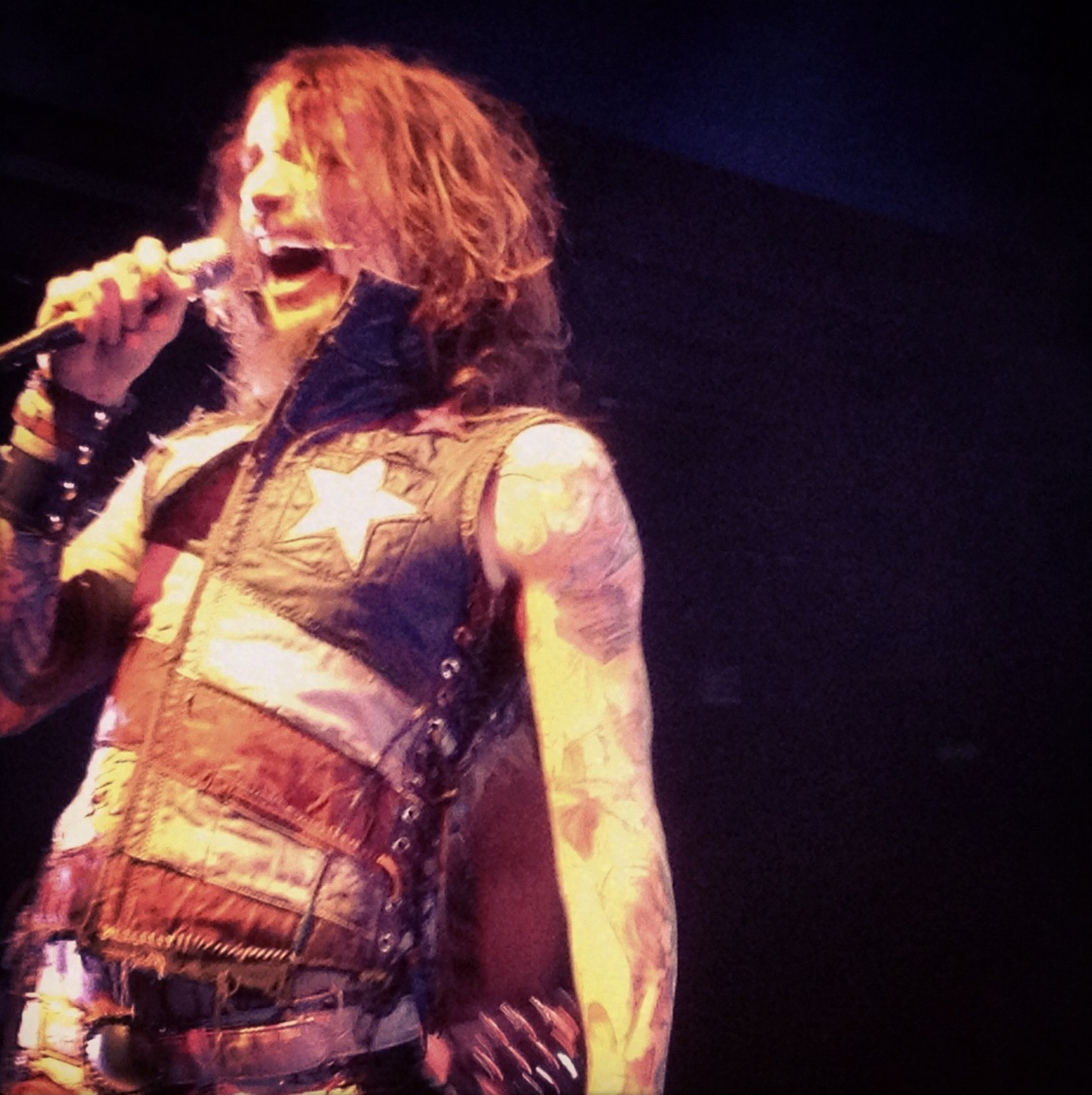
Frontman Justin Hawkins has performed lead vocals and guitar with the band since their formation in 2000.

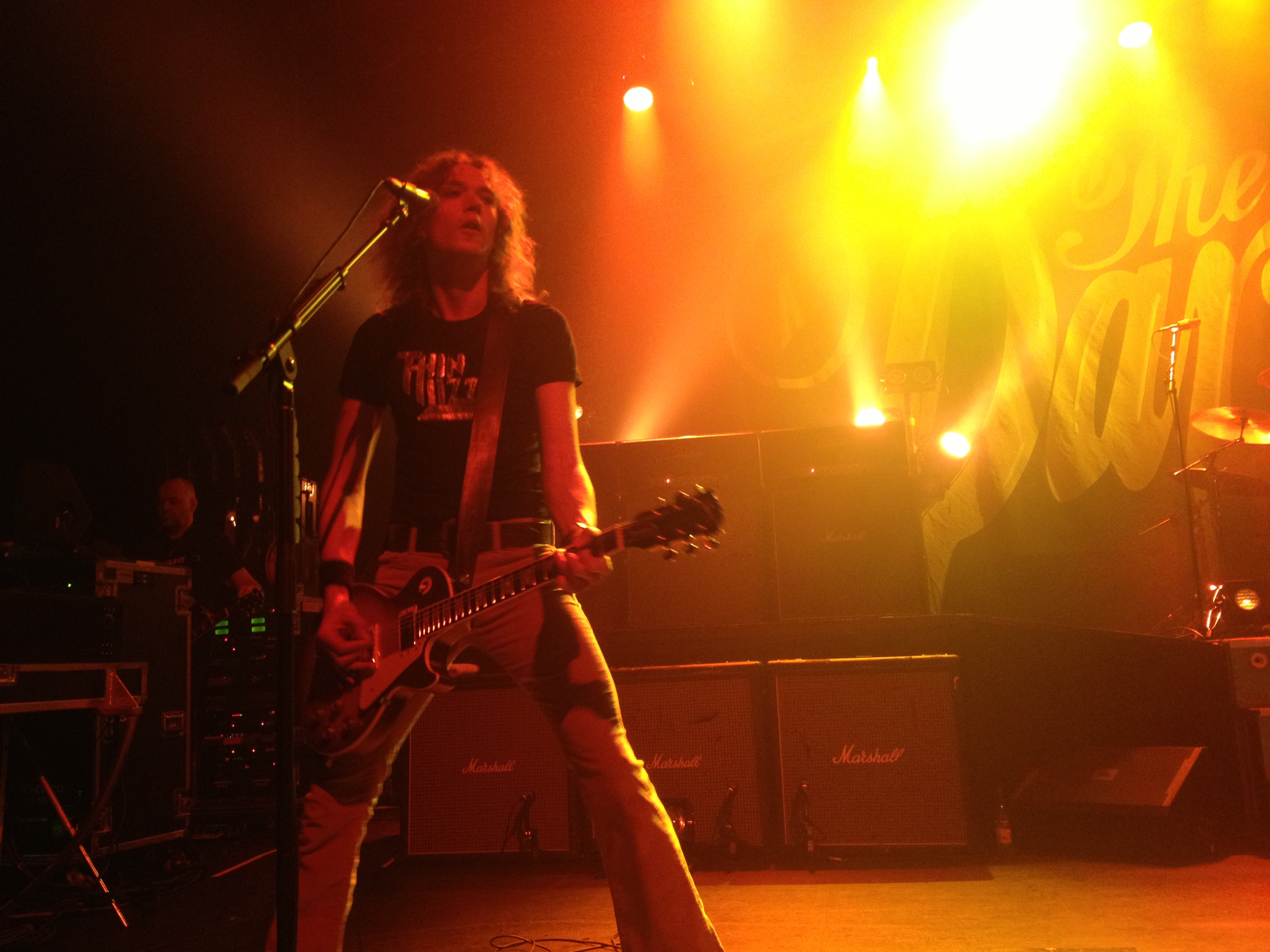
Along with his brother Justin, guitarist Dan Hawkins has co-written every original track by The Darkness.

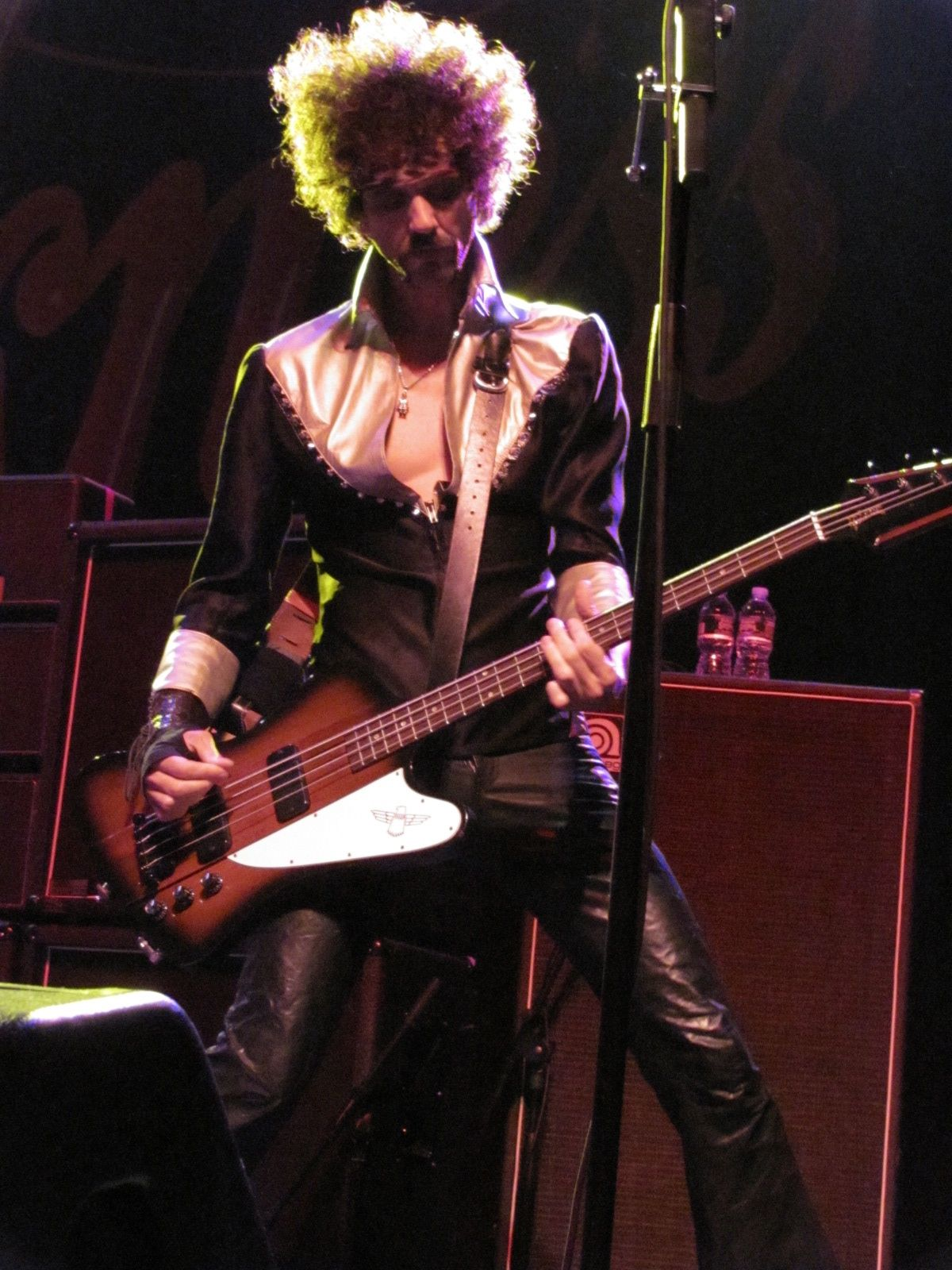
Bassist Frankie Poullain has contributed to songwriting on all three The Darkness albums, including all of Permission to Land.

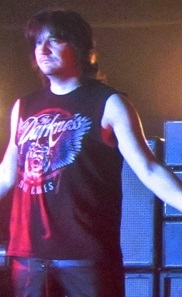
Drummer Ed Graham has performed on all three albums by the band, co-writing all of Permission to Land and the track "Bald".

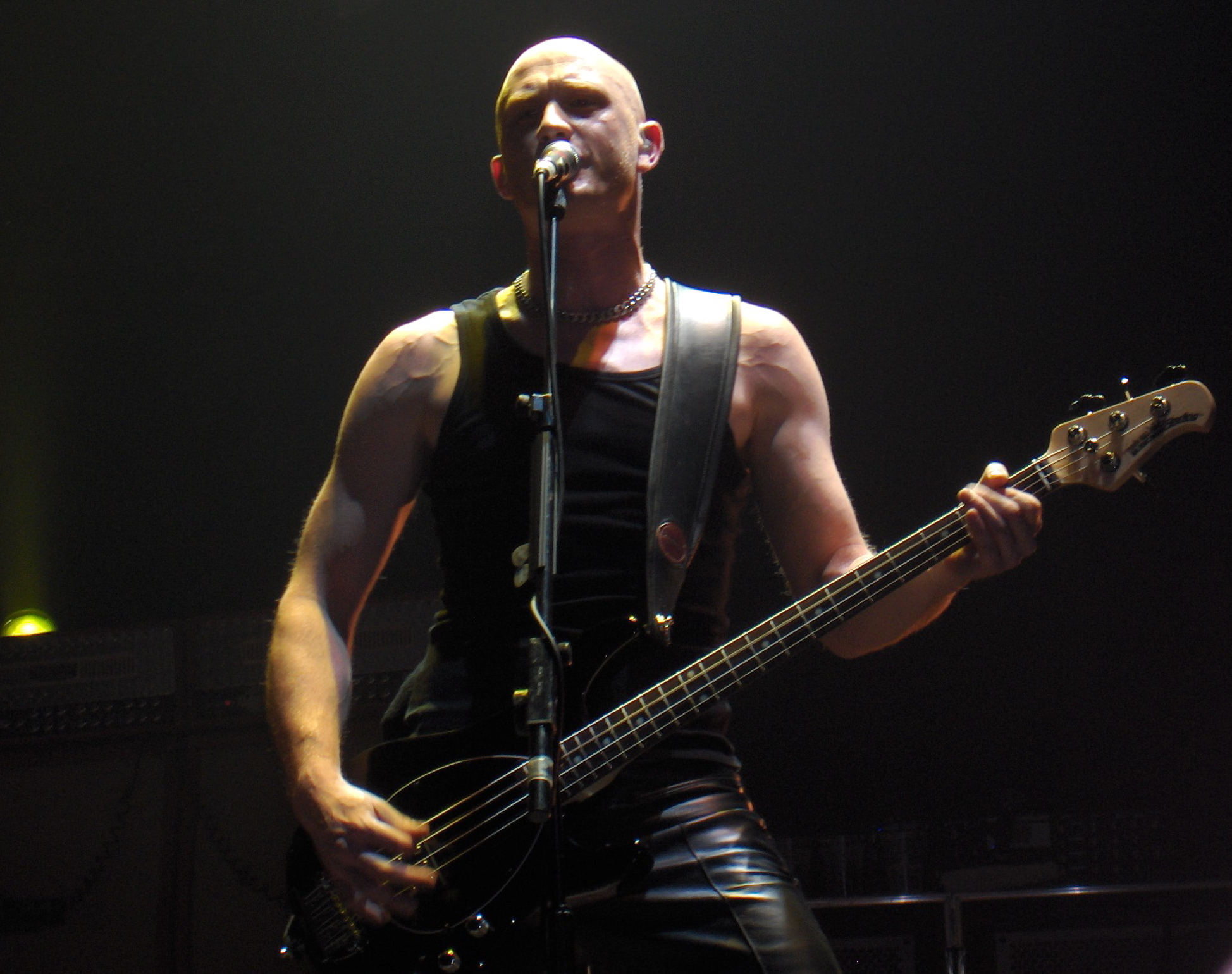
Richie Edwards replaced Poullain in 2005 and performed bass guitar on One Way Ticket to Hell... and Back.

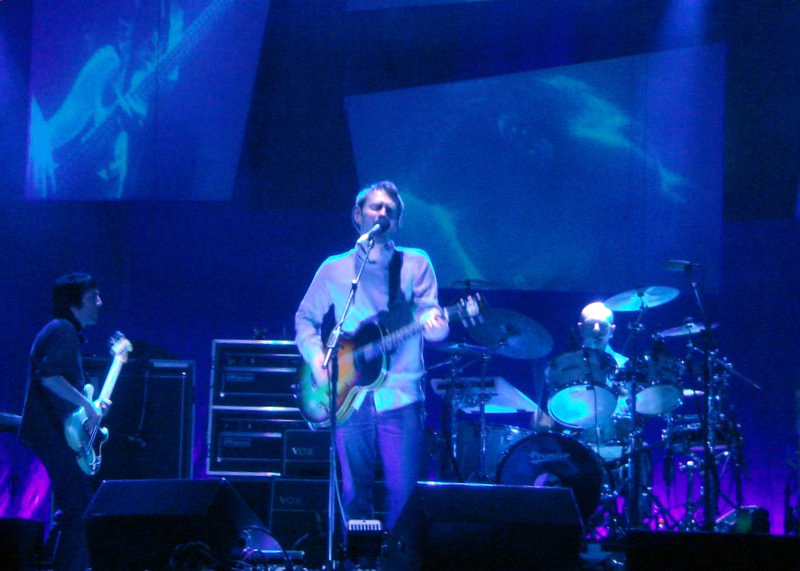
Hot Cakes features a cover version of "Street Spirit (Fade Out)", originally written and recorded by Radiohead.

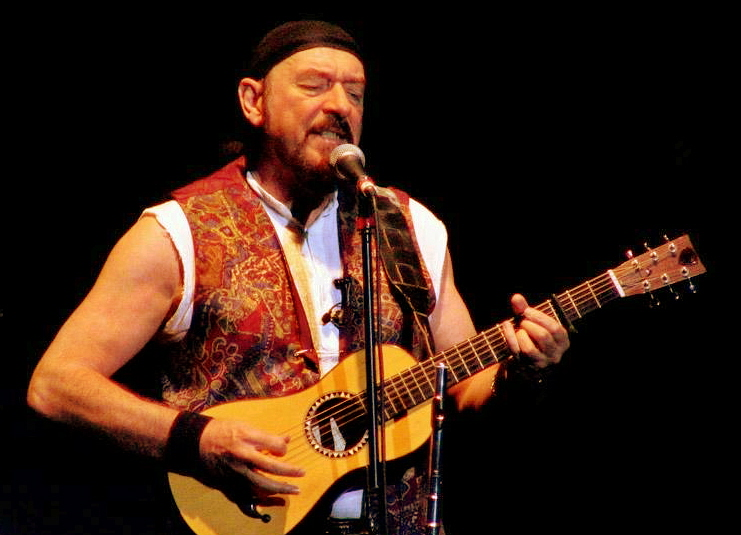
Jethro Tull frontman Ian Anderson performed flute on Hot Cakes bonus track "Cannonball".

Key
†	Indicates song released as a single
‡	Indicates song written by the whole band

Title	Writer(s)	Release	Year	Ref.	Notes
"All The Pretty Girls" †	Justin Hawkins; Dan Hawkins; Frankie Poullain; Rufus Tiger Taylor ‡	Pinewood Smile	2017		
"Always Had the Blues"	Justin Hawkins; Dan Hawkins; Frankie Poullain	Last of Our Kind	2015		^{[A]}
"Bald"	Justin Hawkins; Dan Hawkins; Ed Graham	One Way Ticket to Hell... and Back	2005		^{[B]}
"Barbarian" †	Justin Hawkins; Dan Hawkins; Frankie Poullain	Last of Our Kind	2015		
"Bareback"	Justin Hawkins; Dan Hawkins; Frankie Poullain; Ed Graham ‡	"Growing on Me"	2003		
"The Battle for Gadget Land"	Justin Hawkins; Dan Hawkins; Frankie Poullain; Rufus Tiger Taylor ‡	Dreams on Toast	2025		
"The Best of Me"	Justin Hawkins; Dan Hawkins; Frankie Poullain; Ed Graham ‡	"Get Your Hands off My Woman"	2003		^{[G]}
"Black Shuck"	Justin Hawkins; Dan Hawkins; Frankie Poullain; Ed Graham ‡	Permission to Land	2003		^{[B]}
"Blind Man"	Justin Hawkins; Dan Hawkins	One Way Ticket to Hell... and Back	2005		^{[B]}
"Buccaneers of Hispaniola"	Justin Hawkins; Dan Hawkins; Frankie Poullain; Rufus Tiger Taylor ‡	Pinewood Smile	2017		
"Cannonball"	Justin Hawkins; Dan Hawkins; Frankie Poullain	Hot Cakes	2012		^{[C]}
"Christmas Time (Don't Let the Bells End)" †	Justin Hawkins; Dan Hawkins; Frankie Poullain; Ed Graham ‡	Permission to Land	2003		^{[B]}^{[D]}
"Cold Hearted Woman"	Justin Hawkins; Dan Hawkins; Frankie Poullain; Rufus Tiger Taylor ‡	Dreams on Toast	2025		
"Concrete"	Justin Hawkins; Dan Hawkins; Frankie Poullain	Hot Cakes	2012		
"Conquerors"	Justin Hawkins; Dan Hawkins; Frankie Poullain	Last of Our Kind	2015		
"Curse of the Tollund Man"	Justin Hawkins; Dan Hawkins; Frankie Poullain; Ed Graham ‡	"Love Is Only a Feeling"	2004		
"Dinner Lady Arms"	Justin Hawkins; Dan Hawkins	One Way Ticket to Hell... and Back	2005		^{[B]}
"Don't Need Sunshine"	Justin Hawkins; Dan Hawkins; Frankie Poullain; Rufus Tiger Taylor ‡	Dreams on Toast	2025		
"English Country Garden"	Justin Hawkins; Dan Hawkins	One Way Ticket to Hell... and Back	2005		^{[B]}
"Every Inch of You" †	Justin Hawkins; Dan Hawkins	Hot Cakes	2012		
"Everybody Have a Good Time" †	Justin Hawkins; Dan Hawkins	Hot Cakes	2012		
"Forbidden Love"	Justin Hawkins; Dan Hawkins; Frankie Poullain	Hot Cakes	2012		
"Friday Night"	Justin Hawkins; Dan Hawkins; Frankie Poullain; Ed Graham ‡	Permission to Land	2003		^{[B]}
"Get Your Hands off My Woman" †	Justin Hawkins; Dan Hawkins; Frankie Poullain; Ed Graham ‡	Permission to Land	2003		^{[B]}
"Girlfriend" †	Justin Hawkins; Dan Hawkins	One Way Ticket to Hell... and Back	2005		^{[B]}
"Givin' Up"	Justin Hawkins; Dan Hawkins; Frankie Poullain; Ed Graham ‡	Permission to Land	2003		^{[B]}
"Grief Hammer"	Justin Hawkins; Dan Hawkins	"One Way Ticket"	2005		^{[E]}
"Growing on Me" †	Justin Hawkins; Dan Hawkins; Frankie Poullain; Ed Graham ‡	Permission to Land	2003		^{[B]}
"Hammer & Tongs"	Justin Hawkins; Dan Hawkins; Frankie Poullain	Last of Our Kind	2015		
"Happiness" †	Justin Hawkins; Dan Hawkins; Frankie Poullain; Rufus Tiger Taylor ‡	Pinewood Smile	2017		
"Hazel Eyes"	Justin Hawkins; Dan Hawkins	One Way Ticket to Hell... and Back	2005		^{[B]}
"Holding My Own"	Justin Hawkins; Dan Hawkins; Frankie Poullain; Ed Graham ‡	Permission to Land	2003		^{[B]}
"The Horn" †	Justin Hawkins; Dan Hawkins	"The Horn"	2013		
"Hot on My Tail"	Justin Hawkins; Dan Hawkins; Frankie Poullain; Rufus Tiger Taylor ‡	Dreams on Toast	2025		
"How Dare You Call This Love?"	Justin Hawkins; Dan Hawkins; Frankie Poullain; Ed Graham ‡	"Growing on Me"	2003		
"I Am Santa" †	Justin Hawkins; Dan Hawkins; Frankie Poullain; Rufus Tiger Taylor ‡	Last of Our Kind	2015		^{[D]}
"I Believe in a Thing Called Love" †	Justin Hawkins; Dan Hawkins; Frankie Poullain; Ed Graham ‡	Permission to Land	2003		^{[B]}^{[F]}
"I Hate Myself"	Justin Hawkins; Darby Todd; Derek Nash; Jem Godfrey; Lee Pomeroy; Jakob Herrmann	Dreams on Toast	2025		
"I Can't Believe It's Not Love"	Justin Hawkins; Dan Hawkins	Hot Cakes	2012		^{[C]}
"I Love You 5 Times"	Justin Hawkins; Dan Hawkins; Frankie Poullain; Ed Graham ‡	"Christmas Time (Don't Let the Bells End)"	2003		
"Is It Just Me?" †	Justin Hawkins; Dan Hawkins; Frankie Poullain	One Way Ticket to Hell... and Back	2005		^{[B]}
"I Wish I Was in Heaven"	Justin Hawkins; Dan Hawkins; Frankie Poullain; Rufus Tiger Taylor ‡	Pinewood Smile	2017		
"Japanese Prisoner of Love"	Justin Hawkins; Dan Hawkins; Frankie Poullain; Rufus Tiger Taylor ‡	Pinewood Smile	2017		
"Keep Me Hangin' On"	Justin Hawkins; Dan Hawkins	Hot Cakes	2012		
"Knockers"	Justin Hawkins; Dan Hawkins; Frankie Poullain	One Way Ticket to Hell... and Back	2005		^{[B]}
"Last of Our Kind"	Justin Hawkins; Dan Hawkins; Frankie Poullain	Last of Our Kind	2015		
"Lay Down With Me, Barbara"	Justin Hawkins; Dan Hawkins; Frankie Poullain; Rufus Tiger Taylor ‡	Pinewood Smile	2017		
"Living Each Day Blind"	Justin Hawkins; Dan Hawkins	Hot Cakes	2012		
"The Longest Kiss"	Justin Hawkins; Dan Hawkins; Frankie Poullain; Rufus Tiger Taylor ‡	Dreams on Toast	2025		
"Love Is Not the Answer"	Justin Hawkins; Dan Hawkins	Hot Cakes	2012		
"Love Is Only a Feeling" †	Justin Hawkins; Dan Hawkins; Frankie Poullain; Ed Graham ‡	Permission to Land	2003		^{[B]}^{[F]}
"Love on the Rocks with No Ice"	Justin Hawkins; Dan Hawkins; Frankie Poullain; Ed Graham ‡	Permission to Land	2003		^{[B]}^{[F]}
"Makin' Out"	Justin Hawkins; Dan Hawkins; Frankie Poullain; Ed Graham ‡	"I Believe in a Thing Called Love"	2003		^{[G]}
"Messenger"	Justin Hawkins; Dan Hawkins; Frankie Poullain	Last of Our Kind	2015		^{[A]}
"Mighty Wings"	Justin Hawkins; Dan Hawkins; Frankie Poullain	Last of Our Kind	2015		
"Million Dollar Strong"	Justin Hawkins; Dan Hawkins; Frankie Poullain	Last of Our Kind	2015		^{[A]}
"Mortal Dread"	Justin Hawkins; Dan Hawkins; Frankie Poullain; Rufus Tiger Taylor ‡	Dreams on Toast	2025		
"Mudslide"	Justin Hawkins; Dan Hawkins; Frankie Poullain; Emily Dolan-Davies ‡	Last of Our Kind	2015		
"Nothin's Gonna Stop Us"	Justin Hawkins; Dan Hawkins; Chris McDougall	Hot Cakes	2012		
"One Way Ticket" †	Justin Hawkins; Dan Hawkins; Frankie Poullain	One Way Ticket to Hell... and Back	2005		^{[B]}
"Open Fire" †	Justin Hawkins; Dan Hawkins; Frankie Poullain	Last of Our Kind	2015		
"Out of My Hands"	Justin Hawkins; Dan Hawkins; Frankie Poullain; Ed Graham ‡	"I Believe in a Thing Called Love"	2003		
"Pat Pong Ladies"	Justin Hawkins; Dan Hawkins; Frankie Poullain	Hot Cakes	2012		^{[C]}
"Physical Sex"	Justin Hawkins; Dan Hawkins; Frankie Poullain; Ed Graham ‡	"I Believe in a Thing Called Love"	2003		
"Planning Permission"	Justin Hawkins; Dan Hawkins; Frankie Poullain; Ed Graham ‡	"Love Is Only a Feeling"	2004		
"Rack of Glam"	Justin Hawkins; Dan Hawkins; Frankie Poullain; Rufus Tiger Taylor ‡	Pinewood Smile	2017		
"Roaring Waters"	Justin Hawkins; Dan Hawkins; Frankie Poullain	Last of Our Kind	2015		
"Rock and Roll Deserves to Die"	Justin Hawkins; Dan Hawkins; Frankie Poullain; Rufus Tiger Taylor ‡	Easter Is Cancelled	2019		
"Rock and Roll Party Cowboy"	Justin Hawkins; Dan Hawkins; Frankie Poullain; Rufus Tiger Taylor ‡	Dreams on Toast	2025		
"Rock in Space"	Justin Hawkins; Dan Hawkins; Frankie Poullain; Rufus Tiger Taylor ‡	Pinewood Smile	2017		
"Stampede of Love"	Justin Hawkins; Dan Hawkins; Frankie Poullain; Rufus Tiger Taylor ‡	Pinewood Smile	2017		
"Sarah O'Sarah"	Justin Hawkins; Dan Hawkins; Frankie Poullain	Last of Our Kind	2015		
"Seagulls (Losing My Virginity)"	Justin Hawkins; Dan Hawkins; Frankie Poullain; Rufus Tiger Taylor ‡	Pinewood Smile	2017		
"Seemed Like a Good Idea at the Time"	Justin Hawkins; Dan Hawkins; Frankie Poullain	One Way Ticket to Hell... and Back	2005		^{[B]}
"Shake (Like a Lettuce Leaf)"	Justin Hawkins; Dan Hawkins	"Is It Just Me?"	2006		
"She Just a Girl, Eddie"	Justin Hawkins; Dan Hawkins	Hot Cakes	2012		
"Shit Ghost"	Justin Hawkins; Dan Hawkins	"Is It Just Me?"	2006		
"Solid Gold" †	Justin Hawkins; Dan Hawkins; Frankie Poullain; Rufus Tiger Taylor‡	Pinewood Smile	2017		
"Southern Trains" †	Justin Hawkins; Dan Hawkins; Frankie Poullain; Rufus Tiger Taylor ‡	Pinewood Smile	2017		
"Stampede of Love"	Justin Hawkins; Dan Hawkins; Frankie Poullain; Rufus Tiger Taylor ‡	Pinewood Smile	2017		
"Street Spirit (Fade Out)"	Thom Yorke; Jonny Greenwood; Ed O'Brien; Colin Greenwood; Phil Selway	Hot Cakes	2012		
"Stuck in a Rut"	Justin Hawkins; Dan Hawkins; Frankie Poullain; Ed Graham ‡	Permission to Land	2003		^{[B]}
"Uniball"	Justin Hawkins; Dan Hawkins; Frankie Poullain; Rufus Tiger Taylor ‡	Pinewood Smile	2017		
"Walking Through Fire"	Justin Hawkins; Dan Hawkins; Frankie Poullain; Rufus Tiger Taylor ‡	Dreams on Toast	2025		
"Wanker"	Justin Hawkins; Dan Hawkins	"One Way Ticket"	2005		
"Weekend in Rome"	Justin Hawkins; Dan Hawkins; Frankie Poullain; Rufus Tiger Taylor; Charlie Smith ‡	Dreams on Toast	2025		
"Wheels of the Machine"	Justin Hawkins; Dan Hawkins; Frankie Poullain	Last of Our Kind	2015		
"Why Don't the Beautiful Cry?"	Justin Hawkins; Dan Hawkins; Frankie Poullain; Rufus Tiger Taylor ‡	Pinewood Smile	2017		
"With a Woman"	Justin Hawkins; Dan Hawkins; Frankie Poullain	Hot Cakes	2012		

== Notes ==
A. ^{a} ^{b} ^{c} ^{d} Featured on special deluxe editions of Last of Our Kind only.
B. ^{a} ^{b} ^{c} ^{d} ^{e} ^{f} ^{g} ^{h} ^{i} ^{j} ^{k} ^{l} ^{m} ^{n} ^{o} ^{p} ^{q} ^{r} ^{s} ^{t} ^{u} Also featured on the 2008 compilation album The Platinum Collection.
C. ^{a} ^{b} ^{c} Featured on special deluxe editions of Hot Cakes only.
D. ^{a} Featured on the Christmas reissue of Permission to Land only.
E. ^{a} Also featured on special deluxe editions of One Way Ticket to Hell... and Back.
F. ^{a} ^{b} ^{c} Originally featured on the 2002 extended play I Believe in a Thing Called Love.
G. ^{a} ^{b} Also featured on special deluxe editions of Permission to Land.
