= Live at Hammersmith (The Darkness album) =

Live album by The Darkness
- Released: 15 June 2018
- Recorded: 10 December 2017
- Venue: Hammersmith Odeon, Hammersmith, London
- Genre: Hard rock; glam rock
- Length: 75:50
- Label: Canary Dwarf; Cooking Vinyl

The Darkness chronology
Pinewood Smile (2017)	Live at Hammersmith (2018)	Easter Is Cancelled (2019)

Live at Hammersmith is a live album by the British hard rock band The Darkness. The album was released on 15 June 2018 and is the first live album the band has released.

== Background ==
The album and the track listing was announced on 25 April 2018. The album is a live recording of the full setlist from the band's performance at the Hammersmith Odeon in London in December 2017, with mastering done by band member Dan Hawkins. People who pre-ordered the album instantly received the promo-singles ‘Buccaneers of Hispaniola’ and 'I Believe in a Thing Called Love'. It was released on 15 June later that year on CD, Vinyl and Cassette.

== Track listing ==
Track listing taken from Spotify

No.	Title	Length
1.	"Open Fire"	4:02
2.	"Love is Only a Feeling"	4:16
3.	"Southern Trains"	3:23
4.	"Black Shuck"	3:50
5.	"One Way Ticket"	4:32
6.	"Givin' Up"	3:43
7.	"All the Pretty Girls"	3:16
8.	"Barbarian"	4:18
9.	"Buccaneers of Hispaniola"	4:02
10.	"Friday Night"	2:58
11.	"Makin' Out"	3:38
12.	"Every Inch of You"	3:19
13.	"Solid Gold"	4:39
14.	"Stuck in a Rut"	4:32
15.	"Get Your Hands off My Woman"	3:45
16.	"Growing on Me"	3:56
17.	"Japanese Prisoner of Love"	4:32
18.	"Christmas Time (Don't Let the Bells End)"	4:51
19.	"I Believe in a Thing Called Love"	4:18
Total length:		75:50

== Personnel ==
- Justin Hawkins – lead vocals, guitars, piano
- Dan Hawkins – guitars, backing vocals
- Frankie Poullain – bass, backing vocals
- Rufus Tiger Taylor – drums, backing vocals
