= I Believe in a Thing Called Love (EP) =

EP by The Darkness
- Released: 12 August 2002
- Genre: Hard rock, glam rock
- Label: Must Destroy

The Darkness chronology
I Believe in a Thing Called Love (2002)	Permission to Land (2003)

Professional ratings
Review scores
Source	Rating
AllMusic	link

I Believe in a Thing Called Love is the debut extended play (EP) by English rock band The Darkness. Released on 12 August 2002 by Must Destroy, the EP features three tracks which would later appear on the band's debut full-length album Permission to Land in 2003, including UK top-ten singles "I Believe in a Thing Called Love" and "Love Is Only a Feeling".

== Track listing ==
All tracks written and composed by Justin Hawkins, Dan Hawkins, Frankie Poullain and Ed Graham.

1. "I Believe in a Thing Called Love"
2. "Love on the Rocks with No Ice"
3. "Love Is Only a Feeling"

== Personnel ==
- Justin Hawkins – lead vocals, guitars, synth
- Dan Hawkins – guitars
- Frankie Poullain – bass
- Ed Graham – drums
