= Hot Cakes =

Studio album by the Darkness
- Released: 20 August 2012
- Recorded: 2011–2012
- Genres: Hard rock, glam metal
- Length: 40:39
- Labels: Canary Dwarf, Play It Again Sam, Wind-up
- Producers: Justin Hawkins, Dan Hawkins, Nick Brine

The Darkness chronology
One Way Ticket to Hell... and Back (2005)	Hot Cakes (2012)	Last of Our Kind (2015)

Singles from Hot Cakes
- 1. "Nothing's Gonna Stop Us" Released: 1 February 2012; 2. "Every Inch of You" Released: 25 May 2012; 3. "Everybody Have a Good Time" Released: 26 June 2012; 4. "With a Woman" Released: 2013; 5. "The Horn" Released: 25 November 2013

Hot Cakes is the third studio album by British rock band the Darkness, released on 20 August 2012 on Canary Dwarf Records. Produced by Nick Brine and band members Justin and Dan Hawkins, the album is the band's first since their 2011 reunion, and the first to feature founding bassist Frankie Poullain since Permission to Land in 2003. It is also the last album to feature all four original members, after Ed Graham's departure in 2014. Despite not being released until 20 August, the album was made available to stream on the Rolling Stone website on 14 August.

== Background ==
In 2011, the Darkness reunited following a five-year break-up, with Poullain returning to the band, replacing his successor, Richie Edwards. Regarding the band's reunion, drummer Ed Graham stated:

I heard a rumour that Dan and Justin [Hawkins] were actually writing songs together again and, having not spoken to them for ages, I emailed them. Basically I presumed that they were going to reform but I didn't really know that I was going to be in it. Then Dan, one day, was in London and he said, "Ed, I'd like to meet with you" and we just had a drink and he said, "we've been writing songs together for months and we've just finally got to a stage of where we really want the original four people, so are you interested?" Which was obviously great.

== Composition ==
The majority of the album was recorded at guitarist Dan Hawkins's home, Leeders Farm, in Norfolk. Discussing the album in comparison to the band's previous two studio albums, Permission to Land and One Way Ticket to Hell... and Back, drummer Ed Graham noted: "I think that we all feel that the second Darkness album is a bit over produced and maybe lost its way in places, a bit. I think we wanted to return to the form we were in; we wanted to make something that was more like Permission to Land than the second album. There are a couple of songs on this new album that are actually really old songs that we played ten years ago when we first formed."

The track "She Just a Girl, Eddie" was written about Graham's ex-girlfriend. Prior the album's release, Graham noted: "Justin's written a song about my ex-girlfriend which is slightly embarrassing. He wrote a song called 'She Just a Girl Eddie' and it's very obviously about the split up with my ex. It doesn't mention her name but I enjoy playing that. It's a good song. I'm not speaking to her so I don't know if she's heard it or not. I'm not sure how she'd feel about it." Justin Hawkins said, "Hot Cakes has a nice raw feel to it like the first album had, with occasional luxurious moments akin to the second. We're proud of the songs and we can't wait for people to hear them. We've been playing a lot of the material from the album in the live set for some time now. Each time we play a new song it feels like a deep powerful thrust in a frenzied love ritual between us and our fans."

The album includes a cover of the 1996 Radiohead song "Street Spirit (Fade Out)", a staple of the Darkness's live shows. Hawkins said "we wanted to release a definitive recording of our interpretation". It incorporates "speed-metal verses with half-time power-grunge choruses".

== Reception ==
Professional ratings
Aggregate scores
Source	Rating
Metacritic	67/100
Review scores
Source	Rating
AllMusic	4/5 stars
The A.V. Club	D+
The Guardian	4/5 stars
The Independent	5/5 stars
Mojo	4/5 stars
NME	7/10
Pitchfork	5.2/10
PopMatters	3/10
Rolling Stone	3/5 stars
Uncut	7/10

Hot Cakes received generally positive reviews from critics. According to the website Metacritic, which assigns a weighted mean rating out of 100 to reviews from mainstream critics, the album received an average review score of 67/100, based on 24 reviews, which indicates "generally favorable reviews".

Allmusic's Matt Collar wrote a positive review, noting: "Perhaps nobody expected the band to ever match the giddy, karate-kick high of Permission to Land, but the group's comeback album, Hot Cakes, is definitely worthy of throwing more than a few devil horns the band's way." NME magazine stated: "Nothing has changed, except the world's perception of them. Now they are sober, and not in everyone's face all the time, so we can all take them in the good-natured, fun spirit in which they were always intended." The Guardian praised the band's comeback, stating: "If the first chapter of The Darkness' career was book-ended by glittering rise and ignominious disintegration, their return has been a more understated and purposeful affair. [...] Hot Cakes bulges with infectious melodies, blazing leads and strident riffing, Justin Hawkins' unmistakable falsetto adding pathos and silliness in equal measure." Rolling Stone's Chuck Eddy noted: "Hot Cakes stays amusing, mixing beer-barrel chuggers with proud schlock ballads." The A.V. Club's Jason Heller gave the album a negative review, stating: "Hot Cakes marks the point where The Darkness has stopped cannibalizing the golden age of stadium rock and simply started cannibalizing itself. And, despite Hawkins' inveterate crotch-grabbing, there was never that much meat there to begin with."

== Track listing ==
All tracks are written by Justin Hawkins and Dan Hawkins, except where noted.

No.	Title	Writer(s)	Length
1.	"Every Inch of You"		3:04
2.	"Nothing's Gonna Stop Us"	J. Hawkins, D. Hawkins, Chris McDougall	2:45
3.	"With a Woman"	J. Hawkins, D. Hawkins, Frankie Poullain	3:41
4.	"Keep Me Hangin' On"		3:00
5.	"Living Each Day Blind"		5:06
6.	"Everybody Have a Good Time"		4:48
7.	"She Just a Girl, Eddie"		3:46
8.	"Forbidden Love"	J. Hawkins, D. Hawkins, Poullain	3:49
9.	"Concrete"	J. Hawkins, D. Hawkins, Poullain	3:52
10.	"Street Spirit (Fade Out)" (Radiohead cover)	Thom Yorke, Jonny Greenwood, Ed O'Brien, Colin Greenwood, Phil Selway	3:07
11.	"Love Is Not the Answer"		3:41

Deluxe edition bonus tracks
No.	Title	Writer(s)	Length
12.	"I Can't Believe It's Not Love" (acoustic demo)		3:43
13.	"Love Is Not the Answer" (acoustic demo)		3:46
14.	"Pat Pong Ladies" (demo mix)	J. Hawkins, D. Hawkins, Poullain	3:58
15.	"Cannonball" (long version) (featuring Ian Anderson)	J. Hawkins, D. Hawkins, Poullain	4:20

Digital deluxe edition bonus material
No.	Title	Length
16.	"Nothing's Gonna Stop Us" (music video)	3:02
17.	"Everybody Have a Good Time" (music video)	5:57

Extra Hot Cakes Yuletide Edition bonus tracks
No.	Title	Length
16.	"The Horn"	2:53
17.	"Christmas Time (Don't Let the Bells End)"	3:29
18.	"Every Inch of You" (Live)	3:19
19.	"Black Shuck" (Live)	3:31
20.	"Get Your Hands off My Woman" (Live)	3:46
21.	"Everybody Have a Good Time" (Live)	4:23
22.	"Planning Permission" (Live)	3:02
23.	"With a Woman" (Live)	3:41
24.	"One Way Ticket" (Live)	4:13
25.	"Growing on Me" (Live)	3:34
26.	"I Believe in a Thing Called Love" (Live)	4:10

== Personnel ==
The following people contributed to Hot Cakes:

=== The Darkness ===
- Justin Hawkins – vocals, guitars
- Dan Hawkins – guitars
- Frankie Poullain – bass guitar
- Ed Graham – drums

=== Additional musicians ===
- Ian Anderson – flute ("Cannonball")

=== Recording personnel ===
- Nick Brine – producer, engineer
- Justin Hawkins – producer
- Dan Hawkins – producer
- Bob Ezrin – mixing, producer (1)
- Justin Courtelyou – mixing engineer
- Joshua Tyrell – recording assistant
- Owen Morgan – recording assistant
- Greg Calbi – mastering

=== Artwork ===
- Diego Gravinese – sleeve art, original photograph, digital work, oil painting on canvas
- Thom Lessner – art direction, concept
- Rob Chenery at Tourist, London – design, art direction

== Chart performance ==
Chart (2012–13)	Peak position
Australian ARIA Albums Chart	15
Austrian Albums Chart	24
Belgian Albums Chart (Flanders)	124
Belgian Albums Chart (Wallonia)	67
Dutch Albums Chart	94
French Albums Chart	107
German Albums Chart	16
Irish Albums Chart	14
Italian Albums Chart	15
Japanese Albums Chart	15
Spanish Albums Chart	51
Swedish Albums Chart	30
Swiss Albums Chart	20
UK Albums Chart	4
UK Rock Chart	1
US Billboard 200	43
US Billboard Hard Rock Albums Chart	2
US Billboard Rock Albums Chart	12
