= Motorheart =

Studio album by The Darkness
- Released: 19 November 2021
- Studio: Hawkland Studios, Sussex
- Genre: Hard rock; glam rock
- Length: 35:21
- Label: Canary Dwarf; Cooking Vinyl
- Producer: Dan Hawkins; Ian Holland; Andy Shillito

The Darkness chronology
Easter Is Cancelled (2019)	Motorheart (2021)	Dreams on Toast (2025)

Motorheart is the seventh studio album by the British hard rock band The Darkness. It was released on 19 November 2021 through Cooking Vinyl.

== Background ==
On 4 June 2021, the band announced they were set to release the new album Motorheart in October. The album was eventually released on 19 November 2021. The album's cover was also unveiled in the announcement. The first single, "Motorheart", was released in August 2021. Along with the album release, the band announced an extensive list of UK tour dates to take place throughout November and December in support of the release of the album.

== Critical reception ==
Professional ratings
Aggregate scores
Source	Rating
Metacritic	70/100
Review scores
Source	Rating
AllMusic	3/5 stars
Classic Rock	3.5/5 stars
Exclaim!	8/10
Kerrang!	3/5 stars
PopMatters	8/10

The album received generally favourable reception, with a score of 70 out of 100 on review aggregator Metacritic from five critics' reviews.

== Track listing ==
1. "Welcome Tae Glasgae" – 2:49
2. "It's Love, Jim" – 3:23
3. "Motorheart" – 4:59
4. "The Power and the Glory of Love" – 3:58
5. "Jussy's Girl" – 4:09
6. "Sticky Situations" – 4:18
7. "Nobody Can See Me Cry" – 3:16
8. "Eastbound" – 3:36
9. "Speed of the Nite Time" – 4:52

Deluxe edition bonus tracks

10. "You Don't Have to Be Crazy About Me... But It Helps" – 3:33
11. "It's a Love Thang (You Wouldn't Understand)" – 3:18
12. "So Long" – 3:08

Japanese edition bonus track

13. "The Age of Darkness" – 4:56

== Personnel ==
The Darkness

- Justin Hawkins – vocals, lead guitar, synthesisers
- Dan Hawkins – guitar, backing vocals
- Frankie Poullain – bass, backing vocals
- Rufus Tiger Taylor – drums, backing vocals

Additional personnel

- Diane Birch – synthesisers, keyboards and backing vocals on "Speed of the Nite Time"
- Olga Hübner – strings and string arrangements on "Sticky Situations"
- Ralf Hübner – strings on "Sticky Situations"
- Mimi Norfolk – backing vocals on "Jussy's Girl"

Production

- Dan Hawkins – producer, engineer, mixing
- Ian Holland – additional production and engineering
- Andy Shillito – additional production and engineering
- Chiara Mazzoni – artwork
- Simon Emmett – band photo
- Luke Insect – design

== Charts ==
Chart performance for Motorheart
Chart (2021)	Peak position
Australian Albums (ARIA)	96
Scottish Albums (OCC)	15
Swiss Albums (Schweizer Hitparade)	99
UK Albums (OCC)	16
UK Rock & Metal Albums (OCC)	1
