= Last of Our Kind =

Studio album by The Darkness
- Released: 27 May 2015
- Recorded: 2014–2015
- Studio: The Hawks Nest (Norfolk)
- Genre: Hard rock; glam rock; glam metal
- Length: 41:27
- Label: Canary Dwarf
- Producer: Dan Hawkins

The Darkness chronology
Hot Cakes (2012)	Last of Our Kind (2015)	Pinewood Smile (2017)

Singles from Last of Our Kind
- 1. "Barbarian" Released: 8 March 2015; 2. "Open Fire" Released: 25 May 2015; 3. "Last of Our Kind" Released: 29 July 2015; 4. "Million Dollar Strong" Released: 30 October 2015; 5. "I Am Santa" Released: 19 November 2015

Alternate cover
- Deluxe edition cover

Last of Our Kind is the fourth studio album by British hard rock band The Darkness. Produced by the band's guitarist Dan Hawkins at his studio The Hawks Nest in Norfolk, it was first released on 27 May 2015 in Japan, and later in other territories, by Canary Dwarf Records. The album is the first and only by the band to feature drummer Emily Dolan Davies, who replaced Ed Graham in 2014 before leaving less than a year later. The album also features Frankie Poullain on lead vocals for the first time on the final track Conquerors.

The album was promoted via PledgeMusic, with the band offering signed copies of the album on both CD and vinyl, as well as signed guitars, handwritten lyric sheets and setlists from the band's archive.

== Recording and production ==
Last of Our Kind was entirely written in Ireland, then produced by guitarist Dan Hawkins at his own recording studio at Leeders Farm, in Norfolk. Around fifteen songs were in contention for the final track listing; ten appear on the standard release, with the Japanese and Best Buy releases containing two exclusive bonus tracks, while another – "Million Dollar Strong" – was played live during their warm-up tour of Ireland in March 2015.

Reflecting on the album in 2025, bass guitarist Frankie Poullain noted: "We managed [our 2011] comeback really badly, and Hot Cakes wasn’t our best album either. With Last of Our Kind there was just a feeling of defiance, a lot of emotion on that. We showed people who we are just by sticking in there."

== Release and promotion ==
The first song revealed from the album was Barbarian, which was released on 23 February at the same time as the album's official announcement. "Barbarian" was released as the first promotional single on 8 March 2015. A PledgeMusic page was set up to promote the album before release. The release of Last of Our Kind was preceded by a tour of Ireland in March 2015. The second promotional single from the album, "Open Fire", premiered on 23 March, followed by an official chart release on 25 May 2015. Following the departure of Emily Dolan Davies from the band, The Darkness performed live for the first time with current drummer Rufus Taylor, the son of Queen's Roger Taylor, at an album launch party, hosted for fans at London's Gibson Guitar Studio on April 23. A third single, "Last of Our Kind", was released on 29 July, accompanied by an in-studio promotional video, which features the band alongside a select number of fans. The album was re-released on 20 November 2015, with alternative, Christmas-themed cover and four bonus tracks including the singles "Million Dollar Strong" and "I Am Santa".

A special edition of the album was also released in November 2015, containing four bonus tracks.

== Critical reception ==
Journalist J.C. Maçek III of Spectrum Culture wrote "This fourth album was produced by guitarist Dan Hawkins who proves to be a genius with this style of music, especially when evoking the most primal wails of his brother, vocalist Justin Hawkins."

Professional ratings
Aggregate scores
Source	Rating
Metacritic	63/100
Review scores
Source	Rating
AllMusic	4/5 stars
Classic Rock	4/5 stars
Consequence of Sound	B−
Drowned in Sound	7/10
Kerrang!	4/5 stars
Mojo	3/5 stars
Q	3/5 stars
Sputnikmusic	3.5/5
Uncut	3.5/5 stars
Under the Radar	5.5/10

== Music and lyrics ==
Frontman Justin Hawkins has described the album as "brutal", adding that "It's definitely stripped back with the exception of some mandolins. But when you're doing medieval rock, you should have a mandolin on it ... It's medieval rock, but it still sounds like The Darkness. It's medi-urban, I suppose". Explaining the meaning of the lyrics more deeply, the singer has noted that they "describe the Viking invasion of East Anglia which culminated in the decapitation of Edmund the Martyr", describing the thematic basis as "classic Darkness".

== Track listing ==
All songs written and composed by Justin Hawkins, Dan Hawkins and Frankie Poullain; "Mudslide" and "Messenger" co-written by Emily Dolan Davies, "I Am Santa" co-written by Rufus Taylor.

No.	Title	Length
1.	"Barbarian"	3:34
2.	"Open Fire"	4:01
3.	"Last of Our Kind"	4:09
4.	"Roaring Waters"	4:38
5.	"Wheels of the Machine"	3:07
6.	"Mighty Wings"	5:46
7.	"Mudslide"	3:25
8.	"Sarah O'Sarah"	3:52
9.	"Hammer & Tongs"	4:02
10.	"Conquerors"	4:55

Last of Our Kind — Deluxe edition
No.	Title	Length
11.	"Messenger"	3:50
12.	"Always Had the Blues"	5:11
13.	"Million Dollar Strong"	3:09
14.	"I Am Santa"	4:24

Last of Our Kind — Japanese and Best Buy edition
No.	Title	Length
11.	"Messenger"	3:50
12.	"Always Had the Blues"	5:11

Last of Our Kind — Out-takes
No.	Title	Length
13.	"Million Dollar Strong"	2:58

== Personnel ==
Personnel per Last of Our Kind liner notes. The Darkness

- Justin Hawkins – vocals, lead guitar, synth
- Dan Hawkins – guitar, backing vocals, percussion, mandolin, production
- Frankie Poullain – bass, backing vocals, cowbell, lead vocal ("Conquerors")
- Emily Dolan Davies – drums, backing vocals

Additional musicians

- Rufus Tiger Taylor – drums ("I Am Santa")
- Trevor Weston – monologue ("Barbarian")
- 236 The Darkness Fans – vocals ("Last of Our Kind")

Artwork

- Phillis Darkling – art direction, design
- Nick Roche – artwork (front cover)
- Christian Furr – artwork (rear cover)
- Thom Lessner – artwork (illustrations)
- Kevin Smith – online design
- Simon Emmett – photography

== Charts ==
Chart (2015)	Peak position
Australian Albums (ARIA)	23
Austrian Albums (Ö3 Austria)	53
German Albums (Offizielle Top 100)	56
Irish Albums (IRMA)	49
Italian Albums (FIMI)	36
Scottish Albums (OCC)	12
Swiss Albums (Schweizer Hitparade)	43
UK Albums (OCC)	12
UK Rock & Metal Albums (OCC)	1
UK Independent Charts (OCC)	2
UK Vinyl Chart (OCC)	4
US Billboard 200	125
US Top Rock Albums (Billboard)	13
US Top Hard Rock Albums (Billboard)	2
