= Dreams on Toast =

Studio album by The Darkness
- Released: 28 March 2025
- Recorded: 2024
- Studio: Hawkland Studios, Suffolk
- Genre: Hard rock
- Length: 33:05
- Label: Cooking Vinyl; Canary Dwarf
- Producer: Dan Hawkins

The Darkness chronology
Motorheart (2021)	Dreams on Toast (2025)

Singles from Dreams on Toast
- 1. "The Longest Kiss" Released: 18 September 2024; 2. "I Hate Myself" Released: 10 December 2024; 3. "Rock and Roll Party Cowboy" Released: 24 January 2025; 4. "Walking Through Fire" Released: 24 February 2025; 5. "The Battle for Gadget Land" Released: 10 March 2025; 6. "Hot on My Tail" Released: 24 March 2025

Dreams on Toast is the eighth studio album by the British hard rock band the Darkness, released on 28 March 2025 on Canary Dwarf and Cooking Vinyl. Produced by guitarist Dan Hawkins, the album was preceded by the singles, "The Longest Kiss", "I Hate Myself", "Rock and Roll Party Cowboy", "Walking Through Fire", "The Battle for Gadget Land" and "Hot on My Tail".

Released to positive reviews, the album debuted at number two on both the UK Albums Chart and Scottish Albums Chart, and number one on the UK Independent Albums Chart, becoming their highest charting album in the UK since Permission to Land (2003).

== Writing and composition ==
The album's opening track, "Rock and Roll Party Cowboy", is a satire on rock and roll cliches, with frontman Justin Hawkins noting, "It's got that gay undercurrent. Rock can be so straight and misogynistic, it drives me mad. I wanted to subvert those tropes." The album's fourth track, "Mortal Dread", addresses the passage of time and changing cultural values: "The world's changing. The perceptions of what's toxic, the things you were taught to be when you were younger are now unacceptable, you're losing your raison d'être. You get to my age and you go, 'If I'm not a man, what am I?'"

The album's penultimate track, "Walking Through Fire", directly addresses the band's current position within the music industry, with Justin Hawkins noting, "I think ambition is a little bit ugly. When you lay stuff bare like that and you talk about the experience of doing things, that’s nearly as interesting as the music itself. If anyone is inclined to pay attention to the lyrics, they’re getting an experience of what this existence looks like and feels like."

During the writing process, the band wrote roughly 150 songs in contention for the album.

== Release ==
On 18 September 2024, the band announced they were set to release the new album Dreams on Toast in March. The album was released on 28 March 2025. Along with the announcement, the band announced an extensive list of UK tour dates which took place from 6 March to 1 April 2025, in support of the release of the album. Additional dates were added to play songs from the album for the first time alongside dates in Ireland.

Six singles were released: "The Longest Kiss", "I Hate Myself", "Rock and Roll Party Cowboy", "Walking Through Fire", "The Battle for Gadget Land" and "Hot on My Tail".

== Critical reception ==
Professional ratings
Aggregate scores
Source	Rating
Metacritic	68/100
Review scores
Source	Rating
AllMusic	3.5/5 stars
Classic Rock	4/5 stars
Exclaim!	6/10
Kerrang!	4/5
Mojo	4/5 stars
musicOMH	3/5 stars
PopMatters	5/10

The album received generally favourable reviews by critics. At Metacritic, which assigns a normalised rating out of 100 to reviews from mainstream critics, the album earned an average score of 68, based on 9 reviews.

== Track listing ==
All tracks are written by Justin Hawkins, Dan Hawkins, Frankie Poullain and Rufus Tiger Taylor, except where noted.

Dreams on Toast track listing
No.	Title	Writer(s)	Length
1.	"Rock and Roll Party Cowboy"		4:27
2.	"I Hate Myself"	J. Hawkins; Darby Todd; Derek Nash; Jem Godfrey; Lee Pomeroy; Jakob Herrmann	3:15
3.	"Hot on My Tail"		3:23
4.	"Mortal Dread"		3:29
5.	"Don't Need Sunshine"		3:01
6.	"The Longest Kiss"		2:49
7.	"The Battle for Gadget Land"		3:32
8.	"Cold Hearted Woman"		3:10
9.	"Walking Through Fire"		2:54
10.	"Weekend in Rome"	J. Hawkins; D. Hawkins; Poullain; Taylor; Charlie Smith	3:03
Total length:			33:05

Bonus Tracks

Christmas edition bonus track
No.	Title	Writer(s)	Length
11.	"Mistletoe and Wine"	Jeremy Paul; Leslie Stewart; Keith Strachan	4:26

Justin-signed exclusive bonus track
No.	Title	Length
11.	"The Wishing Well"	2:35

Dan-signed exclusive bonus track
No.	Title	Length
11.	"Au Revoir, My Friend"	3:34

Frankie-signed exclusive bonus track
No.	Title	Length
11.	"Peppermint and Chamomile"	2:56

Rufus-signed exclusive bonus track
No.	Title	Length
11.	"My Only"	4:08

== Personnel ==
Personnel taken from the album's liner notes.

The Darkness

- Justin Hawkins – lead vocals, guitar, piano
- Dan Hawkins – guitar, backing vocals
- Frankie Poullain – bass, backing vocals
- Rufus Tiger Taylor – drums, backing vocals

Additional performers

- Ian "Softlad" Norfolk – ukelele, Mellotron (cello), acoustic guitar, mandolin, banjo
- Sweet Jane Pomplas – fiddle on "Cold Hearted Woman"
- Stephen Dorff – monologue on "Weekend In Rome"
- Charlie Smith – string arrangement on "Weekend In Rome"

Production

- Dan Hawkins – production, engineering, mixing
- Ian "Softlad" Norfolk – assistance
- Mike Marsh – mastering

Artwork

- Perry Shall – design, layout
- Simon Emmett – photos

== Charts ==
Chart performance for Dreams on Toast
Chart (2025)	Peak position
Australian Albums (ARIA)	45
Austrian Albums (Ö3 Austria)	37
Belgian Albums (Ultratop Flanders)	49
Belgian Albums (Ultratop Wallonia)	96
German Albums (Offizielle Top 100)	58
Irish Albums (IRMA)	89
Scottish Albums (Official Charts)	2
Spanish Albums (PROMUSICAE)	91
Swiss Albums (Schweizer Hitparade)	49
UK Albums (Official Charts)	2
UK Independent Albums (Official Charts)	1
UK Rock & Metal Albums (Official Charts)	1
