= Pinewood Smile =

Studio album by the Darkness
- Released: 6 October 2017
- Studio: Vada Studios (Worcestershire)
- Genres: Hard rock; glam rock
- Length: 36:16
- Labels: Canary Dwarf, Cooking Vinyl
- Producer: Adrian Bushby

The Darkness chronology
Last of Our Kind (2015)	Pinewood Smile (2017)	Live at Hammersmith (2018)

Singles from Pinewood Smile
- 1. "All The Pretty Girls" Released: 21 July 2017; 2. "Solid Gold" Released: 18 August 2017; 3. "Southern Trains" Released: 25 September 2017; 4. "Happiness" Released: 24 November 2017

Pinewood Smile is the fifth studio album released by British hard rock band the Darkness. Produced by Adrian Bushby, the album was released on 6 October 2017 and is the first album by the band to be released by Cooking Vinyl. It is also their full first album to feature Rufus Tiger Taylor on drums, after Emily Dolan Davies left the band in 2015.

== Background ==
Details of the album were first revealed in March 2017 on the band's Facebook page, and was estimated for released in late 2017. The album's title and more details were later revealed on 21 July 2017, with the album's title being revealed as Pinewood Smile and being given a release date of 6 October through Cooking Vinyl. The album was recorded entirely in Worcestershire in Vada Recording Studios and was produced by award-winning producer and engineer Adrian Bushby, who has worked with other rock bands such as Muse, Foo Fighters and Smashing Pumpkins. That same day, the first single from the album, "All the Pretty Girls", was released. Three other singles from the album—"Solid Gold" and "Southern Trains" were also pre-released from the album on 18 August and 25 September respectively with "Happiness" following the album's release on 24 November.

A live version of "Buccaneers of Hispaniola" was a pre-release single in April 2018 for the album Live at Hammersmith

== Critical reception ==
Pinewood Smile received generally positive reviews from music critics. At Metacritic, which assigns a weighted mean rating out of 100 to reviews from mainstream critics, the album received an average score of 71 based on 7 reviews. Kerrang! ranked the album as the 23rd best album of 2017 in their year-end list.

Professional ratings
Aggregate scores
Source	Rating
Metacritic	71/100
Review scores
Source	Rating
AllMusic	3/5 stars
Clash	6/10
Classic Rock	3/5 stars
Kerrang!	4/5 stars
Mojo	4/5 stars
Pitchfork	4.8/10
Q	4/5 stars
Sputnikmusic	2/5

== Track listing ==
All tracks are written by Dan Hawkins, Justin Hawkins, Frankie Poullain and Rufus Tiger Taylor.

No.	Title	Length
1.	"All the Pretty Girls"	3:18
2.	"Buccaneers of Hispaniola"	3:06
3.	"Solid Gold"	4:32
4.	"Southern Trains"	2:52
5.	"Why Don't the Beautiful Cry?"	3:36
6.	"Japanese Prisoner of Love"	4:19
7.	"Lay Down with Me, Barbara"	4:05
8.	"I Wish I Was in Heaven"	3:21
9.	"Happiness"	3:13
10.	"Stampede of Love"	3:54
Total length:		36:16

Deluxe edition bonus tracks
No.	Title	Length
11.	"Uniball"	3:33
12.	"Rack of Glam"	3:44
13.	"Seagulls (Losing My Virginity)"	3:54
14.	"Rock in Space"	3:33
Total length:		51:00

Japanese bonus track
No.	Title	Length
15.	"Why Don´t the Beautiful Cry (demo version)"	4:18

- The vinyl version omits the track "Happiness" due to space limitations.

== Personnel ==
=== The Darkness ===
- Justin Hawkins – vocals, lead guitar, piano
- Dan Hawkins – guitars, backing vocals
- Frankie Poullain – bass, backing vocals
- Rufus Tiger Taylor – drums, backing vocals

=== Production ===
- Adrian Bushby – mixer, producer
- George Perks – engineer
- Mike Marsh – mastering

== Charts ==
Chart (2017)	Peak position
Australian Albums (ARIA)	17
Scottish Albums (Official Charts)	8
Swiss Albums (Schweizer Hitparade)	90
UK Albums (Official Charts)	8
UK Rock & Metal Albums (Official Charts)	1
US Billboard 200	190
US Top Hard Rock Albums (Billboard)	10
US Top Rock Albums (Billboard)	37

=== Singles ===
Solid Gold peaked at number 5 on the Kerrang! Rock Chart in September 2017, while Southern Trains reached number 14 on the same chart in October of that year.
