= Everybody Have a Good Time =

"Everybody Have A Good Time"

Single by The Darkness

from the album Hot Cakes
- Released: 26 June 2012
- Recorded: 2012
- Genre: Hard rock, glam metal
- Length: 4:47
- Label: Wind-Up, Play It Again Sam Recordings
- Songwriters: Justin Hawkins, Dan Hawkins
- Producer: Mike Fraser

The Darkness singles chronology
"Nothing's Gonna Stop Us" (2012)	"Everybody Have A Good Time" (2012)	"Every Inch of You" (2012)

"Everybody Have A Good Time" is a song by the British rock band The Darkness, released as a single from their third studio album Hot Cakes in June 2012.

== Release and reception ==
Loudwire stated that the song "delivers a retro, rocking anthem bedazzled with big sing-a-long choruses and just enough guitar solos." Spin refers to the song as "giddy glam-rock blast, all Thin Lizzy bombast and T. Rex boogie." NME stated that the song "features the band's trademark 1970s rock sound, and a chorus strongly reminiscent of Queen." However, despite the strong critical praise, the public were not "buying it", with the song failing to chart anywhere in Europe. It was their only single to date not to chart in the UK Top 40.

== Music video ==
The Warren Fu-directed music video premiered two days after the official single release. Despite opening with the intertitle "Hot Cakes – Episode 2", this video was actually the third video to be released from the album, following "Nothing's Gonna Stop Us" and Every Inch of You.

== Track listing ==
- Digital download
1. "Everybody Have a Good Time" – 4:47
- Promotional CD single
1. "Everybody Have a Good Time" – 4:47
2. "Everybody Have a Good Time" (Radio Edit) – 3:45

== Chart performance ==
Chart (2012–2013)	Peak position	Ref
Canadian Active Rock Songs Chart	33	
