= Easter Is Cancelled =

Studio album by The Darkness
- Released: 4 October 2019
- Genres: Hard rock, glam metal
- Length: 38:50
- Labels: Canary Dwarf, Cooking Vinyl
- Producer: Dan Hawkins

The Darkness chronology
Live at Hammersmith (2018)	Easter Is Cancelled (2019)	Motorheart (2021)

Singles from Easter Is Cancelled
- 1. "Rock and Roll Deserves to Die" Released: 6 August 2019; 2. "Heart Explodes" Released: 16 August 2019; 3. "Easter Is Cancelled" Released: 26 September 2019

Easter Is Cancelled is the sixth studio album by the British hard rock band the Darkness. It was released on 4 October 2019 through Canary Dwarf and Cooking Vinyl.

== Background ==
The album was first announced on 4 April 2019, via a video published on the band's official YouTube channel, featuring the band members reciting a poem. A few days later they also announced details of a UK headline tour to support the album. The first single from the album, "Rock and Roll Deserves to Die", was released on 6 August 2019, along with an accompanying music video.

== Critical reception ==
Professional ratings
Aggregate scores
Source	Rating
Metacritic	69/100
Review scores
Source	Rating
AllMusic	3.5/5 stars
The Arts Desk	3/5 stars
Classic Rock	4/5 stars
Kerrang!	4/5 stars
Mojo	3/5 stars
PopMatters	7/10
Q	4/5 stars
Sputnikmusic	2.5/5
Uncut	5/10
Under the Radar	5.5/10

The album received generally favourable reviews.

== Track listing ==
1. "Rock and Roll Deserves to Die" – 5:23
2. "How Can I Lose Your Love" – 3:02
3. "Live 'Til I Die" – 3:32
4. "Heart Explodes" – 3:47
5. "Deck Chair" – 2:24
6. "Easter Is Cancelled" – 4:18
7. "Heavy Metal Lover" – 4:41
8. "In Another Life" – 4:01
9. "Choke on It" – 3:21
10. "We Are the Guitar Men" – 4:21

Deluxe edition bonus tracks

11. "Laylow" – 3:23
12. "Different Eyes" – 2:51
13. "Confirmation Bias" – 4:35
14. "Sutton Hoo" – 3:27

Japanese Edition bonus track

15. "Dancing House" – 1:05

== Personnel ==
The Darkness

- Justin Hawkins – vocals, guitars, piano
- Dan Hawkins – guitars, backing vocals
- Frankie Poullain – bass, backing vocals
- Rufus Tiger Taylor – drums, backing vocals

Additional musicians

- Andy Shillito – double bass and backing vocals on "Laylow"
- Mel Vallance – backing vocals on "Laylow", French monologue on "Deck Chair"
- Ian "Softlad" Norfolk – handclaps on "Laylow"

Production

- Dan Hawkins – production, engineering, mixing
- Ian "Softlad" Norfolk – assistance
- Adam Ayan – mastering

Artwork

- Chiara Mazzoni – illustrations
- Simon Emmett – photography

== Charts ==
Chart (2019)	Peak position
Australian Albums (ARIA)	22
French Albums (SNEP)	186
German Albums (Offizielle Top 100)	60
Irish Albums (IRMA)	31
Italian Albums (FIMI)	90
Spanish Albums (PROMUSICAE)	48
Swiss Albums (Schweizer Hitparade)	79
UK Albums (Official Charts)	10
UK Rock & Metal Albums (Official Charts)	1
