= Rufus Tiger Taylor =

British drummer (born 1991)

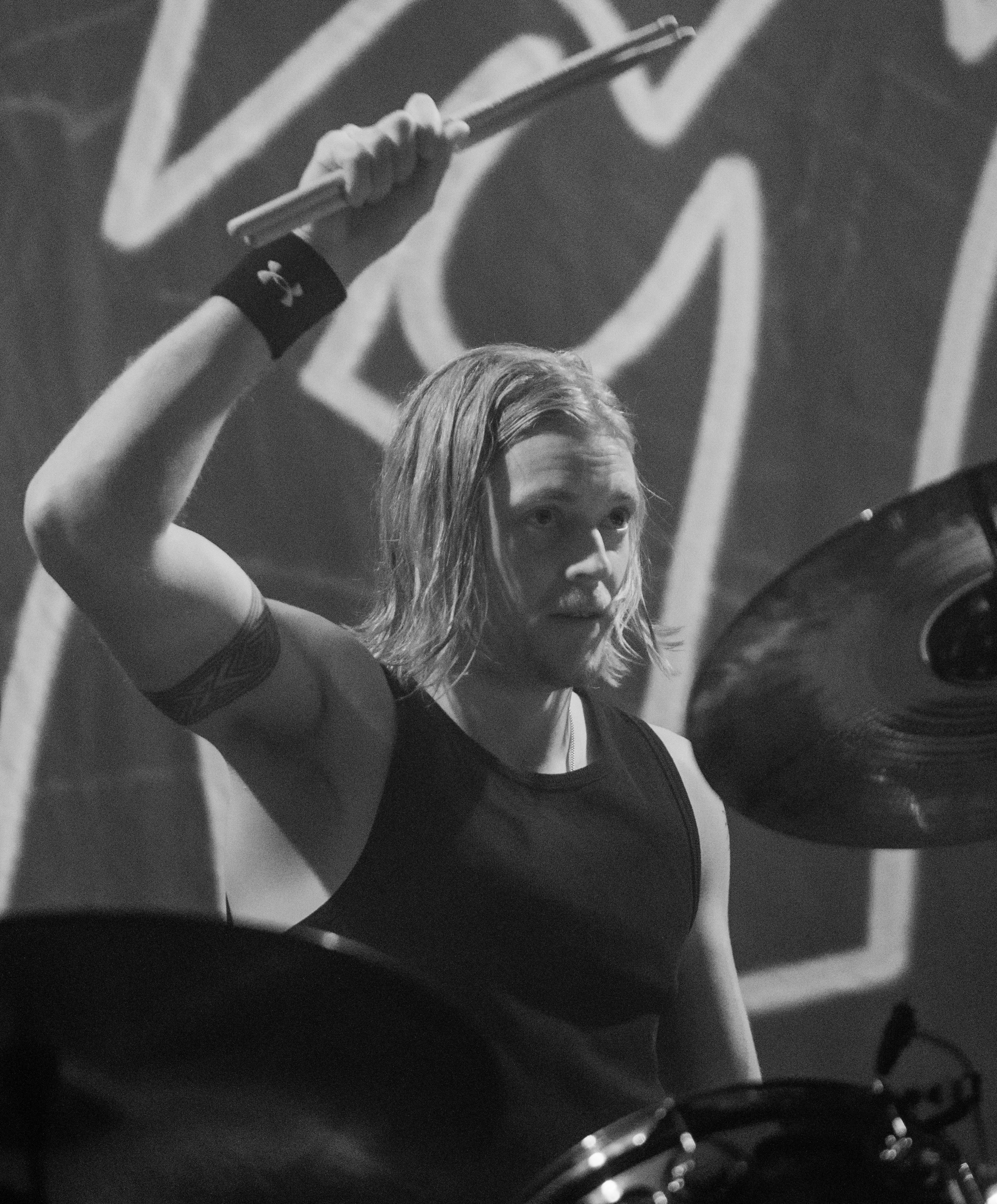
- Performing with the Darkness in 2025

Background information
- Born: 8 March 1991 (age 35); London, England
- Genres: Hard rock, glam metal, glam rock, heavy metal
- Occupation: Drummer
- Years active: 2008–present
- Father: Roger Taylor

Rufus Tiger Taylor (born 8 March 1991) is an English musician. He is best known as the drummer for the rock band the Darkness since May 2015, and as a touring drummer for the Queen + Adam Lambert stage shows. He is the son of Queen drummer Roger Taylor.

== Early life ==
Taylor was born on 8 March 1991 in London, to Queen drummer Roger Taylor and his longtime girlfriend Deborah Leng. According to his father, Rufus' middle name "Tiger" was chosen by Queen lead singer Freddie Mercury. Taylor claims that growing up with drums made him decide that he wanted to follow in his father's footsteps, as he was uninterested academically, leaving school at the age of 16 in favour of a ski instruction course with Warren Smith Ski Academy.

== Career ==
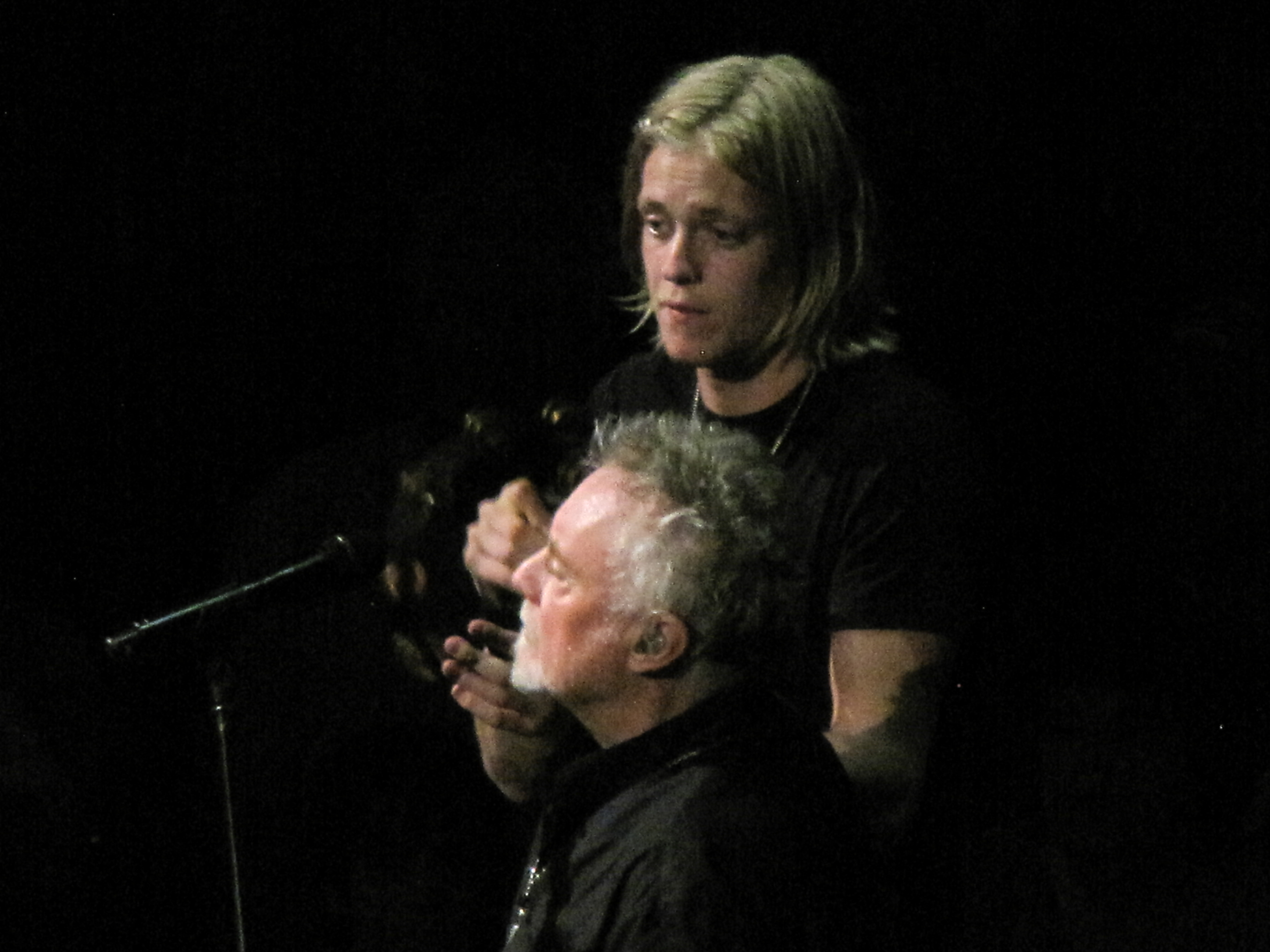
Rufus and Roger Taylor performing with Queen + Adam Lambert in 2014

Taylor's first notable appearance was the 2008 Royal Variety Performance, where he played drums for Kerry Ellis and his father Roger Taylor's Queen partner Brian May to an audience including Charles III, then-Prince of Wales, and his wife Camilla, then-Duchess of Cornwall. In 2009, he played with Queen touring musician Spike Edney as part of his SAS (Spike's All-Stars) band. He toured with the Queen musical stage show, We Will Rock You, and worked again alongside Brian May as well as his father with Kerry Ellis on her album Anthems, contributing some drum tracks.

In 2011, Taylor performed alongside his father, when he joined the Queen + Adam Lambert collaboration as a touring musician, providing drums and percussion for the stage show. Some of his notable moments on the tour were his "drum battles" with his father, and taking over as lead drummer on Queen classics such as "Tie Your Mother Down", or on "A Kind of Magic" while his father left the kit to provide lead vocals. Taylor has joined the band on both of their world tours, and remains a mainstay of their live show.

In May 2015, following the departure of Emily Dolan Davies, Taylor became the drummer for English rock band the Darkness, with guitarist Dan Hawkins confirming the news on a UK radio show. He has drummed on the Darkness albums Pinewood Smile (2017), Easter Is Cancelled (2019), Motorheart (2021) and Dreams on Toast (2025).
