= Christmas Time (Don't Let the Bells End) =

2003 single by the Darkness

Single by the Darkness

from the album Permission to Land (Christmas edition)
- B-side: "I Love You 5 Times"
- Released: 15 December 2003
- Genre: Glam metal; Christmas
- Length: 3:39
- Label: Must... Destroy!!; Atlantic
- Songwriters: Justin Hawkins; Dan Hawkins; Frankie Poullain; Ed Graham
- Producer: Bob Ezrin

The Darkness singles chronology
"I Believe in a Thing Called Love" (2003)	"Christmas Time (Don't Let the Bells End)" (2003)	"Love Is Only a Feeling" (2004)

"Christmas Time (Don't Let the Bells End)" is a single released by British hard rock band the Darkness. The single was released on 15 December 2003, to fall in with the UK Christmas number one race, ultimately finishing runner-up. The track was later included on a "Christmas edition" of their debut studio album, Permission to Land, issued in some areas of Europe on 22 December 2003.

== Background ==
The song is a take on the usual structure of Christmas songs. It features the usual mention of festivities, Santa Claus and bells, delivered with Justin Hawkins's trademark falsetto. The school choir that provide backing vocals, which can be heard on the song and seen in the video, are from Haberdashers' Aske's Hatcham College school, in New Cross, London, which Justin and Dan's mother once attended. Following the humour and tone of the Darkness's other work, the song also includes a strong level of parody, most notably the double meaning of the line 'Bells End' (bellend) and 'Ring in peace' (ringpiece). The song appeared as the backing track for the Christmas version of Adult Swim's iOS game, Robot Unicorn Attack, which was released in November 2010.

When asked about the meaning of the song on a television special, Hawkins stated "we managed to get bellend into a Christmas song without it getting banned! (And ringpiece!)"

== Music video ==
The video features the band unwrapping presents. Justin Hawkins thinks of his girlfriend, played by his then-girlfriend and the Darkness's manager, Sue Whitehouse, as pictured in a bauble and in the fire. Justin goes outside and is joined by the rest of the band playing the song. He opens the door to find a choir standing outside singing the song. Justin joins in and invites them inside. Dan Hawkins gives Justin a present; a car key. Justin runs outside and gets into the car while Dan winks to the audience. Inside the car is Justin's girlfriend. They kiss as the spaceship seen in the videos for "I Believe in a Thing Called Love" and "Growing on Me", and on the cover of their debut studio album, Permission to Land, flies across the sky, showing some glittery words, which read 'Merry Christmas'.

== Race for Christmas number one ==
At the start of December 2003, the early favourite to top the UK Singles Chart that Christmas was a cover of "Happy Xmas (War Is Over)" by the finalists of the second series of the British television show Pop Idol – the single was given odds of 8/13, with Sonia Gartside of William Hill remarking: "We can't see them not getting to Number 1." However, by the month's halfway point the song had faded in the charts race, and "Christmas Time (Don't Let the Bells End)" had emerged to become bookmakers' new favourite to be Christmas number one. In the end, the Darkness were beaten by the relatively unknown Gary Jules and Michael Andrews with a cover of Tears for Fears' "Mad World", and thus the band had to settle for the number two position, joining a list of acts including Wham!, the Pogues, Mariah Carey and Cliff Richard to miss out on the top spot (though Richard did have two Christmas number ones in addition to his number twos). According to sales information from Music Week, the Darkness were at number one all week and lost out on Saturday sales – one of the closest battles for Christmas number one in recent years. The song had first-week sales of 222,561 and sold just under 5,000 copies less than "Mad World". According to the Official Charts Company, the song sold 385,000 copies over the Christmas period.

== Track listing ==
- CD single
1. "Christmas Time (Don't Let the Bells End)" – 3:39
2. "I Love You 5 Times" – 3:42
- Digital download
1. "Christmas Time (Don't Let the Bells End)" – 3:39
- German CD single
1. "Christmas Time (Don't Let the Bells End)" – 3:39
2. "I Love You 5 Times" – 3:42
3. "I Believe in a Thing Called Love" (live at Knebworth) – 4:43
4. "Christmas Time (Don't Let the Bells End)" (music video) – 3:45
- Swedish CD single
1. "Christmas Time (Don't Let the Bells End)" – 3:39
2. "I Believe in a Thing Called Love" (single version) – 3:37
- DVD single
1. "Christmas Time (Don't Let the Bells End)" (audio) – 3:39
2. "I Believe in a Thing Called Love" (live at Knebworth – audio) – 4:43
3. "Christmas Time (Don't Let the Bells End)" (music video) – 3:45
- 7-inch vinyl (shaped picture disc)
1. "Christmas Time (Don't Let the Bells End)" – 3:39
2. "I Love You 5 Times" – 3:42

== Charts ==
=== Weekly charts ===
Chart (2003–2004)	Peak position
Australia (ARIA)	63
Denmark (Tracklisten)	9
Ireland (IRMA)	2
Netherlands (Dutch Top 40)	10
Norway (VG-lista)	20
Scotland Singles (OCC)	2
UK Singles (OCC)	2
UK Indie (OCC)	2
UK Rock & Metal (OCC)	1

=== Year-end charts ===
Chart (2003)	Position
Ireland (IRMA)	25
UK Singles (OCC)	10

Chart (2004)	Position
UK Singles (OCC)	185

== Certifications ==
Region	Certification	Certified units/sales
United Kingdom (BPI)	Platinum	600,000^{‡}
^{‡} Sales+streaming figures based on certification alone.

== Release history ==
Region	Date	Format(s)	Label(s)	Ref.
United Kingdom	15 December 2003	7-inch vinyl; CD; DVD	Must... Destroy!!; Atlantic	
Australia	22 November 2004	CD	Must... Destroy!!; EastWest	

== See also ==
- List of UK Rock & Metal Singles Chart number ones of 2010
- List of UK Rock & Metal Singles Chart number ones of 2011
