= The Darkness (band) =

British rock band

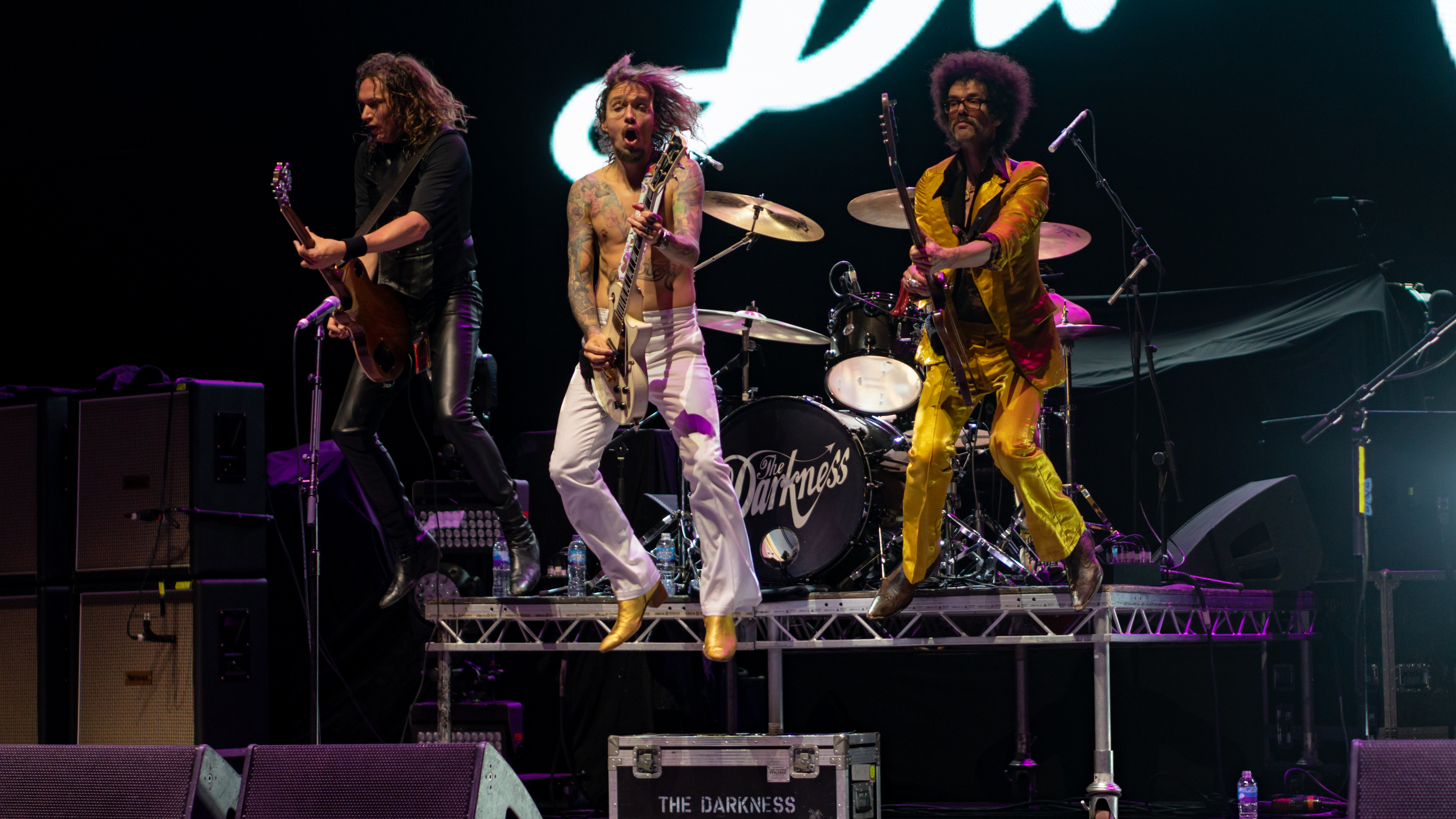
- The Darkness performing at SSE Arena Wembley in 2018

Background information
- Origin: Lowestoft, Suffolk, England
- Genres: Hard rock; glam rock; glam metal
- Years active: 2000–2006; 2011–present
- Labels: Must Destroy; Atlantic; Warner; EastWest; PIAS; Wind-up; Kobalt; Cooking Vinyl
- Spinoffs: Hot Leg; Stone Gods; British Whale; Puppets to the Supreme Commander
- Members: Justin Hawkins; Dan Hawkins; Frankie Poullain; Rufus Tiger Taylor
- Past members: Ed Graham; Richie Edwards; Emily Dolan Davies
- Website: thedarknesslive.com

The Darkness are a British hard rock band formed in Lowestoft in 2000. The band consists of the brothers Justin (vocals, guitar) and Dan Hawkins (guitar), as well as Frankie Poullain (bass) and Rufus Tiger Taylor (drums).

The Darkness came to prominence with the release of their debut album, Permission to Land, in 2003. Backed by the singles "I Believe in a Thing Called Love", "Growing on Me", "Get Your Hands off My Woman", and "Love Is Only a Feeling", the album was certified quadruple platinum in the United Kingdom, with sales of over 1.3 million. In 2004 the band won three Brit Awards: Best British Group, Best British Rock Act, and Best British Album. After extensive touring in support of their debut album, Poullain left the band in 2005, and was replaced by former guitar technician Richie Edwards. The band's second studio album, One Way Ticket to Hell... and Back, was released in November 2005. The following year, Justin Hawkins departed from the band after successfully completing a course of rehabilitation from alcohol and cocaine abuse. This, combined with the poor sales of the album, resulted in Atlantic dropping the band in October 2006. After the split, the remaining members formed Stone Gods, and continued to perform and record without Hawkins, who subsequently fronted his own project, Hot Leg.

In March 2011, the Darkness announced reunion shows, with original bassist Frankie Poullain, including Download Festival 2011, and the Isle of Wight Festival 2012. Their third album, Hot Cakes, was released in August 2012. Original drummer Ed Graham then left the band. A fourth studio album, Last of Our Kind, was released in 2015. A fifth album, Pinewood Smile, was released in 2017, followed by a live album, Live at Hammersmith, in 2018. Their sixth studio album, Easter Is Cancelled, was released in 2019. After the COVID-19 pandemic put a stop to their world tour in 2020, the band ended the year with a one-off streamed live show titled "Streaming of a White Christmas", which was also recorded as a new live album. Their seventh studio album, Motorheart, was released in 2021, followed by an extensive UK tour through November and December. The Darkness performed at the 2025 VE Day Celebration in Horse Guards Parade.

== History ==
=== Early years ===
Justin and Dan Hawkins played together as teenagers in a band which, according to Dan Hawkins, "did a lot of Marillion covers, Bruce Springsteen, Genesis" and were "a bit prog-y". Justin Hawkins had been initially inspired to play guitar by Brian May of Queen, as he loved his tone and vibrato.

Originally known as Empire, the band generated some music industry buzz through their manager Sue Whitehouse, who was based at Savage & Best in Camden. Whitehouse had managed them since Justin Hawkins's time as a creator of music jingles. Renamed the Darkness they became renowned for their live show, and such was the popularity of the band, they had a Carling Homecoming gig booked for the London Astoria before they had even signed a record deal.

Joe Taylor, Aled Jones and Paul Scaife at the Tip Sheet first heard about the band through a post on the Tip Sheet message board, and featured "Love Is Only a Feeling" in January 2002. They started Record of the Day, and featured the song again around the time of SXSW in March 2003. They wanted to feature Friday Night too but they were told the band was saving it for an album.

According to A&R Nick Raphael in an interview with HitQuarters, there was no initial clamour to sign the band, "There couldn't have been less of a buzz, and only two record labels showed any interest in them." He believes the reason for lack of interest was that "The business as a whole thought they were uncool. In fact, people were saying that they were a joke and that they weren't real." Raphael continued: "Now, 3.5 million records later, they're one of the greatest of all bands in the world, and that's because what they did was real; they weren't copying anyone. If they were copying, then they were copying someone from twenty years ago, and no-one else was doing that."

Throughout their career, critics around the world would label them as a "joke band". As part of Sony Music UK, Raphael had attempted to sign them, but the band instead opted to go with Atlantic Records. The band were hired to open for Disturbed on 1 December 2002 at Brixton Academy in which Justin Hawkins recalled numerous fans of Disturbed who threw bottles, shoes, and trash out of disgust at their stark contrast of Disturbed's music. Singer David Draiman later attacked the band for their handling of the ordeal, with Hawkins recounting the issue on his YouTube channel in 2022. Draiman later apologised for the incident, and to Hawkins following the video.

=== Permission to Land and commercial success (2003–2005) ===
Their debut album, Permission to Land, went straight up to number two in the UK charts upon its release on 7 July 2003, before going to number one and staying there for four weeks, eventually going on to sell 1.5 million copies in the UK. The Darkness took inspiration for some of their work from the local north Suffolk area, including "Black Shuck" which mentions the nearby village of Blythburgh.

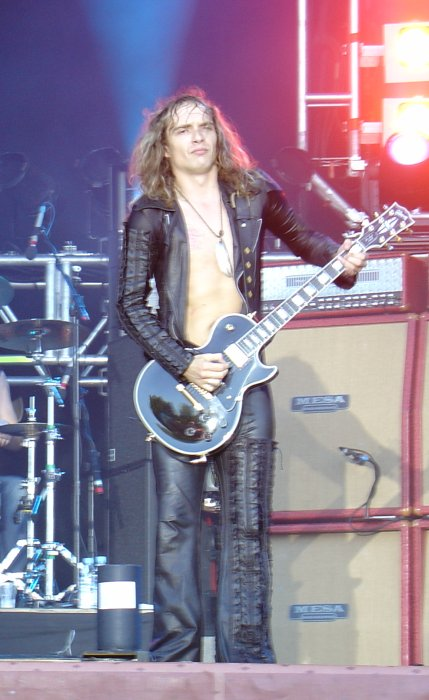
Justin Hawkins at Ankkarock, Finland

The success of the album led to heavy touring for the band over the next two years, including European portions of Metallica's Summer Sanitarium Tour 2003. The band would later be added to the 2004 Big Day Out festival tour, performing alongside Metallica, Muse, the Strokes, Lostprophets, the Mars Volta, and the Black Eyed Peas. They then went on to headline the Reading and Leeds Festivals in 2004. The band won three BRIT Awards in 2004 in response to the album, Best Group, Best Rock Group and Best Album. They also won two Kerrang! awards in 2004 for Best Live Act and Best British Band. The third single from the album, "I Believe in a Thing Called Love", was a smash hit in the UK and the United States, becoming the second highest-charting single of 2003 released by a UK band in America. The band also managed a Christmas 2003 number 1 attempt, "Christmas Time (Don't Let the Bells End)", which only just fell short, both singles reaching number 2 in 2003.

=== One Way Ticket to Hell... And Back and decline (2005–2006) ===
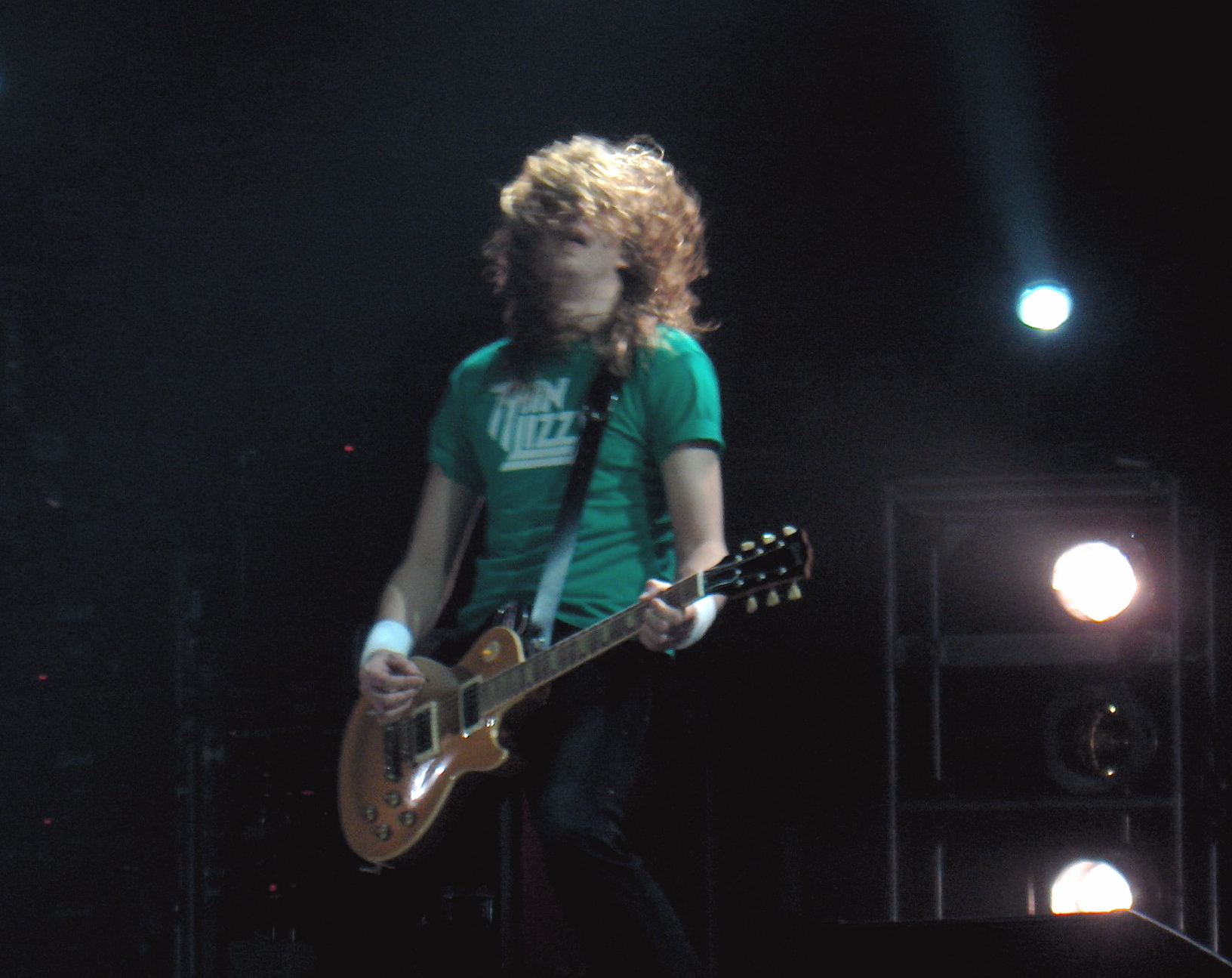
Dan Hawkins at Helsinki Ice Hall in Helsinki, Finland

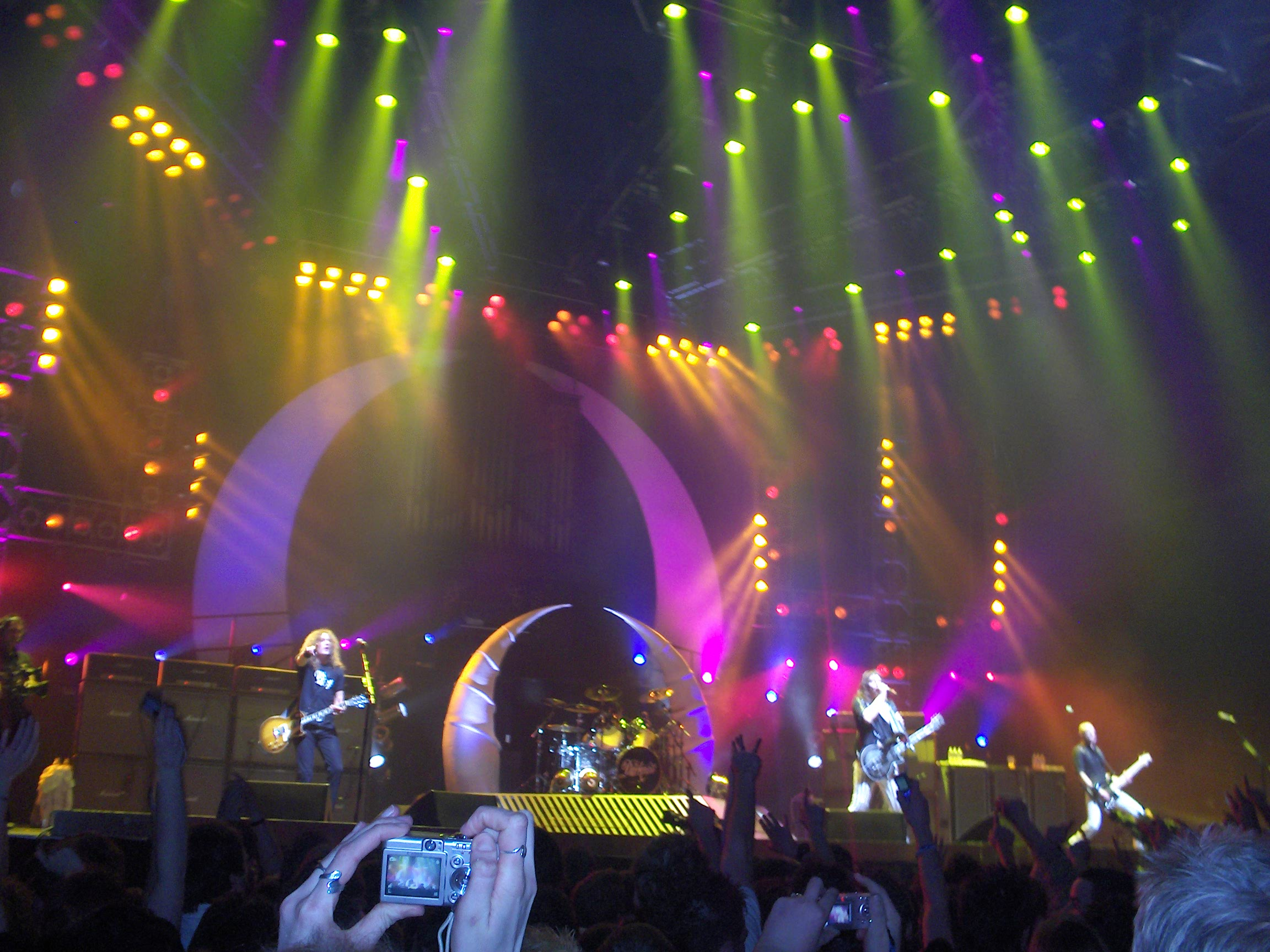
The Darkness live in Glasgow, Scotland, February 2006

In October 2005, a month before the album was to be officially released, Justin Hawkins won an eBay auction for a copy of One Way Ticket to Hell ...and Back for £350 under the username 'turbogunhawk'. He claimed he did this so that he could track down whoever sold the digitally-marked advance copy of the album and try to prevent it from happening again.

"One Way Ticket", the first single from their second album, was released on 14 November 2005, debuting and peaking at number 8 on the UK singles chart. The album itself was released on 28 November 2005 to mixed reviews. The album was produced by rock producer Roy Thomas Baker, best known for his work with Queen. Early sales figures in the UK showed the album had not sold as well as its predecessor, Permission to Land. The album debuted at number 11, and fell to number 34 in the second week of its release. Although it has since reached platinum status, this contrasts with their debut's four-time platinum status.

The second single taken from their second album was "Is It Just Me?", released on 20 February 2006. The single gained a preliminary position of No. 6 all that week, but finally charted at number 8. The album's third single, "Girlfriend", was Released 22 May and charted at number 39.

=== Justin Hawkins's departure and break-up (2006) ===
In August 2006, lead singer Justin Hawkins was admitted to a rehabilitation clinic in concern of his health, which caused the band to cancel several concerts. Around this same time the band confirmed that they were to start working on their third album to be released early 2007. Tabloid rumours held that Justin Hawkins was leaving the band after completing his course of rehabilitation from alcohol and cocaine problems, and the band would continue without him, possibly with Richie Edwards as the front man. In response to the story being reported by the media, the Darkness confirmed on their official forum:

"We're sorry that you had to find this out through the newspapers, but we were hoping until the last minute that this – Justin's exit – wasn't going to happen. We – Dan, Ed and Richie – are still in total shock and can't say at this stage what the future holds. We would like to thank all our fans, partners and family for their continuous support. You will hear from us, once we know what we want to do..."

Hawkins's departure, and the lacklustre sales of One Way Ticket to Hell..., led to Atlantic dropping the band from the label. Using the pseudonym British Whale, Hawkins went on to release a cover version of the Sparks song "This Town Ain't Big Enough for Both of Us", reaching No. 6 in the UK singles chart. In 2007, he launched a failed attempt to represent the UK in the Eurovision Song Contest. In 2011, Hawkins gave a different explanation for his departure from the band, saying he had left because he felt the band had stopped being creative.

=== Other projects (2006–2011) ===
On 9 November 2007, it was announced on the University of East Anglia's student union website that a new band had been created comprising Dan Hawkins (lead guitar), Toby MacFarlaine (bass), Ed Graham (drums) and Ritchie Edwards (vocals/guitar). The name of the band was The Stone Gods.

In 2008, Justin Hawkins formed a new band, Hot Leg with Pete Rinaldi (of Anchorhead), Samuel SJ Stokes (formerly of The Thieves) and Darby Todd (from Protect the Beat). In 2009 Hot Leg released an album, Red Light Fever, which charted at #81. Three singles were taken from it with two of them failing to chart. By December 2010, both Hot Leg and The Stone Gods were in hiatus.

=== Reunion and Hot Cakes (2011–2013) ===
In March 2011, the four original band members reunited. They played three warm-up shows in Norwich, Leamington and at London's Shepherd's Bush Empire, before performing at the 2011 Download Festival. This was followed by an "intimate" show at London's 100 Club, which featured support from Dark Stares and notable appearances from Queen guitarist Brian May and comedian Rufus Hound. The band then toured Japan, the UK and Ireland.

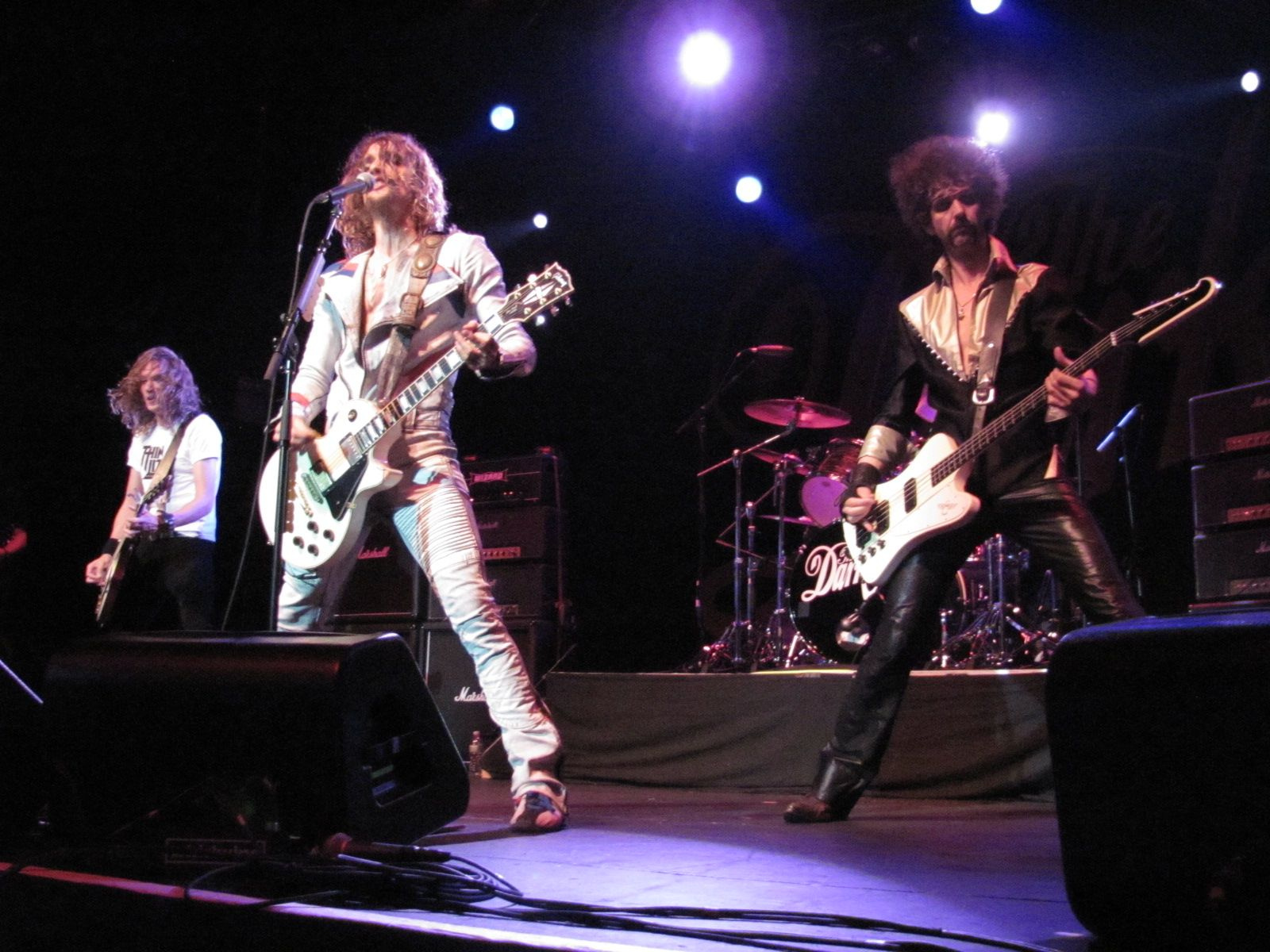
The Darkness performing at performing at Terminal 5 in 2012. Left to right: Dan and Justin Hawkins, Frankie Poullain

A new song, "Nothing's Gonna Stop Us", was released in February 2012 as a free download. They toured North America, playing with Crown Jewel Defense and Foxy Shazam, then performed at the Sweden Rock Festival in Sölvesborg, Sweden and the 18th Przystanek Woodstock. Singles "Every Inch of You" and "Everybody Have a Good Time" were released in May and June 2012, respectively, ahead of their third album, Hot Cakes, which came out in August. Throughout the summer the Darkness played a series of festival dates, including headlining the Big Top Tent at the 2012 Isle of Wight Festival, and were the opening act for the European, Latin American and African leg of Lady Gaga's Born This Way Ball world tour. A new non-album song, "The Horn", was released in late 2013 as a download.

=== Last of Our Kind and new line-up (2014–2017) ===
The band began work on their fourth studio album in September 2014, with Emily Dolan Davies replacing Ed Graham on drums. The new album, Last of Our Kind, was released on 2 June 2015, on the band's own label Canary Dwarf Records via Kobalt Label Services with a single, "Open Fire", released on 23 March. The first track from the album to be premiered was "Barbarian", which was released with an accompanying animated music video on 23 February.

On 21 April 2015, the band issued a statement saying that drummer Davies had left the band. On 25 April 2015, it was announced via the band's official Facebook page that Rufus Taylor, the son of Queen drummer Roger Taylor, was to join the band as Davies' replacement on drums.

They were announced as the first headline act for Planet Rockstock 2015, taking place at Trecco Bay in South Wales from 4 to 7 December 2015. The Darkness closed the event on 6 December. On 20 November 2015, the band released a music video for a new Christmas single, "I Am Santa", on their YouTube channel, which it was announced would be included in the deluxe edition of the Last of Our Kind album.

=== Pinewood Smile (2017–2019) ===
The Darkness worked on a feature-length documentary, directed by Simon Emmett. In a 2016 interview, Frankie Poullain said, "We are currently over a year in to a feature-length documentary which will surprise a lot of people."

In March 2017, the Darkness announced that their fifth studio album would be released in 2017. This was confirmed in a July issue of Planet Rock, and later on the band's Facebook page. The album's title was later revealed as Pinewood Smile, and was due to be released on 6 October of the same year. The first single from the album "All The Pretty Girls" was released on 22 July of that year. The band embarked on a winter tour of the UK in November and December 2017.

In May 2017, the Darkness performed at the Australian touring music festival Groovin' the Moo, performing at six regional cities across Australia. They performed as a de facto opening act for the "headline act" of the festival, Violent Soho, and supported Guns N' Roses on the European leg of their tour. In December 2017, Justin & Dan Hawkins were contestants on the Pointless Celebrities Christmas special.

In 2018, the band supported US supergroup Hollywood Vampires on their European tour, which included their first performances in UK arenas in several years. They also announced their first live album, Live at Hammersmith, a recording of their December 2017 concert at the Eventim Apollo in London. This was released on 15 June 2018. The band contributed theme music to the British children's television programme Catie's Amazing Machines which premiered on CBeebies in October 2018.

=== Easter Is Cancelled (2019–2021) ===
In 2019, the Darkness released their sixth studio album Easter Is Cancelled on 4 October 2019 through Cooking Vinyl. Easter Is Cancelled became the band's fourth UK Top 10 album and topped the Official Charts Top 40 Rock And Metal Chart and the iTunes Rock Chart, while the record has achieved over 3 million streams on Spotify alone.

The album was released to a generally positive response from music critics while the previous singles "Heart Explodes" and "Rock and Roll Deserves to Die" proved a radio hit on the playlists of Radio 2, Absolute, Kerrang and more. The comedic video for "Rock and Roll Deserves to Die" has also individually surpassed 1 million views.

In January 2020, the Darkness released a new video for "In Another Life" which featured model Abbey Clancy. The track then made the BBC Radio 2 B-List. The band commenced their UK tour of the Easter Is Cancelled album on 25 November 2019 in Ireland, culminating on 20 December at London's Roundhouse.

In 2020, the band attempted a worldwide tour across Europe, Australia, New Zealand, and North America. The tour abruptly ended in Adelaide, Australia on 15 March as the COVID-19 pandemic and subsequent stay-at-home orders set in. The band returned to the UK for occasional shows and live streams where possible, with an aim to reschedule the remainder of the postponed New Zealand and North American dates in the future.

In December the band played a one-off show at The IndigO2 in London. Initial plans to open the show and sound check to a limited audience were shut down at the last minute due to the Coronavirus pandemic. The show still went ahead but only accessible by live stream. The whole show was recorded for a live album titled Streaming Of A White Christmas, which was released on CD and vinyl in early 2021.

=== Motorheart and Dreams on Toast (2021–present) ===
For most of the first half of 2021 the band remained largely quiet on social media. On 4 June 2021, the band announced they were set to release their seventh studio album Motorheart in October. The album was eventually released on 19 November 2021. The album's cover was also unveiled in the announcement. The first single, "Motorheart", was released in August 2021. Along with the album release, the band announced an extensive list of UK tour dates to take place throughout November and December in support of the release of the album.

In January and February 2023, the band played UK arenas with Black Stone Cherry for the band's first UK arena tour since 2006. In November 2023, the band released a feature documentary film called Welcome To The Darkness, for a one night cinema release. It was available on DVD by December 2023. On 18 September 2024, The Darkness announced that their eighth studio album Dreams on Toast would be released in March 2025. The Darkness performed at the VE Day 80 celebration in Horseguards Parade on 8 May 2025.

The band announced that in December 2026 they will play 7 UK arena dates. This will be the band's first headline Arena tour since 2006.

== Band members ==
Current members

- Justin Hawkins – lead vocals, lead and rhythm guitar, keyboards (2000–2006, 2011–present)
- Dan Hawkins – rhythm and lead guitar, backing vocals (2000–2006, 2011–present); additional drums, percussion (2005)
- Frankie Poullain – bass, backing vocals (2000–2005, 2011–present)
- Rufus Tiger Taylor – drums, backing vocals (2015–present)

Current touring musicians

- Ian "Softlad" Norfolk – rhythm guitar, mandolin, acoustic guitar, keyboards (2019–present)

Former members

- Ed Graham – drums (2000–2006, 2011–2014)
- Richie Edwards – bass, backing vocals (2005–2006)
- Emily Dolan Davies – drums, backing vocals (2014–2015)

Former touring musicians

- Darby Todd – drums (2012)

== Discography ==
=== Studio albums ===
- Permission to Land (2003)
- One Way Ticket to Hell... and Back (2005)
- Hot Cakes (2012)
- Last of Our Kind (2015)
- Pinewood Smile (2017)
- Easter Is Cancelled (2019)
- Motorheart (2021)
- Dreams on Toast (2025)

== Awards and honours ==
Award	Year	Nominee(s)	Category	Result	Ref.
Classic Rock Roll of Honour Awards	2013	Themselves	Showman of the Year	Won	
Classic Rock Roll of Honour Awards	2015	Last of Our Kind	Album of the Year	Nominated	
Kerrang! Awards	2003	Themselves	Best Live Act	Won	
Kerrang! Awards	2003	Permission to Land	Best Album	Won	
Kerrang! Awards	2004	Themselves	Best British Band	Won	
Kerrang! Awards	2004	Themselves	Best Live Band	Won	
Mercury Prize	2003	Permission to Land	Album of the Year	Nominated	
Pop Factory Awards	2002	Themselves	Best Pop Factory Performance	Nominated	
Pop Factory Awards	2002	Themselves	Best Pop Factory Debut	Nominated	

=== 2003 ===
- Metal Hammer 'Golden God' for Best Single (Get Your Hands off My Woman)
- MTV Europe Music Award for Best MTV2 UK Act

=== 2004 ===
- Metal Hammer 'Golden God' for Best Video ("Love Is Only a Feeling")
- Ivor Novello Award for Songwriters of the Year
- BRIT Award for Best British Group
- BRIT Award for Best Rock Act
- BRIT Award for Best British Album (Permission to Land)
- MTV Europe Music Award for Best Rock (nominated)
- IFPI Platinum Europe Award for sales in Europe in excess of 1,000,000 ^{(triple Platinum)} (Permission to Land)
- Elle Style Award for Most Stylish Band
- Meteor Ireland Award for Best Album (Permission to Land)
- Smash Hits! Pollwinners' Party for Best Rock Award
- RIAA Digital Sales Certifications Gold Award for 100,000 downloads ("I Believe in a Thing Called Love")
- European Border Breakers Award for debut albums of European acts achieving the best sales outside of their country of origin in 2003 (Permission to Land)
- Denmark GAFFA Award for Best Foreign New Act (nominated)
- Denmark GAFFA Award for Best Foreign Hit ("I Believe in a Thing Called Love") (nominated)

=== 2005 ===
- ASCAP Award for one of the Most Performed Works in the USA ("I Believe in a Thing Called Love")

=== 2006 ===
- MTV Australia's Best Man Rock Video award ("One Way Ticket")

=== 2008 ===
- VH1 The 100 Greatest Hard Rock Songs "I Believe in a Thing Called Love" (94)

=== 2011 ===
- VH1 The 100 Greatest Songs of '00s "I Believe in a Thing Called Love" (87)

=== 2020 ===
- Classic Rock magazine awarded "I Believe in a Thing Called Love" the number one spot on their Greatest Songs of the Century (so far) reader poll.
