= Ed Graham =

British drummer

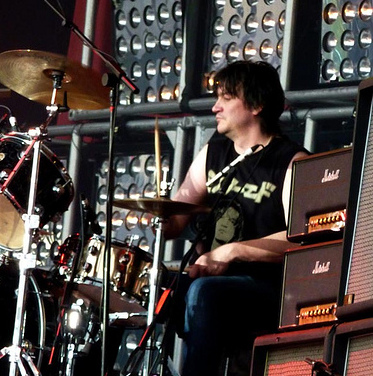
- Ed Graham performing with The Darkness at Download Festival, Donington Park, England (10 June 2011)

Background information
- Also known as: Ed, Eddie, Pocket
- Born: Edwin James Graham; 20 February 1977 (age 49)
- Genres: Glam metal, hard rock, glam rock, heavy metal
- Occupation: Drummer
- Years active: 2000–2008, 2011–present
- Website: thedarknesslive.com

Edwin James Graham (born 20 February 1977) is an English musician who is best known as the original drummer of the rock band The Darkness, as well as the subsequent successor band Stone Gods fronted by guitarist and singer Richie Edwards.

== Early life ==
Graham grew up in Oulton Broad in Lowestoft, attending Kirkley High School with the Hawkins brothers. Not particularly sporty, Graham would spend his break times isolated in the music room where he began to play the drums. After school Graham studied art at Lowestoft College. In 1998 and 1999, Graham studied Film and Television at Salisbury College, gaining a Higher National Diploma.

== Career ==
After leaving Salisbury College, Graham returned to Lowestoft and worked in a Sanyo factory for six months to raise money to move to London. In 2000 he moved to Finsbury Park, soon relocating to Camden Town, where he remained for over ten years. His first band in London was Q*Sling fronted by Norwegian born Paul-Ronney Angel, who later went on to form the Urban Voodoo Machine.

The Darkness were conceived at a Millennium Eve party by Justin and Dan Hawkins. The line up was completed some months later by Graham and bass player Frankie Poullain. Graham played on three studio albums: Permission to Land, One Way Ticket to Hell... and Back and Hot Cakes. In 2006, the Darkness split due to Justin Hawkins leaving. Graham and Dan Hawkins went on to form the Stone Gods, recruiting Toby Macfarlaine and promoting Darkness guitar technician Richie Edwards to frontman.

In July 2008, it was announced that he was permanently leaving the band due to health issues. SPIN magazine confirmed that Graham was suffering with avascular necrosis, a rare condition causing lack of blood supply to the femur. In 2009, Graham underwent bilateral hip surgery (a major operation) which was a complete success.

Subsequently, he formed the band Karaoke for Beginners with ex Silverfish guitarist Andrew "Fuzz" Duprey.

In 2011, the Darkness reunited with all four founding members, with Download 2011 being one of their first come back shows. Following this, the band played numerous European and U.S festivals and toured with Lady Gaga. In October 2014, it was announced that Graham and the band were no longer working together, stating that "for various reasons, we have all decided to move on. We love Ed and we wish him happiness."

In 2015, Graham was the subject of a photographic documentary by photographer Nick Elliott recording Graham's personal and professional life since his departure from the Darkness.

In 2015, Graham formed another band with singer-songwriter Angus Duprey. The band, Puppets to the Supreme Commander, intended to release an EP and play UK shows ahead of an album release.

In 2017, Graham performed drums for a one-off band, the Venus Reaction. The project, set up by friend and Puppets to the Supreme Commander bandmate David Donley, also featured Amie Conradine, Jim Lowe, and Glen Matlock of the Sex Pistols. The band released a double A side vinyl single, in a limited run of 500 copies.
