= Frankie Poullain =

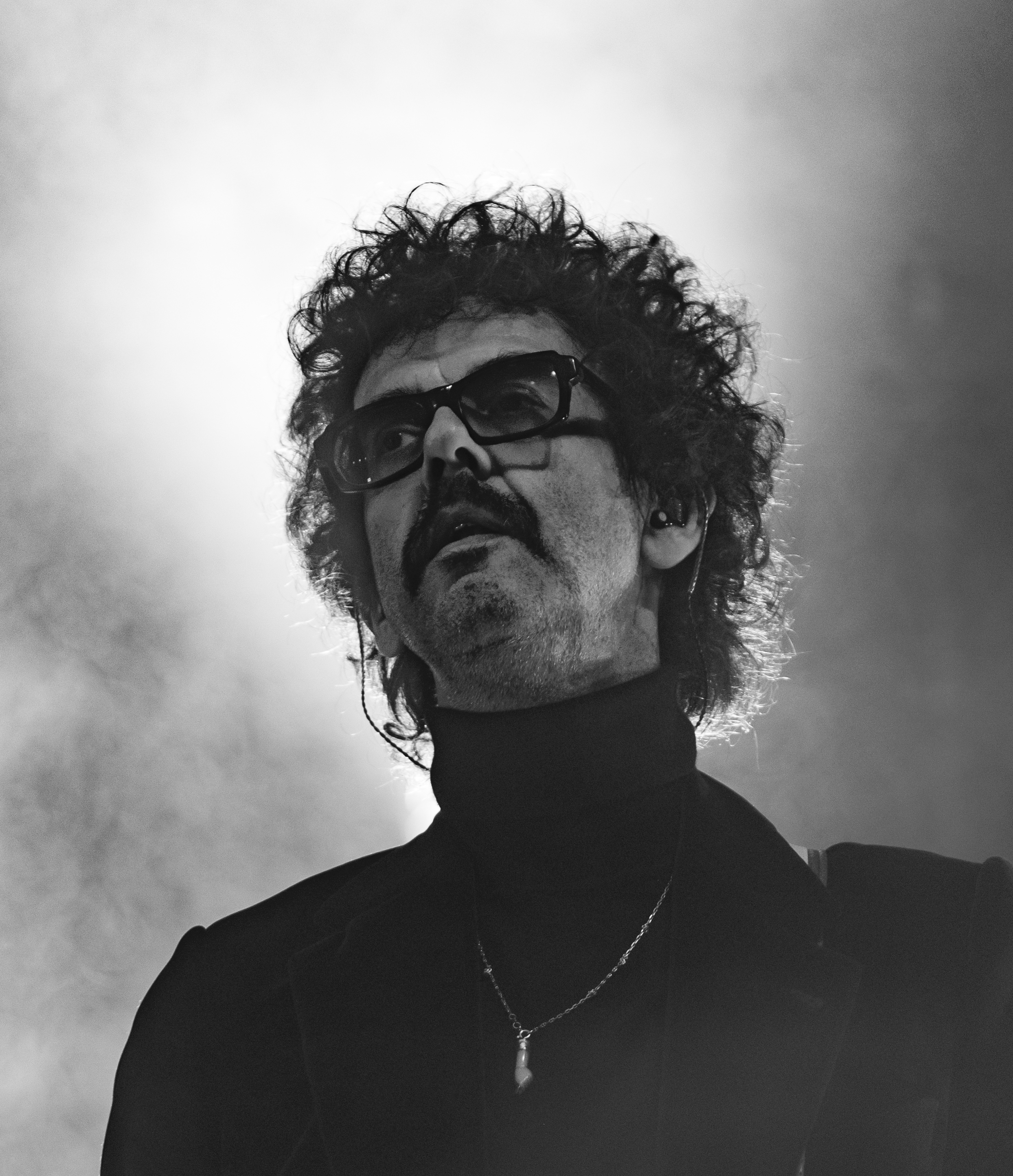
- Frankie Poullain performing with The Darkness in Oslo, Norway in 2025

Background information
- Born: Francis Gilles Poullain-Patterson; 15 April 1967 (age 58)
- Genres: Hard rock, glam metal, heavy metal
- Occupations: Musician, songwriter
- Instrument: Bass
- Years active: 2000–present
- Member of: The Darkness

Francis Gilles Poullain-Patterson (born 15 April 1967), better known as Frankie Poullain, is a Scottish bass player, best known for playing with The Darkness. He was raised in Milnathort, then Edinburgh, Scotland.

== Early life ==
His father was Austin Patterson, a classical violinist, who played with The Edinburgh Quartet and BBC Concert Orchestra in the late 1960s and early 1970s. He uses his mother Catherine's surname, Poullain, as she brought him up from the age of 7, when his father left him to live in the Caribbean. He is the step-brother of comedian, Phil Kay.

Poullain wanted to be a football commentator growing up, but he developed a stammer and moved to wanting to be a football journalist, but "when all else failed I thought fuck it I will be a rock star". A big influence in Poullain's style of music came when he was eleven, when he saw a punk band live.

Poullain attended the Royal High School, leaving in 1985. He undertook a succession of menial jobs and played in local west country bands, before moving to London in order to become a serious musician. Poullain began a BA Honours in English literature at Bath University in 1986 but left in his second year, becoming disillusioned with the teaching and intent on becoming a writer or musician in his own right.

== Music career ==
In 1996, Poullain founded the band Empire which the Hawkins brothers Justin Hawkins and Dan Hawkins joined in 1997 as keyboardist and guitarist respectively, and which later became The Darkness. With The Darkness he has won 3 Brits as well as MTV, Kerrang and Classic Rock awards. Poullain co-wrote songs such as "Love Is Only a Feeling", "Heart Explodes", "One Way Ticket" and "Rock 'n' Roll Deserves to Die".

He composed the music for the first ever Darkness song, "I Love You 5 Times", in 1996, which was later recorded at Abbey Road Studios and released as the B-side to the band's Christmas single "Christmas Time (Don't Let the Bells End)" in 2003.

The band were nominated for the Mercury Prize in 2003. He won an Ivor Novello award, along with his fellow band members in 2004, for ‘Songwriters Of The Year’. Poullain left the band on 23 May 2005 citing "musical differences". He was replaced by Richie Edwards, the band's former guitar technician.

In 2011 The Darkness announced that they were to reunite with all four original members. Poullain described this as being "just like old times". In 2016, Poullain sang lead vocals on "Conquerors", the final song on the album Last of Our Kind. The song was featured in Simon Emmett's 2023 documentary about the band, Welcome to the Darkness.

== Equipment ==
Poullain’s bass of choice is the Gibson Thunderbird which is used almost exclusively on the band’s various albums. He plays through a Hiwatt 200 bass head and an 8x10 speaker. He also uses an Aguilar Tone Hammer to define his sound.

He plays cowbell on various songs but most famously on the band’s single ‘One Way Ticket’ which features an extended live intro showcasing his skills.
