= The Rasmus discography =

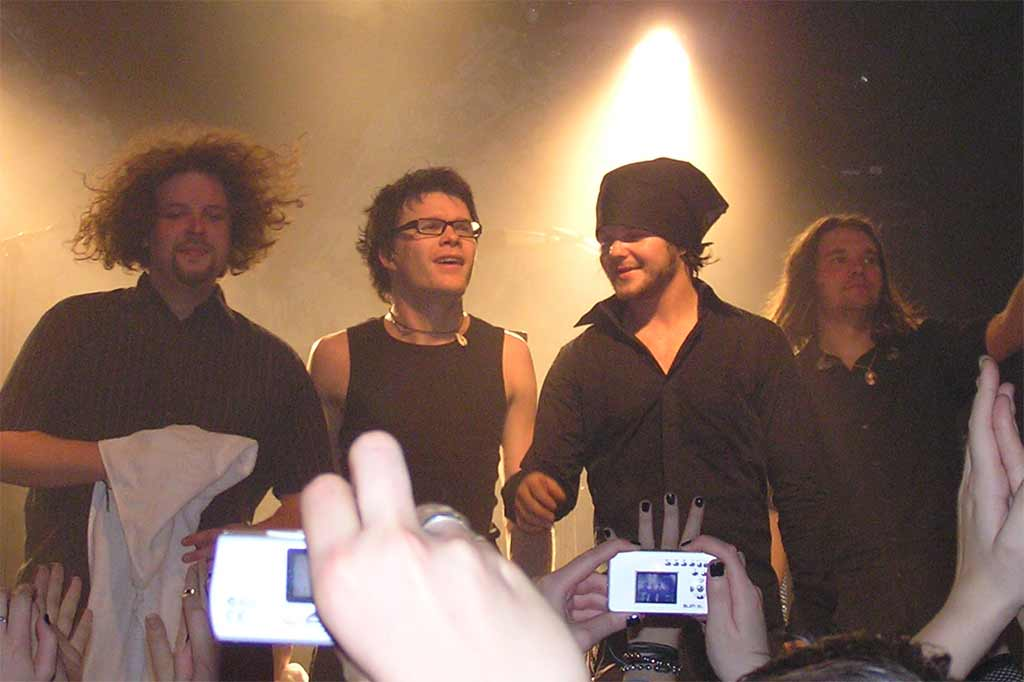
- Studio albums: 11
- Extended plays: 4
- Live albums: 1
- Compilation albums: 2
- Singles: 46
- Video albums: 3
- Music videos: 40

The discography of the Finnish rock band The Rasmus currently consists of eleven studio albums, two compilation albums and forty-six singles.

== Albums ==
=== Studio albums ===
List of albums, with selected chart positions, sales figures and certifications
Title	Album details	Peak chart positions										Sales	Certifications
Title	Album details	FIN	AUT	BEL	FRA	GER	ITA	NLD	SWE	SWI	UK	Sales	Certifications
Peep	Released: 23 September 1996; Label: Warner; Format: CD	16	—	—	—	—	—	—	—	—	—		
Playboys	Released: 29 August 1997; Label: Warner; Format: CD	5	—	—	—	—	—	—	—	—	—		
Hell of a Tester	Released: 2 November 1998; Label: Warner; Format: CD	16	—	—	—	—	—	—	—	—	—		
Into	Released: 29 October 2001; Label: Playground; Format: CD	1	—	—	—	—	—	—	—	—	—	FIN: 72,950	IFPI FIN: 2× Platinum
Dead Letters	Released: 21 March 2003; Label: Playground; Format: CD, digital download	1	1	20	3	1	22	29	17	1	10	FIN: 78,363	IFPI FIN: 2× Platinum; BPI: Gold; BVMI: Platinum; IFPI AUT: Gold; IFPI SWE: Gold; IFPI SWI: Platinum
Hide from the Sun	Released: 12 September 2005; Label: Playground; Format: CD, digital download	1	4	35	29	3	18	27	16	5	65	FIN: 34,254	IFPI FIN: Platinum
Black Roses	Released: 26 September 2008; Label: Playground; Format: CD, digital download	1	22	—	—	13	38	51	32	22	—	FIN: 19,559	IFPI FIN: Gold
The Rasmus	Released: 18 April 2012; Label: Universal; Format: CD, digital download	3	23	—	—	26	—	—	—	46	—	FIN: 10,600	IFPI FIN: Gold
Dark Matters	Released: 6 October 2017; Label: Playground; Format: CD, digital download	7	47	—	—	61	—	—	—	52	—		
Rise	Released: 23 September 2022; Label: Playground; Format: CD, LP, digital download	4	—	—	—	34	—	—	—	37	—		
Weirdo	Released: 12 September 2025; Label: Playground; Format: CD, digital download	22	61	—	—	—	—	—	—	95	—		
"—" denotes items that did not chart or were not released.

=== Compilation albums ===
List of compilation albums with selected chart positions
Title	Album details	Peak chart positions	Sales	Certifications
Title	Album details	FIN	Sales	Certifications
Hell of a Collection	Released: 2001; Label: Warner; Format: CD	2	FIN: 50,908	IFPI FIN: Platinum
Best of 2001–2009	Released: 2 November 2009; Label: Playground; Format: CD, digital download	8		

=== EPs ===
List of EPs
Title	Album details
1st	Released: 1995; Label: Warner Music Finland; Format: CD
2nd	Released: 1996; Label: Warner Music Finland; Format: CD
3rd	Released: 1996; Label: Warner Music Finland; Format: CD
Dark Summer (Rise Outtakes)	Released: 2026; Label: Playground Music Scandinavia; Format: Online streaming

=== Video albums ===
List of video albums
Title	Album details
Live Letters	Released: 6 December 2004; Label: Playground Music Scandinavia; Format: DVD
Live 2012 / Mysteria	Released: December 2012; Label: Shadowland Ltd.; Format: DVD
Live 2012 / Volume II.	Released: December 2013; Label: Shadowland Ltd.; Format: DVD

== Singles ==
List of singles, with selected chart positions and certifications, showing year released and album name
Title	Year	Peak chart positions										Sales	Certifications	Album
Title	Year	FIN	AUT	BEL (FL)	FRA	GER	ITA	NLD	SWE	SWI	UK	Sales	Certifications	Album
"Blue"	1997	3	—	—	—	—	—	—	—	—	—			Playboys
"Kola"	1997	—	—	—	—	—	—	—	—	—	—			Playboys
"Playboys"	1997	—	—	—	—	—	—	—	—	—	—			Playboys
"Ice"	1998	2	—	—	—	—	—	—	—	—	—			Playboys
"Liquid"	1998	2	—	—	—	—	—	—	—	—	—			Hell of a Tester
"Swimming with the Kids"	1999	16	—	—	—	—	—	—	—	—	—			Hell of a Tester
"F-F-F-Falling"	2001	1	—	—	—	—	—	—	—	—	—	FIN: 10,926	IFPI FIN: Platinum	Into
"Chill"	2001	2	—	—	—	—	—	—	—	—	—	FIN: 5,022	IFPI FIN: Gold	Into
"Madness"	2001	2	—	—	—	—	—	—	—	—	—			Into
"Heartbreaker/Days"	2002	1	—	—	—	—	—	—	—	—	—			Into
"In the Shadows"	2003	1	2	6	6	1	2	6	2	2	3	FIN: 5,955	IFPI FIN: Gold; BPI: Gold; BVMI: Platinum; IFPI SWE: Gold; IFPI SWI: Gold	Dead Letters
"In My Life"	2003	2	—	55	—	—	—	51	—	—	—			Dead Letters
"First Day of My Life"	2003	4	9	31	—	6	12	28	31	20	50			Dead Letters
"Funeral Song (The Resurrection)"	2004	2	32	—	—	24	44	—	—	54	—			Dead Letters
"Guilty"	2004	2	32	67	—	20	39	58	—	43	15			Dead Letters
"No Fear"	2005	1	16	56	41	13	19	17	23	44	43			Hide from the Sun
"Sail Away"	2005	2	53	68	—	34	46	74	58	51	94			Hide from the Sun
"Shot"	2006	6	49	—	—	46	—	91	—	—	—			Hide from the Sun
"Keep Your Heart Broken"	2006	—	—	—	—	—	—	—	—	—	—			Hide from the Sun
"Livin' in a World Without You"	2008	1	26	—	—	14	—	—	—	78	—			Black Roses
"Justify"	2009	—	61	—	—	56	—	—	—	—	—			Black Roses
"October & April" (featuring Anette Olzon)	2009	3	—	—	—	79	—	—	—	—	—			Best of 2001–2009
"I'm a Mess"	2012	—	—	—	—	—	—	—	—	—	—			The Rasmus
"Stranger"	2012	—	—	—	—	—	—	—	—	—	—			The Rasmus
"Mysteria"	2012	—	—	—	—	—	—	—	—	—	—			The Rasmus
"Paradise"	2017	—	—	—	—	—	—	—	—	—	—			Dark Matters
"Silver Night"	2017	—	—	—	—	—	—	—	—	—	—			Dark Matters
"Something in the Dark"	2017	—	—	—	—	—	—	—	—	—	—			Dark Matters
"Wonderman"	2017	—	—	—	—	—	—	—	—	—	—			Dark Matters
"Nothing"	2017	—	—	—	—	—	—	—	—	—	—			Dark Matters
"Holy Grail"	2018	—	—	—	—	—	—	—	—	—	—			Non-album single
"Bones"	2021	—	—	—	—	—	—	—	—	—	—			Rise
"Venomous Moon" (featuring Apocalyptica)	2021	—	—	—	—	—	—	—	—	—	—			Rise
"Jezebel"	2022	4	—	—	—	—	—	—	— (Note: "Jezebel" did not enter the Swedish Singellista Chart, but peaked at number seven on the Swedish Heatseeker Chart.)	—	—			Rise
"Rise"	2022	—	—	—	—	—	—	—	—	—	—			Rise
"Live and Never Die"	2022	—	—	—	—	—	—	—	—	—	—			Rise
"In The Shadows Of Ukraine" (with Kalush Orchestra)	2022	—	—	—	—	—	—	—	—	—	—			Non-album single
"Fireflies" (featuring Charles Ans)	2023	—	—	—	—	—	—	—	—	—	—			Rise
"Rest in Pieces"	2024	—	—	—	—	—	—	—	—	—	—			Weirdo
"Creatures of Chaos"	2025	—	—	—	—	—	—	—	—	—	—			Weirdo
"Break These Chains" (featuring Niko Vilhelm)	2025	—	—	—	—	—	—	—	—	—	—			Weirdo
"Love is a Bitch"	2025	—	—	—	—	—	—	—	—	—	—			Weirdo
"Say It Again" (with Bad Wolves)	2025	—	—	—	—	—	—	—	—	—	—			Die About It
"Weirdo" (featuring Lee Jennings)	2025	—	—	—	—	—	—	—	—	—	—			Weirdo
"Creatures of Chaos" (featuring Tyler Connolly)	2025	—	—	—	—	—	—	—	—	—	—			Weirdo
"Forever Young" (Alphaville cover)	2026	—	—	—	—	—	—	—	—	—	—			Non-album single
"—" denotes items that did not chart or were not released.

== Music videos ==
Year	Title	Director
1996	"Funky Jam"	The Rasmus & Teja Kotilainen
1997	"Playboys"	The Rasmus & Illka Herkman
1998	"Liquid"	Viljami Eronen
2001	"F-F-F-Falling"	Miikka Lommi
2001	"Chill"	The Rasmus
2003	"In the Shadows" (Finnish "Bandit" version)	Finn Andersson for Film Magica Oy
2003	"In My Life"	Niclas Fronda & Fredrik Löfberg, Baranga Film/Topaz
2003	"In the Shadows" (European "Crow" version)	Niclas Fronda & Fredrik Löfberg, Baranga Film
2003	"First Day of My Life"	Sven Bollinger
2004	"In the Shadows" (US/UK "Mirror" version)	Philipp Stölzl
2004	"In the Shadows" (Mexican version)	—
2004	"Funeral Song"	Niclas Fronda & Fredrik Löfberg, Baranga Film
2004	"Guilty"	Nathan Cox
2005	"No Fear"	Jörn Heitmann
2005	"Sail Away"	Mathias Vielsäcker & Christoph Mangler
2006	"Shot"	Sandra Marschner
2007	"Immortal"	Eero Heinonen
2008	"Livin' in a World Without You"	Niclas Fronda
2008	"Justify"	Owe Lingvall (Pauli Rantasalmi's idea)
2009	"October & April" (featuring Anette Olzon)	Owe Lingvall
2009	"Your Forgiveness"	Eero Heinonen
2012	"I'm a Mess"	Jopsu Ramu - Timo Ramu
2012	"Somewhere"	Eero Heinonen
2012	"Stranger"	Aku Louhimies
2012	"Mysteria"	Miikka Lommi
2017	"Paradise"	Gustav Olsson
2017	"Wonderman"	Jesse Haaja
2017	"Silver Night"	Vesa Manninen
2018	"Nothing"	Eero Heinonen
2021	"Venomous Moon" (featuring Apocalyptica)	Vertti Virkajärvi
2022	"Jezebel"	Jesse Haaja
2022	"Rise"	Heikki Slåen
2022	"Live And Never Die"	Georgius Misjura & Aleksei Kulikov
2022	"In The Shadows Of Ukraine" with Kalush Orchestra	Leonid Kolosovskyi
2023	"Fireflies" (featuring Charles Ans)	Jesús Meneses
2025	"Creatures Of Chaos"	Aleksei Kulikov
2025	"Break These Chains" (featuring Niko Vilhelm)	Aleksei Kulikov
2025	"Love Is A Bitch"	Aleksei Kulikov, Matthias Veinmann
2025	"Weirdo" (featuring Lee Jennings)	Aleksei Kulikov, Matthias Veinmann
2025	"Banksy"	Eero Heinonen

== Other releases ==
- "Maximum Rasmus" – An unofficial audio CD with the band's biography and some interviews. It was released on 15 November 2004 by the record label Chrome Dream.
- "The Rasmus Player" – A PC software with videos, photos, information and more. It was released on many singles from the album Hide from the Sun, 2005.

== B-sides, bonus tracks and unreleased songs ==
All songs that do not appear on original album releases, excluding acoustic versions, demos and remixes.

Song	Releases	Intended "The Rasmus" release
"Bones"	Bones; Rise Vinyl Edition	Rise
"Can't Stop Me"	B-Side of Chill; Into Special Edition	Into
"Creatures Of Chaos" ft. Tyler Connolly	Creatures Of Chaos ft. Tyler Connolly	Weirdo
"Dancer in the Dark"	Hide from the Sun Limited Edition	Hide from the Sun
"Dark Summer"	Rise Vinyl Edition; Dark Summer (Rise Outtakes)	Rise
"Days"	Heartbreaker/Days; Into Special Edition	Into
"Drum"	Dark Matters Limited Edition Bonus Track	Dark Matters
"Elephant's Weight"	Vain elämää	—
"Everything You Say"	B-Side of Funeral Song; Dead Letters Limited Edition	Dead Letters
"Fireflies" ft. Charles Ans	Fireflies	Rise
"Funeral Song (The Resurrection)"	B-Side of Funeral Song; Dead Letters USA/UK Edition	Dead Letters
"Holy Grail"	Holy Grail	—
"If You Ever"	B-Side of Funeral Song; Dead Letters USA/UK Edition	Dead Letters
"In the Shadows of Ukraine" (with Kalush Orchestra)	In the Shadows of Ukraine	Dead Letters
"Jezebel" (with Desmond Child)	Desmond Child Rocks The Parthenon: The Live Concert Album	Rise
"Justify (Brown Version)"	Black Roses iTunes Bonus Track	Black Roses
"Kun Nuoruus Päättyy" (with Robin Packalen)	Chillaa Deluxe Edidtion	—
"Livin' in a World Without You" (with Desmond Child)	Desmond Child Rocks The Parthenon: The Live Concert Album	Black Roses
"Mysteria"	Mysteria; The Rasmus Tour Edition Bonus Tracks	The Rasmus
"October & April" (featuring Anette Olzon)	October & April	Best of 2001-2009
"October & April" (featuring Lena Katina)	October & April	Best of 2001-2009
"Omen"	Rise Vinyl Edition''; Dark Summer (Rise Outtakes)	Rise
"Open My Eyes"	Hide from the Sun UK Edition	Hide from the Sun
"Play Dead"	B-Side of Madness; Into Special Edition	Into
"Rakkauslaulu"	1st Hell of a Collection	Peep
"S.O.S."	Come Together: A Tribute to Bravo	—
"Say It Again" (with Bad Wolves)	Say It Again ft. The Rasmus; Die About It Deluxe Edition	—
"Since You've Been Gone"	B-Side of First Day of My Life UK Edition; Dead Letters Limited Edition	Dead Letters
"Supernova"	Dark Matters Limited Edition Bonus Track	Dark Matters
"Teardrops"	B-Side of Paradise; Dark Matters Limited Edition Bonus Track	Dark Matters
"Trigger"	Hide from the Sun Japan Edition	Hide from the Sun
"Ufolaulu"	B-Side of Ice	Playboys
"Used to Feel Before"	B-Side of Madness; Into Special Edition	Into
"Venomous Moon" (featuring Apocalyptica)	Venomous Moon; Rise Vinyl Edition	Rise
"What Ever"	B-Side of In My Life; Dead Letters USA/UK Edition	Dead Letters
"Yesterday You Threw Away Tomorrow"	Black Roses Bonus Track	Black Roses
