= Best of The Rasmus 2001–2009 =

Greatest hits album by The Rasmus
- Released: November 28, 2009
- Label: Playground Music
- Producer: Various

The Rasmus chronology
Black Roses (2008)	Best of The Rasmus 2001–2009 (2009)	The Rasmus (2012)

Singles from Best of 2001–2009
- 1. "October & April" Released: 17 November 2009

Best of The Rasmus 2001–2009, also referred to as Best of.. 2001-2009 is a compilation album by the Finnish alternative rock band The Rasmus, it was released on November 2, 2009. The album contains the best songs between 2001 and 2009. While most of the songs were already released, it features a new unreleased song called "October & April" which features vocals by Anette Olzon from Nightwish. This song was recorded during the same time as the other songs from the band's latest studio album Black Roses, but wasn't included as it didn't follow the album concept.

"Open My Eyes", appearing in acoustic live version on this album, is a b-side of the single Shot and originally taken from the UK edition of the album Hide from the Sun (2005).

== Overview ==
Singer Lauri Ylönen about the album:

We felt it was time to sum up these past ten years. Eero said, let's call the album "This is how I spent my twenties"... No matter how stupid it sounded that is pretty much the truth. We went on this crazy rollercoaster ride, it has been an amazing time. We have travelled to more than 60 countries, from ..India.. to ..Siberia.., met thousands of fans all over the world and enthusiastic people working with our records. And when I look back on these last four records I feel very proud of them. We decided to include most of the singles to the album with a couple of our favorite album tracks, and the new song October & April.

== Track listing ==
No.	Title	Writer(s)	Length
1.	"In the Shadows"	Lauri Ylönen, Eero Heinonen, Pauli Rantasalmi, Aki Hakala	4:06
2.	"No Fear"	Ylönen, Heinonen, Rantasalmi, Hakala	4:07
3.	"Guilty (Us Mix)"	Ylönen, Heinonen, Rantasalmi, Hakala	3:44
4.	"October & April (feat. Anette Olzon)"	Ylönen	3:54
5.	"First Day of My Life"	Ylönen, Heinonen, Rantasalmi, Hakala	3:44
6.	"Livin' in a World Without You"	Ylönen, Rantasalmi, Desmond Child	3:50
7.	"F-F-F-Falling"	Ylönen, Heinonen, Rantasalmi, Hakala	3:52
8.	"Chill"	Ylönen, Heinonen, Rantasalmi, Hakala	4:13
9.	"Immortal"	Ylönen, Heinonen, Rantasalmi, Hakala	4:57
10.	"Justify"	Ylönen, Rantasalmi, Child, James Michael	4:26
11.	"Shot"	Ylönen, Heinonen, Rantasalmi, Hakala	4:18
12.	"Funeral Song"	Ylönen, Heinonen, Rantasalmi, Hakala	3:21
13.	"Ghost of Love"	Ylönen, Rantasalmi, Child, Harry Sommerdahl	3:17
14.	"Open My Eyes (Acoustic Version)"	Ylönen, Heinonen, Rantasalmi, Hakala	3:23
15.	"In My Life"	Ylönen, Heinonen, Rantasalmi, Hakala	4:02
16.	"Ten Black Roses"	Ylönen, Rantasalmi, Child	3:54
17.	"Sail Away"	Ylönen, Heinonen, Rantasalmi, Hakala	3:49

== Personnel ==
- Lauri Ylönen – vocals
- Eero Heinonen – bass
- Pauli Rantasalmi – guitar
- Aki Hakala – drums

== Charts ==
Chart (2009)	Peak position
Finnish Albums Chart	8
