= Hell of a Collection =

Compilation album by the Rasmus
- Released: 2001 (re-released in 2004)
- Length: 61:33
- Label: Warner Music Finland
- Producer: Various (See below)

The Rasmus chronology
Hell of a Tester (1998)	Hell of a Collection (2001)	Into (2001)

Hell of a Collection (stylized Hellofacollection, as one word) is the first compilation album by the Finnish band The Rasmus, released in 2001 by Warner Music Finland.

The band recorded it when they still were "Rasmus" (later they changed their name from "Rasmus" to "The Rasmus"). It is the first album that they made since Janne Heiskanen, the previous drummer who left the band, was replaced by Aki Hakala in 1998. It is composed of eighteen songs, nearly all of which are revamped versions of songs from their previous three albums. The exceptions are the final track, "Liquid" (Demo), which is a demo tape of their hit song "Liquid", and the songs "F-F-F-Falling" and "Chill" which were the first new songs released after Aki replaced Janne.

"Rakkauslaulu" (Lovesong) is a B-Side of the single 1st (1995), and a non-album song.

"Life 705" was originally released on the band's debut album Peep in 1996. A new version was made in 1999 and is available on the single "Swimming with the Kids".

Except for all the revamped and remixed versions of songs, the album did not contain any new tracks.

In 2004 the album was re-released with a different track list excluding the two songs from Into.

== New logo ==
The band changed their logo (which earlier just said "Rasmus") to a new one with flames. This is the first release where their new logo appears on. It also appears on the album Into and all its singles. The logo was not used a long time though; in 2003 they changed it again to a "leaf" logo, which was used until their album, Black Roses.Later, in 2012, they changed it again to a "bars" logo, which was used in their most recent album The Rasmus and all its singles.

== Track listing ==
=== 2001 version ===
Tracks 1–2 written by Lauri Ylönen, Eero Heinonen, Pauli Rantasalmi and Aki Hakala. Tracks 3–18 written by Lauri Ylönen, Eero Heinonen, Pauli Rantasalmi and Janne Heiskanen (except for number 12).

1. "F-F-F-Falling" (Swedish remix) – 3:52 (later released on Into)
2. "Chill" – 4:13 (later released on Into)
3. "Liquid" – 4:17 (from the album Hell of a Tester)
4. "Every Day" – 3:18 (from the album Hell of a Tester)
5. "City of the Dead" – 3:22 (from the album Hell of a Tester)
6. "Help Me Sing" – 3:24 (from the album Hell of a Tester)
7. "Playboys" – 2:57 (from the album Playboys)
8. "Blue" – 3:14 (from the album Playboys)
9. "Ice" – 2:45 (from the album Playboys)
10. "Sophia" – 2:42 (from the album Playboys)
11. "Wicked Moments" – 2:56 (from the album Playboys)
12. "Ghostbusters" (Ray Parker Jr.) – 3:35 (from the album Peep)
13. "Funky Jam" – 2:11 (from the album Peep)
14. "Myself" – 3:53 (from the album Peep)
15. "P.S." – 2:56 (from the album Peep)
16. "Rakkauslaulu" – 3:35 (from the single 1st)
17. "Life 705" (version '99) – 5:42 (from the single Swimming with the Kids)
18. "Liquid" (demo) – 3:11

== Producers ==
- Track 1–2 produced by Mikael Nord and Martin Hansen
- Track 3 produced by The Rasmus and The Nose
- Track 4–6 produced by The Rasmus and Teja Kotilainen
- Track 7–11 produced by The Rasmus and Illka Herkman
- Track 12–16 produced by The Rasmus and Teja Kotilainen
- Track 17 produced by The Rasmus

== 2004 version ==
1. "City of the Dead" – 3:22 (from the album Hell of a Tester)
2. "Liquid" – 4:17 (from the album Hell of a Tester)
3. "Every Day" – 3:18 (from the album Hell of a Tester)
4. "Swimming with the Kids" – 3:30 (from the album Hell of a Tester)
5. "Wellwell" – 3:21 (from the album Playboys)
6. "Help Me Sing" – 3:24 (from the album Hell of a Tester)
7. "Playboys" – 2:57 (from the album Playboys)
8. "Blue" – 3:14 (from the album Playboys)
9. "Ice" – 2:45 (from the album Playboys)
10. "Sophia" – 2:42 (from the album Playboys)
11. "Wicked Moments" – 2:56 (from the album Playboys)
12. "Ghostbusters" (Ray Parker Jr.) – 3:35 (from the album Peep)
13. "Funky Jam" – 2:11 (from the album Peep)
14. "Myself" – 3:53 (from the album Peep)
15. "P.S." – 2:56 (from the album Peep)
16. "Rakkauslaulu" – 3:35 (from the single 1st)
17. "Life 705" (version '99) – 5:42 (from the single Swimming with the Kids)
18. "Liquid" (demo) – 3:11

== Producers ==
- Track 1 produced by The Rasmus and Teja Kotilainen
- Track 2 produced by The Rasmus and The Nose
- Track 3–6 produced by The Rasmus and Teja Kotilainen
- Track 7–11 produced by The Rasmus and Illka Herkman
- Track 12–16 produced by The Rasmus and Teja Kotilainen
- Track 17 produced by The Rasmus

== Charts and certifications ==
=== Weekly charts ===
Chart (2001)	Peak position
Finnish Albums (Suomen virallinen lista)	2

=== Year-end charts ===
Chart (2001)	Position
Finnish Albums (Suomen virallinen lista)	14

=== Certifications ===
Region	Certification	Certified units/sales
Finland (Musiikkituottajat)	Platinum	50,908
