= Livin' in a World Without You =

"Livin' in a World without You"

Single by the Rasmus

from the album Black Roses
- Released: September 10, 2008 Scandinavia; September 12 Germany, Austria, Switzerland; September 15 International
- Recorded: September 2007 – April 2008
- Genre: Alternative metal, symphonic rock
- Length: 3:50
- Label: Playground Music
- Songwriter(s): Lauri Ylönen, Pauli Rantasalmi, Desmond Child
- Producer(s): Desmond Child, Harry Sommerdahl

The Rasmus singles chronology
"Keep Your Heart Broken" (2006)	"Livin' in a World without You" (2008)	"Justify" (2009)

Livin' in a World Without You is a song by Finnish rock band the Rasmus and the first single from their seventh studio album, Black Roses. It is also first track on the album. The single was released on 10 September 2008, and was available in a variety of formats. It was performed for the first time live at the 'NRJ in the Park' festival in Berlin on 5 July 2008.

A music video for the song, produced by Nicolas Fronda, was recorded on 3 July in Stockholm and premiered on the band's web site.

== Track listing ==
CD single

1. "Livin' in a World Without You" – 3:50
2. "Livin' in a World Without You" (Acoustic Version) – 3:43
3. "You Got It Wrong" – 3:17
4. "Livin' in a World Without You" (Video)

Remixes Promo

1. "Livin In A World Without You" (Jorg Schmid Remix) - 5:15
2. "Livin In A World Without You" (Milan East Remix) - 3:53
3. "Livin In A World Without You" (Jorg Schmid Radio Edit) - 3:06
4. "Livin In A World Without You" (Original Radio Edit) - 3:14

== Charts ==
=== Weekly charts ===
Chart (2008–09)	Peak position
Austria (Ö3 Austria Top 40)	26
CIS Airplay (TopHit)	32
Finland (Suomen virallinen lista)	1
Germany (GfK)	14
Mexico Anglo (Monitor Latino)	8
Russia Airplay (TopHit)	39
Switzerland (Schweizer Hitparade)	78
Venezuela Pop Rock (Record Report)	17

=== Year-end charts ===
Chart (2008)	Position
CIS (TopHit)	147
Russia Airplay (TopHit)	83

== See also ==
- Black Roses
