= Jezebel (The Rasmus song) =

2022 single by the Rasmus

Single by The Rasmus

from the album Rise
- Released: 18 January 2022
- Length: 3:10
- Label: Playground
- Songwriters: Lauri Ylönen; Desmond Child
- Producer: Desmond Child

The Rasmus singles chronology
"Venomous Moon" (2021)	"Jezebel" (2022)	"Rise" (2022)

Music video
- "Jezebel" on YouTube

Eurovision Song Contest 2022 entry
- Country: Finland
- Artist: The Rasmus
- Language: English
- Composers: Lauri Ylönen; Desmond Child
- Lyricists: Lauri Ylönen; Desmond Child

Finals performance
- Semi-final result: 7th
- Semi-final points: 162
- Final result: 21st
- Final points: 38

Entry chronology
- ◄ "Dark Side" (2021)
- "Cha Cha Cha" (2023) ►

"Jezebel" is a song by Finnish rock band The Rasmus, released as a single on 18 January 2022. It was co-written and produced by lead singer Lauri Ylönen and Desmond Child. The song represented Finland at the Eurovision Song Contest 2022, held in Turin, Italy, in May 2022, opening the second semi-final on 12 May. It won the 2022 edition of Finland's annual Eurovision song selection competition, Uuden Musiikin Kilpailu, on 26 February 2022 with a total of 310 points. The single reached number four in Finland.

== Background ==
Ylönen said the song is "about a girl who takes what she wants, without asking. A free spirit", with Child describing it as "an homage, a tribute, to the strong women of today, who own their bodies, who are in charge of their sensuality, their sexuality, and who are determined to be an equal". The band had previously worked with Desmond Child on their 2008 album Black Roses, and called it "awesome" to work with him again, saying he "knows how to put a hit song together". The song title references Jezebel, a Biblical figure who was the Queen of Israel.

== Track listing ==
Digital download; streaming
No.	Title	Length
1.	"Jezebel"	3:10

Digital download; streaming; – Remixed
No.	Title	Length
1.	"Jezebel" (2Icons Remix)	3:03
2.	"Jezebel" (TOON Remix)	2:51
3.	"Jezebel"	3:10

== Charts ==
Chart performance for "Jezebel"
Chart (2022)	Peak position
Czech Republic Airplay (ČNS IFPI)	5
Finland (Suomen virallinen lista)	4
Lithuania (AGATA)	24
Sweden Heatseeker (Sverigetopplistan)	7
UK Singles Downloads (OCC)	34
UK Rock & Metal (OCC)	15
