= Rise (The Rasmus album) =

2022 Rasmus album

Studio album by The Rasmus
- Released: 23 September 2022
- Recorded: 2020–2022
- Length: 51:49
- Label: Playground Music Scandinavia
- Producer: Desmond Child, Joshua

The Rasmus chronology
Dark Matters (2017)	Rise (2022)	Weirdo (2025)

Singles from Rise
- 1. "Jezebel" Released: 18 January 2022; 2. "Rise" Released: 10 June 2022; 3. "Live and Never Die" Released: 23 September 2022; 4. "Fireflies" Released: 31 March 2023

Rise is the tenth album by the Finnish rock band The Rasmus, released on 23 September 2022. It is their first album after five years of inactivity, as a continuation of their previous album Dark Matters (2017).

== Background ==
Following the Dark Matters tour, the band held a series of concerts to celebrate the 15th anniversary of the release of their breakthrough album Dead Letters. Before the outbreak of the COVID-19 pandemic, they released the heavily pop-influenced "Holy Grail". Subsequently, two more songs were released during the pandemic, "Bones" in early 2021 and "Venomous Moon" at the end of the year, another collaboration with Apocalyptica. They have previously collaborated on "Life Burns!" and "Bittersweet".

At the beginning of 2022, the band's founder and lead guitarist Pauli Rantasalmi announced his departure. Emilia "Emppu" Suhonen was announced as his replacement, adding a female member to the line-up. The band later competed in the Eurovision Song Contest 2022 with "Jezebel", after winning the Finnish national selection. At Eurovision, the band qualified for the final by finishing in 7th place in their semi-final, and ultimately finished in 21st place. According to the band's fans, "Jezebel" is reminiscent of the band's peak of popularity between 2003 and 2008, which they attributed to the involvement of producer Desmond Child, with whom the Black Roses album was recorded in 2008. The album's title track, "Rise", was released on 10 June 2022.

== Track listing ==
Rise track listing
No.	Title	Length
1.	"Live and Never Die"	3:55
2.	"Rise"	3:54
3.	"Fireflies"	3:24
4.	"Be Somebody"	4:08
5.	"Odyssey"	2:49
6.	"Jezebel"	3:10
7.	"Endless Horizon"	3:46
8.	"Clouds"	3:17
9.	"Written in Blood"	3:22
10.	"Evil"	5:00
Total length:		36:44

Vinyl Edition
No.	Title	Length
11.	"Venomous Moon"	3:45
12.	"Bones"	3:48
13.	"Dark Summer"	3:14
14.	"Omen"	4:18
Total length:		15:05

== Personnel ==
The Rasmus

- Lauri Ylönen – lead and backing vocals
- Eero Heinonen – bass (except Live and Never Die)
- Pauli Rantasalmi – guitar (Fireflies, Be Somebody, Odyssey, Endless Horizon, Clouds, Written in Blood, Evil)
- Emilia "Emppu" Suhonen – guitar (Live and Never Die)
- Aki Hakala – drums

Apocalyptica (feat. on Venomous Moon)

- Eicca Toppinen – cello
- Paavo Lötjönen – cello
- Perttu Kivilaakso – cello

Session musicians

- Janne Puurtinen – grand piano (Omen)
- Miguel Comas – guitar (Rise, Jezebel)
- David Santos – bass (Live and Never Die)
- Clay Perry – keyboards (Live and Never Die, Rise)
- Randy Cantor – keyboards, organ (Rise, Jezebel)
- Andy Reiner – violin (Rise)
- Joy Adams – cello (Rise)
- Rachel Grimes – cello (Evil)
- Neil Grimes – piano, effects (Evil)
- Justin Benlolo – backing vocals (Live and Never Die, Rise, Jezebel)
- Chris Willis – backing vocals (Live and Never Die)
- Gabe Page – backing vocals (Live and Never Die)
- Leo Dante – backing vocals (Live and Never Die)
- Turner Jalomo – backing vocals (Live and Never Die)

== Charts ==
Chart performance for Rise
Chart (2022)	Peak position
Finnish Albums (Suomen virallinen lista)	4
German Albums (Offizielle Top 100)	34
Swiss Albums (Schweizer Hitparade)	37
UK Album Downloads (OCC)	39
UK Independent Albums (OCC)	40
