= Shot (song) =

Single by The Rasmus

from the album Hide from the Sun
- Released: March 30, 2006
- Recorded: 2005 at Nord Studios in Stockholm, Sweden
- Genre: Alternative rock
- Length: 4:17
- Label: Playground Music
- Songwriters: Aki Hakala, Eero Heinonen, Pauli Rantasalmi, Lauri Ylönen
- Producers: Mikael Nord; Martin Hansen

The Rasmus singles chronology
"Sail Away" (2006)	"Shot" (2006)	"Keep Your Heart Broken" (2006)

Shot is a song by the Finnish alternative rock band The Rasmus, originally released on the band's sixth studio album Hide from the Sun on September 2, 2006. The single was released on March 30, 2006.

This is the last single to be released from Hide from the Sun. The song "Immortal" was later released as a music video, but there was no single.

The song reached #6 on the Finland Singles Chart.

== Enhanced CD track listing ==
Maxi Single Enhanced CD

21.04.2006, Playground Music Scandinavia Catalogue Number: PGMCDM 65 Shot see the booklet and inlay's scans

1. "Shot"
2. "Keep Your Heart Broken" [live]
3. "Shot" [live]
4. "Open My Eyes" [acoustic]
5. "The Rasmus Software Player Whit:
  - Shot(Video)
  - Shot - Making of (Video)
  - Photo Gallery
  - Screensavers
  - Extra Video Material
  - Web Links

CD Single

1. "Shot"
2. "Shot" (Star City Remix)

Shot Mexican promo edition

2006, Playground Music Scandinavia - Universal Music Catalogue Number: 201740 Shot Mexico see the booklet and inlay's scans

1. "Shot
2. "Guilty" (Live in Mexico City 18.11.2004)
3. "The One I Love" (Live in Mexico City 18.11.2004)

Shot English digital edition

24.04.2006, Playground Music Scandinavia Shot

1. "Shot
2. "Keep Your Heart" Broken (Live)
3. "Shot" (Live)
4. "Last Generation" (Live - UK exclusive)

== Music video ==
The Rasmus in the music video of "Shot"

In the video for "Shot" (directed by Sandra Marschner), the band seems to be in outer space, singing on a desert-like planet. The video consists of mainly alternating between close-ups of each band member and different angles of the whole band. Fast zooms and camera angle changes are used in parts of the video. At one point, there is a close-up of singer Lauri Ylönen's eye and a comet flickers across his iris. This is very similar to a part of the video for "First Day of My Life", in which a close up of Lauri's eye is seen with a reflection of a racing track.

== Charts ==
Chart (2007)	Peak position
Austria (Ö3 Austria Top 40)	49
Finland (Suomen virallinen lista)	6
Germany (GfK)	46
Netherlands (Single Top 100)	91
