= No Fear (The Rasmus song) =

Single by The Rasmus

from the album Hide from the Sun
- Released: August 29, 2005; September 5, 2005 (UK)
- Recorded: 2005 at Nord Studios in Stockholm, Sweden
- Genre: Alternative metal, alternative rock
- Length: 4:07
- Label: Playground Music; Island Records (UK)
- Songwriters: Aki Hakala, Eero Heinonen, Pauli Rantasalmi, Lauri Ylönen
- Producers: Mikael Nord, Martin Hansen

The Rasmus singles chronology
"Guilty" (2004)	"No Fear" (2005)	"Sail Away" (2005)

"No Fear" is a song by the Finnish alternative rock band The Rasmus, originally released on the band's sixth studio album Hide from the Sun on September 2, 2005. The single was the first (and most successful) to be released from the album.

Following its release on August 29, 2005, the single achieved some chart success across Europe, as well as topping the Israeli singles chart. The music video also reached No. 1 on MTV Europe's Nordic chart list "UpNorth".

== Single track listing ==
- CD single - International
1. "No Fear"
2. "No Fear" (Fearless Remix)
- CD maxi single
1. "No Fear"
2. "Immortal"
3. "No Fear" (Vrenna Remix)
- CD single - UK
1. "No Fear"
2. "No Fear" (Freelance Hellraiser Remix)
- EP - UK
1. "No Fear" – 4:07
2. "Immortal" – 4:57
3. "Dancer in the Dark" – 3:28
4. "No Fear" (Vrenna Remix) – 3:40
5. "The Rasmus Software Player:
  - No Fear (Video) - 3:57
  - No Fear (Making Of) - 8:02
  - Photo Gallery
  - Extra video material
  - Web Links

== Music video ==
The music video for "No Fear" was directed by Jörn Heitmann in Berlin, Germany the same year. Jörn Heitmann has also directed many of Rammstein's videos.

Lauri Ylönen in the music video for "No Fear"

The video depicts a girl with an apparent obsession with butterflies. She follows them out of her bedroom and sleepwalks across roofs, and through streets. The girl eventually comes to a roof of glass panes and falls through them into the building. It is unclear whether the girl has died or not, and she appears to end up in a garden with a bed situated in the middle, surrounded by butterflies and flowers. While she is sleepwalking, a swarm of butterflies become animated from pictures behind where the band are performing, and other places around the building.

== Charts ==
Chart (2005)	Peak position
Austria Singles Top 75	16
Czech Republic Radio Top 100	7
Dutch Top 40	18
Finland Singles Top 20	1
France Singles Top 100	41
Germany Singles Top 100	13
Hungarian Singles Chart	4
Ireland Singles Top 50	48
Israel Singles Top 40	1
Sweden Singles Top 60	23
Swiss Singles Top 100	44
UK Singles Top 75	43
