= Dark Matters (The Rasmus album) =

Studio album by the Rasmus
- Released: 6 October 2017
- Length: 48:35
- Label: Playground Music Scandinavia
- Producer: The Family

The Rasmus chronology
The Rasmus (2012)	Dark Matters (2017)	Rise (2022)

Singles from Dark Matters
- 1. "Paradise" Released: March 31, 2017; 2. "Silver Night" Released: August 25, 2017; 3. "Nothing" Released: September 15, 2017; 4. "Wonderman" Released: September 22, 2017; 5. "Something in the Dark" Released: September 29, 2017

Dark Matters is the ninth album by the Finnish rock band the Rasmus, which was released in Finland on 8 October 2017. It is their first album after five years of inactivity, as a continuation of their previous album The Rasmus (2012).

== Background ==
Dark Matters is The Rasmus's first album in eight years to be released by Playground Music, after Best of The Rasmus 2001–2009. The album was originally announced for a 22 September release, but was delayed to 2 October.

A music video for "Wonderman" was directed by Jesse Haaja and premiered on YouTube on 26 September 2017.

On 1 December, of the same year the official video of "Silver Night" directed by Vesa Manninen was released, in which they show us a solitary robot in a house. It is the first official video where the members of the band do not appear.

On 26 January 2018, a new official video of The Rasmus is released: "Nothing", which was directed by the bassist of the group Eero Heinonen.

== Track listing ==
All tracks are written by Lauri Ylönen, Pauli Rantasalmi, Joy Deb, Linnea Deb and Anton Hård.

No.	Title	Length
1.	"Paradise"	4:13
2.	"Something in the Dark"	3:30
3.	"Wonderman"	3:23
4.	"Nothing"	3:42
5.	"Empire"	3:32
6.	"Crystalline"	3:14
7.	"Black Days"	3:36
8.	"Silver Night"	3:34
9.	"Delirium"	3:22
10.	"Dragons into Dreams"	3:33
Total length:		35:39

Limited Edition bonus track
No.	Title	Length
11.	"Teardrops"	3:15
12.	"Supernova"	3:21
13.	"Drum"	3:16
14.	"Holy Grail"	3:04
Total length:		12:56

== Personnel ==
The Rasmus

- Lauri Ylönen – Vocals
- Eero Heinonen – Bass
- Pauli Rantasalmi – Guitar
- Aki Hakala – Drums

== Charts ==
Weekly chart performance for Dark Matters
Chart (2017)	Peak position
Austrian Albums (Ö3 Austria)	47
Finnish Albums (Suomen virallinen lista)	7
German Albums (Offizielle Top 100)	61
Swiss Albums (Schweizer Hitparade)	52
