= F-F-F-Falling =

2001 single by the Rasmus

Single by the Rasmus

from the album Into
- Released: April 2, 2001
- Recorded: 2000–2001
- Studio: Nord (Stockholm, Sweden)
- Genre: Alternative rock
- Length: 3:52
- Label: Playground Music
- Songwriter(s): The Rasmus
- Producer(s): Mikael Nord, Martin Hansen

The Rasmus singles chronology
"Swimming with the Kids" (1999)	"F-F-F-Falling" (2001)	"Chill" (2001)

"F-F-F-Falling", sometimes shortened to "Falling", is a song by Finnish rock band the Rasmus, originally released on the band's fourth album Into on 29 October 2001. The single was released on 2 April 2001 by the record label Playground Music. It was the first single from the album Into and features the track "F-F-F-Falling" plus a movie in MPEG-format, named The Rasmus at Work, showing how the band made the album Into. The single went number one on the Finnish Singles Chart upon its release; before the band released "In the Shadows" in 2003, "F-F-F-Falling" was their biggest hit.

== Comments from the band ==
=== Eero Heinonen (bassist) ===
"This song has been selected to become the first single, because it's something special. People think 'What's that? That doesn't sound like The Rasmus!' when they hear the song."

=== Lauri Ylönen (singer-songwriter) ===
"The first sentence, about not going to school on Monday. That's true, because Monday was the day to practice our new songs."

== Music video ==
The music video for "F-F-F-Falling" was shot in Vantaa, Finland the same year. The video shows different clips of the band in a studio and a girl who doesn't like to go to school. This relates to the lyrics "I don't go to school every Monday. I've got my reason to sleep. Don't you tell me how I should be".

It also shows members of the band dressed in beach-style clothes, and singer Lauri Ylönen wearing skater pads while playing the song in an apartment that looks like a recording studio. In the video the girl meets a friend (also a girl) at a train station. The girls spend a lot of time together listening to music in a shop (that appears to be the song that The Rasmus plays in the apartment) and riding on the bus. Later they change clothes in the same room, go to the toilet in the street, dance everywhere, and kiss in a car, to the point that they kiss in the bed of the first girl, leading to them sleeping together. In the morning, the girl thinks about what she has done and looks like she regrets her actions.

== Track listings ==
Finnish CD single

1. "F-F-F-Falling" (single edit)
2. The Rasmus at Work (movie)

German CD1

1. "F-F-F-Falling" – 3:53
2. "Smash" – 3:43
3. "Can't Stop Me" – 2:51

German CD2

1. "F-F-F-Falling" – 3:53
2. "Smash" – 3:43

== Charts ==
Chart (2001)	Peak position
Finland (Suomen virallinen lista)	1

== Certifications and sales ==
Region	Certification	Certified units/sales
Finland (Musiikkituottajat)	Platinum	10,926

== Reissues ==
"F-F-F-Falling" also appears as a remixed version (US Remix) on following releases:

- Dead Letters – Finnish edition (2003)
- Dead Letters – USA/UK edition (2004)
- Dead Letters – Japanese edition (2004)
