= Sail Away (The Rasmus song) =

Single by The Rasmus

from the album Hide from the Sun
- Released: October 25, 2005
- Recorded: 2005 at Nord Studios in Stockholm, Sweden
- Genre: Alternative rock Symphonic rock Soft rock
- Length: 3:48
- Label: Playground Music
- Songwriters: Aki Hakala, Eero Heinonen, Pauli Rantasalmi, Lauri Ylönen
- Producers: Mikael Nord; Martin Hansen

The Rasmus singles chronology
"No Fear" (2005)	"Sail Away" (2005)	"Shot" (2006)

"Sail Away" is a song by the Finnish rock band The Rasmus, originally released on the band's sixth studio album Hide from the Sun on September 2, 2005. The song was written by the lead singer Lauri Ylönen. Sail away was 2nd on the United States singles list in 2005.

The music video went #1 at MTV Latino in March 2006. It has also been a popular video on many other music channels in Europe.

The single was released on October 25, 2005 by Playground Music Scandinavia. The cover of the maxi single is different from the original version. The maxi single contains the PC-program "The Rasmus Player". The image in the adjacent box is the original cover. It is the second single from the album Hide from the Sun.

"Sail Away" is a slow, melodic song featuring the violin. The strings were arranged by Jesper Nordenström and performed by Jakob Ruthberg, Anna S. Wallgren, Roland Kress, and Christian Bergqvist.

== Single track listing ==
CD-single

1. "Sail Away" – 3:48
2. "Sail Away" (Benztown Mixdown) – 5:34

Maxi single

1. "Sail Away" – 3:48
2. "Sail Away" [acoustic]
3. "Sail Away" (Benztown Chillout Remix)
4. "Lucifer's Angel" – 4:01
5. "The Rasmus Software Player:
  - Sail away - music video
  - Photo Gallery From the making of the video in Latvia.
  - Extra video material

== Music video ==
The music video to "Sail Away" was shot on a beach in Riga, Latvia on 19th & 20 September 2005. It was directed by the young Berlin team Mathias Vielsäcker and Christoph Mangler.

In the video, some black butterflies fly away to the sea after singer Lauri Ylönen is shown walking slowly down a cold-looking beach, singing. He sees a man coming up onto the shore carrying an empty bird-cage and he carries on walking. He sees another man, digging a grave, and a woman (supposedly his wife) standing near him. The woman takes some pills, probably to commit suicide and jerks her head in Ylönen's direction. Ylönen keeps walking, finds a crow's feather on the sand in front of him, and picks it up. As he is walking, he sees some more odd happenings, such as two children dancing around a wooden sculpture (possibly a pyre) in gas masks. The pyre has dolls in coffins hung on it. Ylönen enters a shack as a sand-storm approaches the shore. There, he finds the rest of the band playing the song. He waits a few seconds and after the storm reaches the shack, he resumes playing. Aki Hakala (drummer) and Eero Heinonen (bassist) both turn into sand-figures. At the end of the video, Hakala's head and Heinonen's arms both fall off.

== Charts ==
=== Weekly charts ===
Chart (2005–07)	Peak position
Austria (Ö3 Austria Top 40)	53
Belgium (Ultratip Bubbling Under Flanders)	18
CIS Airplay (TopHit)	28
Czech Republic (Rádio – Top 100)	21
Finland (Suomen virallinen lista)	2
Germany (GfK)	34
Hungary (Editors' Choice Top 40)	22
Italy (FIMI)	46
Netherlands (Single Top 100)	74
Russia Airplay (TopHit)	22
Sweden (Sverigetopplistan)	58
Switzerland (Schweizer Hitparade)	51

=== Year-end charts ===
Chart (2006)	Position
CIS (Tophit)	62
Russia Airplay (TopHit)	76
