= The Rasmus (album) =

Studio album by the Rasmus
- Released: 18 April 2012
- Recorded: 2011
- Length: 44:59
- Label: Universal Music
- Producer: Martin Hansen

The Rasmus chronology
Best of 2001–2009 (2009)	The Rasmus (2012)	Dark Matters (2017)

Singles from The Rasmus
- 1. "I'm a Mess" Released: 5 March 2012; 2. "Stranger" Released: 15 May 2012; 3. "Mysteria" Released: 24 September 2012

The Rasmus is the eighth studio album by the Finnish rock band the Rasmus, which was released in Finland on 18 April 2012.

The album received two EMMA (Finnish Grammy) awards for Best Album Cover and Best Music Video (for "I'm a Mess").

== Background ==
After Lauri Ylönen finished touring for his debut solo album, the band entered the studio in the summer of 2011 to begin writing and recording their eighth studio album. On 25 February 2012 the Rasmus debuted the lead single "I'm a Mess" at the finals of UMK in Finland. The song was released on 5 March 2012. In February the band announced that the upcoming album would be self-titled, and would be released on April 18.

The Rasmus was re-issued in Autumn 2012, featuring the new track "Mysteria", which was also released as a single.

== Musical style and influences ==
Starting on Autumn of 2009, Lauri Ylönen wrote songs with Pauli Rantasalmi in Singapore, with the intention of composing the album, but ended in a more electronical form, songs that were added into the Lauri Ylönen's debut solo album New World, an album with Daft Punk production influences. An electronic sound can be noted in the album. Lauri Ylönen Said that they wanted to go back to the sound from the Into era, while the bassist Eero Heinonen, said: "Some songs from the next album would be ballads, other songs would have strong realist lyrics, but i'm sure that the fans will love it".

== Singles ==
The first single released from the album, "I'm a Mess", was first heard at the live final of Finland's national selection process for the Eurovision song contest as a guest performance act, and was released as a single on March 5. In May, the band released a self-made music video for the song "Somewhere" with clips of them in the studio, in concert, and in a normal day. "Stranger" was released as the second single on 15 May 2012 in Finland, this was confirmed by guitarist Pauli Rantasalmi while he was responding to fan's questions in Radio Nova on 15 April. The video for Stranger was filmed in Singapore, and depicts Lauri dressed as a king and finding himself as a stranger in a new time.

A tour edition of the album was released on 9 November, with the 10 previous tracks and five bonus tracks, including the single "Mysteria", released on 24 September.

== Tour ==
On 23 February, the band announced a tour that began in May, with 11 shows in Europe, starting in Stockholm on 7 May. Their supporting band was the British band InMe. As said by Universal, a total of 7 shows were added for October in Finland. New dates were added for Autumn at the end of the May Tour.

== Track listing ==
All Music and lyrics composed by the Rasmus

No.	Title	Length
1.	"Stranger"	3:59
2.	"I'm a Mess"	4:12
3.	"It's Your Night"	3:37
4.	"Save Me Once Again"	4:36
5.	"Someone's Gonna Light You Up"	3:44
6.	"End of the Story"	4:10
7.	"You Don't See Me"	3:13
8.	"Somewhere"	5:29
9.	"Friends Don't Do Like That"	4:27
10.	"Sky"	3:59

iTunes bonus track
No.	Title	Length
11.	"Stranger" (Acoustic)	3:36

Amazon bonus tracks
No.	Title	Length
11.	"I'm a Mess" (Acoustic)	3:45
12.	"Stranger" (Acoustic)	3:36

Japanese bonus track
No.	Title	Length
11.	"Mess-Avalanche" (Revamped by Pauli Rantasalmi)	4:03

The Rasmus Tour Edition bonus tracks
No.	Title	Length
11.	"Mysteria"	3:34
12.	"Stranger" (Felix Zenger Beatbox Remix)	3:15
13.	"Stranger Wanderer" (remix by Dj Tuhat)	3:29
14.	"Sky" (Piano by Aynsley Green)	3:50
15.	"Save Me Once Again" (Piano by Aynsley Green)	2:36

== Personnel ==
The Rasmus

- Lauri Ylönen – vocals
- Eero Heinonen – bass guitar
- Pauli Rantasalmi – guitar
- Aki Hakala – drums

Production

- Martin Hansen – producer, recording, mixing
- Svante Forsbäck – mastering
- Takayuki Nakazawa – installation
- Musuta Ltd. – design
- Hiroshi Manaka – photography

== Charts ==
Weekly chart performance for The Rasmus
Chart (2012)	Peak position
Austrian Albums (Ö3 Austria)	23
Finnish Albums (Suomen virallinen lista)	3
German Albums (Offizielle Top 100)	26
Swiss Albums (Schweizer Hitparade)	46

== DVDs ==
Cover of Live 2012/Volume II

The Rasmus released two concert DVDs of the tour. Live 2012/Mysteria documented the early tour; it was released on 11 October 2012 and was sold at the later shows. Live 2012/Volume II contained footage of the later tour and other material; it was released 3 December 2013.
