= Justify (The Rasmus song) =

Single by The Rasmus

from the album Black Roses
- Released: January 30, 2009
- Recorded: September 2007 – April 2008
- Genre: Symphonic rock
- Label: Playground Music
- Songwriter(s): Lauri Ylönen, Pauli Rantasalmi, Desmond Child James Michael
- Producer(s): Desmond Child, Harry Sommerdahl

The Rasmus singles chronology
"Livin' in a World Without You" (2008)	"Justify" (2009)	"October & April" (2009)

"Justify" is the second single released from the 2008 album, Black Roses by the Finnish rock band, the Rasmus.

The song is a symphonic rock song (pehmorock or "plush rock" in Finnish.) The first demo for "Justify" was created in Los Angeles, California at both James Michael's and Desmond Child's studios in January 2007.

== Track list ==
1. "Justify"
2. "Yesterday You Threw Away Tomorrow"
3. "Justify (Brown Version)" (iTunes Bonus)

== Video ==
Lauri in the music video for "Justify"

The music video for the single was filmed on November 9, 2008. It begins with lead singer Lauri Ylönen confined to a chair. He starts to cry tears of black ink, which gradually flood the room throughout the video and seemingly drown him.

== Charts ==
Chart (2008–2009)	Peak position
Austria Singles Chart	61
German Singles Chart	56
Slovakia Airplay Chart	72
