= Heavy (Lauri Ylönen song) =

Single by Lauri Ylönen

from the album New World
- Released: February 25, 2011
- Recorded: September 2010
- Genre: Electropop
- Length: 4:02
- Label: Dynasty Recording
- Songwriter: Lauri Ylönen

Music video
- "Heavy" on YouTube

"Heavy" is the first single of Finnish singer Lauri Ylönen from his first solo album New World. The world premiere of the song was on 26 February 2011 with a digital release on 25 February.

== Track listing ==
No.	Title	Length
1.	"Heavy"	4:02

== Charts ==
Chart (2011)	Peak position
Finland (Suomen virallinen lista)	2
