= Weirdo (The Rasmus album) =

Studio album by the Rasmus
- Released: 12 September 2025
- Length: 32:36
- Label: Better Noise; Playground Music
- Producer: Desmond Child; Marti Frederiksen

The Rasmus chronology
Rise (2022)	Weirdo (2025)

Singles from Weirdo
- 1. "Rest in Pieces" Released: 24 October 2024; 2. "Creatures of Chaos" Released: 28 March 2025; 3. "Break These Chains" Released: 16 May 2025; 4. "Love Is a Bitch" Released: 11 July 2025; 5. "Weirdo" Released: 12 September 2025; 6. "Banksy" Released: 19 November 2025

Weirdo is the eleventh studio album by the Finnish rock band the Rasmus, released on 12 September 2025 by Better Noise Music and Playground Music Scandinavia.

== Singles ==
The album has had six of its ten songs released as singles.

- "Rest in Pieces"
- "Creatures of Chaos"
- "Break These Chains"
- "Love Is a Bitch"
- "Weirdo"
- "Banksy"

== Reception ==
Professional ratings
Review scores
Source	Rating
Kerrang!	3/5
Metal Hammer	3/5 stars

Kerrang! critic Steve Beebee concludes in his review that it has "long since made its point", noting that it "is the rescue vehicle you’ve spent the past 35 years waiting for."

== Track listing ==
No.	Title	Length
1.	"Creatures of Chaos"	3:20
2.	"Break These Chains" (featuring Niko Vilhelm)	3:44
3.	"Rest in Pieces"	2:56
4.	"Dead Ringer"	3:20
5.	"Weirdo" (featuring Lee Jennings)	2:58
6.	"Banksy"	2:10
7.	"Love Is a Bitch"	2:47
8.	"You Want it All"	4:03
9.	"Bad Things"	3:00
10.	"I'm Coming for You"	4:25
Total length:		32:40

== Personnel ==
Credits adapted from Tidal:

The Rasmus

- Lauri Ylönen – voice, background vocals, producer (track 2)
- Eero Heinonen – bass guitar, background vocals
- Emppu Suhonen – electric guitar, background vocals
- Aki Hakala – drum kit

Additional performing artists

- Leo Dante – background vocals (all tracks except track 8)
- Niko Vilhelm (of Blind Channel) – vocals (track 2)
- Lee Jennings (of the Funeral Portrait) – vocals (track 5)
- Justin Benlolo – background vocals (track 8)
- Chris Willis – background vocals (track 8)
- Nate Bass – background vocals (track 8)
- Mark Bass – background vocals (track 8)
- Simon Dumas – background vocals (track 8)
- Brandon Will – background vocals (track 8)
- Kieren Bass – background vocals (track 8)

Production

- Joseph McQueen – mixer, mastering engineer
- Evan Fredriksen – sound engineer
- Desmond Child – producer (all except track 3)
- Marti Frederiksen – producer (all except track 3)
- Alex Mattson – producer (track 3)

== Charts ==
Chart performance for Weirdo
Chart (2025)	Peak position
Austrian Albums (Ö3 Austria)	61
Finnish Albums (Suomen virallinen lista)	22
Swiss Albums (Schweizer Hitparade)	95
