= Finland in the Eurovision Song Contest 2022 =

- Eurovision Song Contest 2022
- Participating broadcaster: Yleisradio (Yle)
- Country: Finland
- Selection process: Uuden Musiikin Kilpailu 2022
- Selection date: 26 February 2022

Competing entry
- Song: "Jezebel"
- Artist: The Rasmus
- Songwriters: Lauri Ylönen; Desmond Child

Placement
- Semi-final result: Qualified (7th, 162 points)
- Final result: 21st, 38 points

Participation chronology

Finland was represented at the Eurovision Song Contest 2022 with the song "Jezebel" written by Lauri Ylönen and Desmond Child, and performed by The Rasmus. The Finnish participating broadcaster, Yleisradio (Yle), organised the national final Uuden Musiikin Kilpailu 2022 in order to select its entry for the contest. Seven entries were selected to compete in the national final on 26 February 2022, where the combination of votes from seven international jury groups and votes from the public selected the winner.

Finland was drawn to compete in the second semi-final of the Eurovision Song Contest which took place on 12 May 2022. Performing during the show in position 1, "Jezebel" was announced among the top 10 entries of the second semi-final and hence qualified to compete in the final. In the final, Finland placed 21st with 38 points. It was later revealed that the country placed 7th in the semi-final with 162 points.

== Background ==
Prior to the 2022 contest, Yleisradio (Yle) had participated in the Eurovision Song Contest representing Finland fifty-four times since its first entry in 1961. It has won the contest once in 2006 with the song "Hard Rock Hallelujah" performed by Lordi. In 2021, "Dark Side" performed by Blind Channel managed to qualify Finland to the final and placed sixth, becoming Finland's equal-second best result in the contest to date, alongside "Tom Tom Tom" by Marion Rung in 1973.

As part of its duties as participating broadcaster, Yle organises the selection of its entry in the Eurovision Song Contest and broadcasts the event in the country. The broadcaster confirmed its intentions to participate at the 2022 contest on 24 May 2021. Yle had selected its entries for the contest through national final competitions that have varied in format over the years. Between 1961 and 2011, a selection show that was often titled Euroviisukarsinta highlighted that the purpose of the program was to select a song for Eurovision. However, since 2012, the broadcaster has organised the selection show Uuden Musiikin Kilpailu (UMK), which focuses on showcasing new music with the winning song being selected as the Finnish entry for that year. Along with its participation confirmation, the broadcaster also announced that its entry for the 2022 contest would be selected through Uuden Musiikin Kilpailu 2022.

== Before Eurovision ==
=== Uuden Musiikin Kilpailu 2022 ===
Uuden Musiikin Kilpailu 2022 was the eleventh edition of Uuden Musiikin Kilpailu (UMK), the music competition that selects Finland's entries for the Eurovision Song Contest. The competition consisted of a final on 26 February 2022, held at the Logomo in Turku and hosted by Paula Vesala and Miisa Rotola-Pukkila. The show was broadcast on Yle TV1 with a second audio program providing commentary in Finnish by Mikko Silvennoinen, in Swedish by Eva Frantz and Johan Lindroos, in Simple Finnish by Margit Alasalmi and Pertti Seppä, in Northern Sami by Linda Tammela, in Inari Sami by Heli Huovinen, and in English by Katri Norrlin and Jani Kareinen, as well as online at Yle Areena. The competition was also broadcast via radio on Yle Radio Suomi and with commentary in Swedish by Eva Frantz and Johan Lindroos on Yle X3M. The competition was watched by 1.9 million viewers in Finland, making it the most watched edition of UMK since its establishment in 2012.

==== Competing entries ====
A submission period was opened by Yle which lasted between 1 September 2021 and 6 September 2021. At least one of the writers and the lead singer(s) had to hold Finnish citizenship or live in Finland permanently in order for the entry to qualify to compete. A panel of eight experts appointed by Yle selected seven entries for the competition from the 312 received submissions. The experts were Tapio Hakanen (Head of Music at YleX), Anssi Autio (UMK producer), Juha-Matti Valtonen (television director), Samuli Väänänen (Senior Editor at Spotify Finland), Joanna Tzortzis (music editor), Katri Norrlin (music journalist at YleX), Jani Kareinen (music journalist at YleX) and Amie Borgar (Head of Music at Yle X3M). The competing entries were presented on 12 January 2022, while their lyric videos were released between 13 and 21 January 2022.

Artist	Song	Songwriter(s)
Bess	"Ram pam pam"	Bess; Jonas Olsson; Tomi Saario
Cyan Kicks	"Hurricane"	Elize Ryd; Niila Perkkiö; Susanna Alexandra; Chris Walla; Zakk Cervini
Isaac Sene	"Kuuma jäbä"	Isaac Sene; Alvar Yrjänä Escartin
Olivera	"Thank God I'm an Atheist"	Katriina Ullakko; Lenno Linjama; Alpo Nummelin
The Rasmus	"Jezebel"	Lauri Ylönen; Desmond Child
Tommi Läntinen	"Elämä kantaa mua"	Leo Hakanen; Jere Marttila; Elli Haloo
Younghearted	"Sun numero"	Reeta Huotarinen; Joonas Keronen; Vilma Alina Lähteenmäki

==== Final ====
The final took place on 26 February 2022 where seven entries competed. "Jezebel" performed by The Rasmus was selected as the winner by a combination of public votes (75%) and seven international jury groups from Cyprus, Norway, Serbia, Germany, Spain, the Czech Republic and Italy (25%). The viewers had a total of 882 points to award, while the juries had a total of 294 points to award. Each jury group distributed their points as follows: 2, 4, 6, 8, 10 and 12 points. The viewer vote was based on the percentage of votes each song achieved through the following voting methods: telephone, SMS and app voting. For example, if a song gained 10% of the viewer vote, then that entry would be awarded 10% of 882 points rounded to the nearest integer: 88 points. A total of 152,402 votes were cast during the show: 48,546 votes through telephone and SMS and 103,826 votes through the Yle app.

In addition to the performances of the competing entries, the show was opened by 2021 Finnish Eurovision entrants Blind Channel performing "Dark Side" and "Bad Idea", while the interval act featured JVG performing their song "Vamos" and Paula Vesala performing her songs "Pulkka" and "Uu Mama".

Final – 26 February 2022
R/O	Artist	Song	Jury	Televote			Total	Place
R/O	Artist	Song	Jury	Votes	Percentage	Points	Total	Place
1	The Rasmus	"Jezebel"	68	41,758	27.4%	242	310	1
2	Isaac Sene	"Kuuma jäbä"	28	17,069	11.2%	99	127	5
3	Olivera	"Thank God I'm an Atheist"	46	20,879	13.7%	121	167	4
4	Bess	"Ram pam pam"	56	25,604	16.8%	148	204	3
5	Younghearted	"Sun numero"	40	8,839	5.8%	51	91	6
6	Cyan Kicks	"Hurricane"	52	29,261	19.2%	169	221	2
7	Tommi Läntinen	"Elämä kantaa mua"	4	8,992	5.9%	52	56	7

Detailed international jury votes
R/O	Song	Cyprus	Norway	Serbia	Germany	Spain	Czech Republic	Italy	Total
R/O	Song	Cyprus	Norway	Serbia	Germany	Spain	Czech Republic	Italy	Total
1	"Jezebel"	6	12	10	12	10	6	12	68
2	"Kuuma jäbä"	2	6	2	6		10	2	28
3	"Thank God I'm an Atheist"	12	4	6	10	6	4	4	46
4	"Ram pam pam"	10	2	12	8	12	2	10	56
5	"Sun numero"	8	8	4	4	2	8	6	40
6	"Hurricane"	4	10	8	2	8	12	8	52
7	"Elämä kantaa mua"					4			4
International jury spokespersons
Cyprus – Elena Tsagrinou; Norway – Keiino; Serbia – Bojana Stamenov; Germany – Jendrik; Spain – Rosa López; Czech Republic – Albert Černý; Italy – Marta Cagnola

== At Eurovision ==
According to Eurovision rules, all nations with the exceptions of the host country and the "Big Five" (France, Germany, Italy, Spain and the United Kingdom) are required to qualify from one of two semi-finals in order to compete for the final; the top ten countries from each semi-final progress to the final. The European Broadcasting Union (EBU) split up the competing countries into six different pots based on voting patterns from previous contests, with countries with favourable voting histories put into the same pot. On 25 January 2022, an allocation draw was held which placed each country into one of the two semi-finals, as well as which half of the show they would perform in. Finland has been placed into the second semi-final, to be held on 12 May 2022, and has been scheduled to perform in the first half of the show.

Once all the competing songs for the 2022 contest had been released, the running order for the semi-finals was decided by the shows' producers rather than through another draw, so that similar songs were not placed next to each other. Finland was set to perform in position 1, before the entry from Israel.

=== Voting ===
Voting during the three shows involved each country awarding two sets of points from 1–8, 10 and 12: one from their professional jury and the other from televoting. Each nation's jury consisted of five music industry professionals who are citizens of the country they represent, with a diversity in gender and age represented. The judges assess each entry based on the performances during the second dress rehearsal of each show, which takes place the night before each live show, against a set of criteria including: vocal capacity; the stage performance; the song's composition and originality; and the overall impression by the act. Jury members may only take part in panel once every three years, and are obliged to confirm that they are not connected to any of the participating acts in a way that would impact their ability to vote impartially. Jury members should also vote independently, with no discussion of their vote permitted with other jury members. The exact composition of the professional jury, and the results of each country's jury and televoting were released after the grand final; the individual results from each jury member were also released in an anonymised form.

Below is a breakdown of points awarded to Finland and awarded by Finland in the second semi-final and grand final of the contest, and the breakdown of the jury voting and televoting conducted during the two shows:

==== Points awarded to Finland ====
Points awarded to Finland (Semi-final 2)
Score	Televote	Jury
12 points	Estonia; Sweden	
10 points	Czech Republic	
8 points	North Macedonia	Estonia
7 points	Germany	
6 points	Georgia; Malta; Poland; Spain	
5 points	Azerbaijan	Belgium; Israel; Serbia
4 points	Belgium; Romania; United Kingdom	Azerbaijan; Montenegro; North Macedonia; Poland; Romania; Sweden
3 points	San Marino	Georgia; Malta; San Marino
2 points	Australia; Cyprus	Cyprus; Czech Republic; Spain
1 point	Ireland; Serbia	Germany

Points awarded to Finland (Final)
Score	Televote	Jury
12 points		
10 points		
8 points	Estonia	
7 points	Sweden	
6 points		Serbia
5 points		Estonia
4 points	Ukraine	
3 points		
2 points	Albania; Georgia	
1 point	Czech Republic; Latvia; Malta	Italy

==== Points awarded by Finland ====
Points awarded by Finland (Semi-final 2)
Score	Televote	Jury
12 points	Estonia	Sweden
10 points	Sweden	Australia
8 points	Serbia	Serbia
7 points	Czech Republic	Azerbaijan
6 points	Australia	Czech Republic
5 points	Poland	San Marino
4 points	San Marino	Estonia
3 points	Romania	Cyprus
2 points	Georgia	North Macedonia
1 point	Belgium	Poland

Points awarded by Finland (Final)
Score	Televote	Jury
12 points	Ukraine	Sweden
10 points	Estonia	United Kingdom
8 points	Sweden	Australia
7 points	Serbia	Serbia
6 points	Norway	Greece
5 points	Moldova	Netherlands
4 points	United Kingdom	Norway
3 points	Spain	Azerbaijan
2 points	Lithuania	Italy
1 point	France	Armenia

==== Detailed voting results ====
The following members comprised the Finnish jury:

- Amie Borgar
- Haza Hajipoori
- Juuso Määttänen
- Riku
- Tiina Susanna Vainikainen

Detailed voting results from Finland (Semi-final 2)
R/O	Country	Jury							Televote	
R/O	Country	Juror 1	Juror 2	Juror 3	Juror 4	Juror 5	Rank	Points	Rank	Points
01	Finland									
02	Israel	9	6	14	12	9	13		11	
03	Serbia	2	5	8	1	15	3	8	3	8
04	Azerbaijan	8	9	4	4	8	4	7	14	
05	Georgia	14	17	15	5	12	15		9	2
06	Malta	15	16	16	10	4	14		16	
07	San Marino	10	7	9	2	13	6	5	7	4
08	Australia	5	2	2	6	3	2	10	5	6
09	Cyprus	4	15	13	7	5	8	3	12	
10	Ireland	12	4	11	9	16	12		13	
11	North Macedonia	6	13	3	14	11	9	2	15	
12	Estonia	13	10	5	15	2	7	4	1	12
13	Romania	17	11	17	16	10	17		8	3
14	Poland	11	8	6	11	6	10	1	6	5
15	Montenegro	16	14	7	13	17	16		17	
16	Belgium	7	3	10	17	14	11		10	1
17	Sweden	3	1	1	3	1	1	12	2	10
18	Czech Republic	1	12	12	8	7	5	6	4	7

Detailed voting results from Finland (Final)
R/O	Country	Jury							Televote	
R/O	Country	Juror 1	Juror 2	Juror 3	Juror 4	Juror 5	Rank	Points	Rank	Points
01	Czech Republic	5	19	9	13	13	12		15	
02	Romania	23	23	16	21	20	23		14	
03	Portugal	14	11	15	11	17	16		17	
04	Finland									
05	Switzerland	22	14	5	17	21	14		21	
06	France	20	16	24	23	12	19		10	1
07	Norway	2	17	3	15	9	7	4	5	6
08	Armenia	13	12	7	12	5	10	1	24	
09	Italy	8	7	20	9	6	9	2	16	
10	Spain	10	21	11	5	11	11		8	3
11	Netherlands	9	5	8	6	3	6	5	12	
12	Ukraine	6	10	12	10	18	13		1	12
13	Germany	24	22	21	19	24	24		20	
14	Lithuania	21	15	19	20	22	21		9	2
15	Azerbaijan	11	9	13	8	2	8	3	22	
16	Belgium	18	6	23	18	23	17		18	
17	Greece	17	4	4	2	14	5	6	23	
18	Iceland	19	20	18	24	19	22		19	
19	Moldova	12	24	22	22	16	20		6	5
20	Sweden	3	1	1	1	4	1	12	3	8
21	Australia	4	3	6	3	7	3	8	11	
22	United Kingdom	7	2	2	4	10	2	10	7	4
23	Poland	15	13	14	14	8	15		13	
24	Serbia	1	8	17	7	1	4	7	4	7
25	Estonia	16	18	10	16	15	18		2	10
