= Tommi Läntinen =

Finnish singer-songwriter

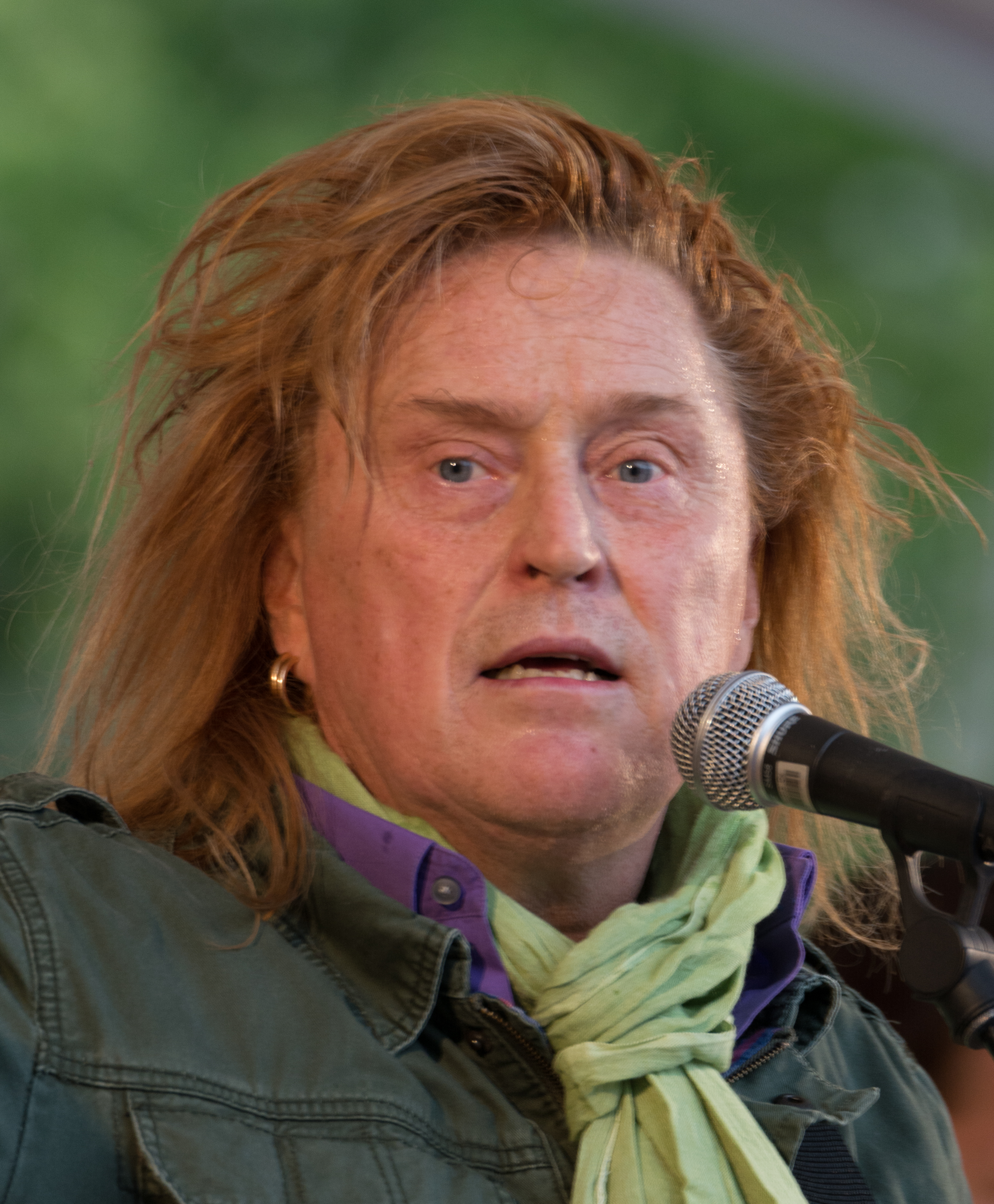
- Läntinen in 2013.

Background information
- Born: Tommi Pekka Läntinen; August 22, 1959 (age 67); Turku, Finland
- Origin: Turku, Finland
- Genres: Pop, rock, schlager
- Occupation: Singer-songwriter
- Instruments: Vocals, guitar
- Years active: 1980–present
- Website: tommilantinen.fi (in Finnish)

Tommi Pekka Läntinen (born August 22, 1959) is a Finnish singer-songwriter.

== Career ==
After starting his career in 1980, Läntinen has worked in a number of bands as a vocalist and songwriter—perhaps best known as a lead vocalist of the bands Boycott and Fabrics. At that time, Läntinen mainly sang in English, but as he began his solo career in 1993, he started to write his lyrics in Finnish. His debut solo album, Veijareita ja pyhimyksiä, was released in 1994 and his seventh and latest solo album, Isoja aikoja, was released in 2011.

With over 144,707 records sold, Läntinen is one of the best-selling male soloists in Finland.

On 12 January 2022, he was announced as one of the participants in the Finnish national final for Eurovision 2022.

== Personal life ==
Läntinen has a son, Ilmari, who was born in 1997. In 2015, he divorced his son's mother after thirty years of marriage. The family had moved to Portugal in 2006, but later relocated back to Finland in 2010. Läntinen currently lives in Espoo.

== Discography ==
=== Solo albums ===
- Veijareita ja pyhimyksiä (1994)
- Maalla, merellä ja ilmassa! (1995)
- Punainen graniitti (1997)
- Iltavilli (1999)
- Tähtilaiva (2002)
- Popniitti (2004)
- Isoja aikoja (2011)
- Elämä Kantaa Mua (2022)
