= Liquid (The Rasmus song) =

Single by the Rasmus

from the album Hell of a Tester
- Released: 1998
- Length: 4:17
- Label: Warner Music Finland
- Songwriters: Eero Heinonen; Janne Heiskanen; Pauli Rantasalmi; Lauri Ylönen
- Producers: The Rasmus; The Nose

The Rasmus singles chronology
"Ice" (1998)	"Liquid" (1998)	"Swimming with the Kids" (1999)

"Liquid" is a song by the Finnish rock band the Rasmus, included on the band's third album, Hell of a Tester, on 2 November 1998. The song was released as the album's lead single in 1998 by Warner Music Finland and reached number two on the Finland Singles Chart.

== Music video ==
"Liquid" is the only song from the album for which a music video was filmed. It was directed by Viljami Eronen and won an honorable mention at the 1999 Oulu Music Video Festival. The video shows a dark place, sometimes with stars in the background. The band play their instruments and there is also a young woman there, wearing a black dress. Traditional children's toys are featured, including a hoop, skipping rope, ball and scooter. Bassist Eero Heinonen appears to be wearing pyjamas and is seen switching off a lamp. During the instrumental interlude in the song, the woman is seen swimming upwards towards the light. The cheerful, uplifting tone of the song is emphasised by the video, as the band members are playing like children and some of them are seen spinning on their chairs.

== Personnel ==
- Lauri Ylönen – vocals
- Pauli Rantasalmi – guitar
- Eero Heinonen – bass
- Janne Heiskanen – drums
- Riku Niemi – strings

== Charts ==
Chart (1998)	Peak position
Finland (Suomen virallinen lista)	2
