= Kwan (band) =

Finnish hip hop/pop music group

- Origin: Helsinki, Finland
- Genres: Pop, hip hop
- Years active: 2000–present
- Labels: Dynasty
- Members: Mariko (vocals); Tidjan (vocals)

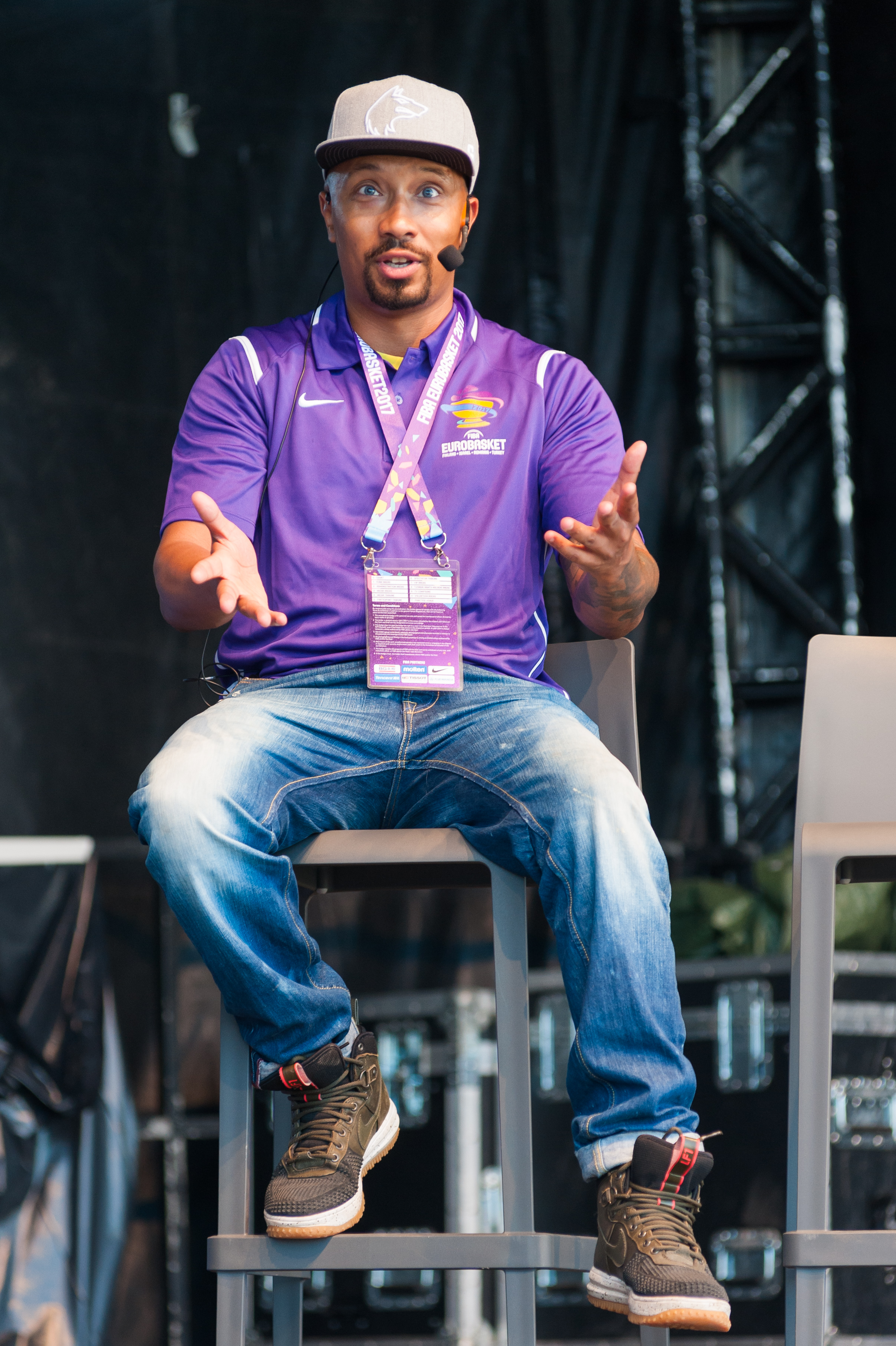
Tidjan in 2017

Kwan is a Finnish hip hop and pop music group from Helsinki. Most visible members of the band are the two vocalists Mariko (Mari Liisa Pajalahti) and Tidjan (Ossi Bah Tidiane). The band started as a hip hop act, but nowadays the songs contain more singing than rapping.

The first album, Dynasty, sold platinum in Finland, the second one, The Die Is Cast double platinum.

== Discography ==
=== Studio albums ===
- Dynasty (2001)
- The Die Is Cast (2002)
- Love Beyond This World (2004)
- Little Notes (2006)

=== Singles ===
- Padam (2001)
- Microphoneaye (2001)
- Late (2001)
- Rock da House (2001)
- The Die Is Cast (2002)
- I Wonder (Promo-CD, 2002)
- Rain (2002)
- Shine (2002)
- Chillin' at the Grotto (2002)
- Unconditional Love (2004)
- Decadence of the Heart (2004)
- Sharks in the Bloody Waters (2004)
- Diamonds (2006)
- Tainted Love (2006)
- 10,000 Light Years (2009)
- One Last Time (2014)
