= New World (Lauri Ylönen album) =

2011 studio album by Lauri Ylönen

Studio album by Lauri Ylönen
- Released: 30 March 2011
- Recorded: 2010–2011
- Genre: Synthpop
- Length: 40:25
- Label: Dynasty
- Producer: Lauri Ylönen

Singles from New World
- 1. "Heavy" Released: 23 February 2011; 2. "In the City" Released: 17 June 2011; 3. "What Are You Waiting For?" Released: 4 November 2011

New World is the first solo album from Lauri Ylönen, lead singer of Finnish band The Rasmus. The album was released on 30 March 2011. The album contains songs by Ylönen that did not fit The Rasmus' style, and decided to be released as a solo album. The first single released was "Heavy" and the second was "In the City".

== Charts ==
Chart (2011)	Peak position
Finnish Albums Chart	2

== Track listing ==
No.	Title	Length
1.	"Disco-nnect"	3:39
2.	"Heavy"	4:03
3.	"Have a Little Mercy"	3:54
4.	"Hello"	3:42
5.	"In the City"	3:56
6.	"You Don't Remember My Name"	3:25
7.	"Because of You"	3:59
8.	"What Are You Waiting For?"	4:49
9.	"Got You on My Mind"	4:23
10.	"New World"	4:42

All the songs were written by Lauri Ylönen, except for tracks 2 to 7 which were written by Ylönen and Pauli Rantasalmi.
