= Playboys (The Rasmus album) =

Studio album by Rasmus
- Released: 29 August 1997
- Recorded: 1997
- Studio: Millbrook and H.I.P. Studios; Helsinki, Finland
- Length: 39:46
- Label: Warner Music Finland
- Producer: Rasmus, Ilkka Herkman

Rasmus chronology
Peep (1996)	Playboys (1997)	Hell of a Tester (1998)

Singles from Playboys
- 1. "Blue" Released: 1997; 2. "Kola" Released: 1997; 3. "Playboys" Released: 1997; 4. "Ice" Released: 1998

Playboys is the second album by Finnish rock band Rasmus, which was released on 29 August 1997 on Warner Music Finland.

It was certified Gold in Finland, and the single "Blue" also went Gold when it was released in May the same year.

== Release ==
The debut single, "Blue", from Playboys was released on 29 August 1997. If you exclude 1st, 2nd and 3rd and count them as EPs, "Blue" is the first single released by The Rasmus. I"Blue" is a softer, more melodic song compared to the other songs from the album. The single was a big success in the band's native country, Finland, where it sold gold and reached #3 on the Finnish Singles Chart.

The final single, "Ice", features the B-side song, "Ufolaulu" (a song in Finnish about UFOs).

== Track listing ==
Playboys track listing
No.	Title	Length
1.	"Playboys"	2:45
2.	"Blue"	4:23
3.	"Ice"	2:47
4.	"Sophia"	2:43
5.	"Wicked Moments"	2:55
6.	"Wellwell"	3:21
7.	"Sold"	3:55
8.	"Carousel"	1:42
9.	"Jailer"	2:29
10.	"Kola"	3:51
11.	"Raggatip"	3:36
12.	"Violence"	2:23
13.	"Panda"	2:50
Total length:		39:46

== Personnel ==
The Rasmus

- Lauri Ylönen – vocals
- Pauli Rantasalmi – guitar
- Eero Heinonen – bass
- Janne Heiskanen – drums

Additional musicians

- Ilkka Hämäläinen – turntables, saxophones, panda 49, backing vocals
- Axel F. – trumpet
- Aleksi Ahoniemi – saxophone
- Matti Lappalainen – trombone
- Mamba Abdissa Assefa – percussion
- Timo Lavanko – alto saxophone, clarinet on "Panda"
- Tuukka Helminen – cello on "Blue"
- Tuomo Prättälä – Wurlitzer on "Sold"
- Mara Salminen – moog synth on "Wicked Moments", "Panda" and "Well Well"
- Hannu Pikkarainen – panda 49 on "Blue"
- Hanna Viitanen – steel pans on "Carousel"
- Essi Grönberg – backing vocals on "Raggatip" and "Wicked Moments"
- Katja Aakkula – backing vocals on "Raggatip"

Production and design

- The Rasmus and Illka Herkman – producers
- Juha Heininen and Illka Herkman – recorders, mixers
- Pauli Saastamoinen – mastering
- Braalot – sleeve
- Rascar – photographs

== Charts ==
Chart performance for "Blue"
Chart (1997)	Peak position
Finland (Suomen virallinen lista)	3

Chart performance for "Ice"
Chart (1998)	Peak position
Finland (Suomen virallinen lista)	2
