= Mari Pajalahti =

Finnish singer

MC Mariko
- Born: Mari Liisa Pajalahti; 15 March 1979 (age 46); Finland

Mari Liisa Pajalahti (born 15 March 1979), also known by her stage name MC Mariko, is one of two lead singers of hip-hop music group Kwan. She has also acted in a Finnish TV soap opera called Salatut elämät in the role of Virpi Hurme from 1999 to 2000. In addition, she has played the lead role in the musical Dakota.

In 2007, Mariko was chosen to dance in season two of the Finnish version of Dancing with the Stars (Tanssii tähtien kanssa). Together with her partner Aleksi Seppänen, she went on to win the entire competition on 22 April 2007.
