= Peep (album) =

Studio album by the Rasmus
- Released: 23 September 1996
- Recorded: 1995–1996 in Helsinki, Finland
- Length: 44:25
- Label: Warner Music Finland
- Producer: Rasmus, Teja Kotilainen

The Rasmus chronology
1st (1995)	Peep (1996)	Playboys (1997)

Peep is the debut album by Finnish rock band the Rasmus, released on 23 September 1996 on Warner Music Finland.

They met their first manager and record producer, Teja Kotilainen, in 1995, and signed with Warner Music Finland in February 1996. They released their first EP, called 1st, on Teja G. Records, in December 1995, which featured the songs "Frog", "Myself", "Funky Jam" and "Rakkauslaulu". The album was first released in Finland, where it went Gold, and later in Estonia and Russia, and subsequently worldwide.

== Track listing ==
1. "Ghostbusters" (Ray Parker Jr. cover) – 3:35
2. "Postman" – 2:38
3. "Fool" – 3:43
4. "Shame" – 3:30
5. "P.S." – 3:04
6. "Julen är här igen" – 3:30
7. "Peep" (instrumental) – 0:49
8. "Frog" – 2:31
9. "Funky Jam" – 2:13
10. "Outflow" – 2:51
11. "Myself" – 3:50
12. "Life 705" – 5:09
13. "Small" – 6:26
- Untitled - (After 1 minute and 55 seconds of silence after the song "Small", you will hear a man saying something in Finnish and a child saying "hello" and "bye bye".) (Hidden track)

== Singles ==
The singles from Peep were not named after the songs. The names were "1st", "2nd" and "3rd". 1st is actually an EP, containing four tracks (including the non-album song "Rakkauslaulu"). Their very first music video was made for "Funky Jam" the same year.

- The first single from the album was 1st, released in 1995.
- 2nd was the second single, released in 1996.
- 3rd was the last single from the album, released in 1996.

== Credits ==
The Rasmus

- Lauri Ylönen – vocals
- Pauli Rantasalmi – guitar
- Eero Heinonen – bass
- Janne Heiskanen – drums

Additional musicians

- Timo Lavanko – saxophone on "Outflow"
- Aleksi Ahoniemi – saxophone on "Postman" and "P.S."
- Jukka Tiirikainen – trumpet on "P.S."

Additional personnel

- The Rasmus and Teja Kotilainen – producers
- Juha Heininen, Ilkka Herkman, Teja Kotilainen – recorders
- Juha Heininen, Jarno Patala – mixers
- Pauli Saastamoinen – mastering
- Dick Lindberg, Klikki – photography
