= Hide from the Sun =

Studio album by The Rasmus
- Released: September 12, 2005
- Recorded: 2005 in Stockholm, Sweden
- Genre: Alternative rock, alternative metal
- Length: 53:54
- Label: Playground Music Scandinavia
- Producer: Martin Hansen, Mikael Nord

The Rasmus chronology
Dead Letters (2003)	Hide from the Sun (2005)	Black Roses (2008)

Singles from Hide from the Sun
- 1. "Sail Away" Released: October 25, 2005; 2. "No Fear" Released: December 10, 2005; 3. "Shot" Released: March 30, 2006; 4. "Keep Your Heart Broken" Released: August 7, 2006

Professional ratings
Review scores
Source	Rating
Kerrang!	2/5 stars
Melodic	3.5/5 stars

Hide from the Sun is the sixth studio album by the Finnish rock band The Rasmus. It was originally released in mainland Europe, the United Kingdom, Scandinavia and Japan on 12 September 2005. It was later released in the United States on 10 October 2006, and featured a selection of B-side remixes and special edition bonus tracks. The US edition also included the previously unseen video for "Immortal". The name "Hide from the Sun" is a quotation from the song "Dead Promises". The album cover was painted by guitarist Pauli Rantasalmi.

It received Platinum status in Finland and sold more than 15,000 in the UK and 20,000 in the US. Overall the album has sold over 500,000 copies worldwide.

== Singles ==
- The first single, named "No Fear" was released on 5 September 2005.
- The second single, "Sail Away", was released on 14 November 2005.
- The third single from the album was "Shot". It was released on April 24, 2006.

All singles (except for "Shot") are also available as maxi singles, with different track listings and covers. The maxi singles features the PC-software "The Rasmus Player" with photos and videos.

A video has also been made for "Immortal", but the song was not released as a single.

== Music videos ==
The video for "No Fear" includes a girl who The Rasmus 'feel for' by singing about her life and how she feels. The girl has an obsession with butterflies and follows them out of her small dark bedroom as she sleep-walks. Unaware of her sleep-walking she accidentally steps on broken glass on top of a roof and falls through to where the band is playing. But has she died? She appears to end up in a beautiful garden with a bed randomly placed in the middle, surrounded by butterflies and flowers. However, she also stays in her dingy bedroom, gloomily looking up at the framed butterfly picture on her wall. The effect is added to at the end by reusing several of the shots seen at the beginning of the video.

In the video for "Sail Away" some black butterflies fly away to the sea after singer Lauri is shown walking slowly down a cold-looking beach, singing. He sees a man coming up onto the shore carrying an empty bird-cage and he carries on walking. He sees that man again, digging a grave and a woman standing near him. The woman jerks her head in Lauri's direction to him. Lauri also sees more odd happenings, such as two children dancing around a wood sculpture (possibly a pyre) in gas masks. The pyre has dolls in coffins hung on it. Lauri enters a shack, lucky enough to walk in just in time as a sand-storm occurs and seeps into the shack. Aki (drummer) and Eero (bassist) both turn into sand-figures. At the end of the video, Aki's head and Eero's arms both fall off.

In the video for "Shot" the band seems to be in outer space, singing on a desert-like planet. The video consists of mainly alternating between close-ups of each band member and different angles of the whole band. Fast zooms and camera angle changes are used in parts of the video. At one point, there is a close-up of singer Lauri's eye and a comet flickers across his iris. This is very similar to a part of the video for "First Day of My Life", in which a close up of Lauri's eye is seen with a reflection of a racing track.

The video for "Immortal" is pieced together from various live performances of the song. It was directed by Eero Heinonen and some of his friends.

== Track listing ==
The Rasmus and composed by Lauri Ylönen
No.	Title	Length
1.	"Shot"	4:18
2.	"Night After Night (Out of the Shadows)"	3:44
3.	"No Fear"	4:07
4.	"Lucifer's Angel"	4:01
5.	"Last Generation"	4:03
6.	"Dead Promises"	3:39
7.	"Immortal"	4:57
8.	"Sail Away"	3:49
9.	"Keep Your Heart Broken"	3:56
10.	"Heart of Misery"	3:27
11.	"Don't Let Go"	4:42

Digipak bonus tracks
No.	Title	Length
12.	"Dancer in the Dark"	3:31

UK bonus tracks
No.	Title	Length
12.	"Open My Eyes"	3:48

Japan bonus tracks
No.	Title	Length
12.	"Trigger"	2:48
13.	"No Fear" (Chris Vrenna Remix)	3:40

Japan bonus DVD
No.	Title	Length
1.	"Making of No Fear" (Video)	8:00
2.	"No Fear" (Video)	3:41

US bonus tracks
No.	Title	Length
12.	"Dancer in the Dark"	3:31
13.	"Open My Eyes" (Acoustic)	3:21
14.	"Trigger"	3:21
15.	"No Fear" (Chris Vrenna Remix)	3:40
16.	"Sail Away" (Benztown Mixdown)	7:29
17.	"Lucifer's Angel" (Acoustic)	3:47

Mexico bonus tracks
No.	Title	Length
1.	"Keep Your Heart Broken" (Live)	4:04
2.	"Heart of Misery" (Live)	3:37
3.	"Sail Away" (Live)	3:50
4.	"No Fear" (Live)	3:59
5.	"In The Shadows" (Live)	4:43

== Personnel ==
The Rasmus

- Lauri Ylönen – vocals
- Pauli Rantasalmi – guitar
- Eero Heinonen – bass
- Aki Hakala – drums

Other Personnel

- Apocalyptica – cellos and arrangements on "Dead Promises"
- Jesper Nordenström – string arrangements on "Lucifer's Angels" and "Sail Away"
- Jakob Ruthberg, Anna S Wallgren, Roland Kress, Christian Bergqvist – strings on "Lucifer's Angels" and "Sail Away"

Production

- Mikael Nord – producer, recording and mixing
- Martin Hansen – producer, recording and mixing
- Christofer Stannow – mastering
- Roger Lian – remastering
- Walse/Undén – sleeve and photography

== Charts ==
Weekly chart performance for Hide from the Sun
Chart (2005)	Peak position
French Albums (SNEP)	29
Finnish Albums (Suomen virallinen lista)	1
Hungarian Albums (MAHASZ)	12
Swedish Albums (Sverigetopplistan)	16

== Release history ==
Country	Date
Europe	12 September 2005
United States	10 October 2006
