= Black Roses (album) =

Studio album by the Rasmus
- Released: 24 September 2008
- Recorded: September 2007 – Spring 2008 in Helsinki, Nashville
- Genre: Alternative metal, alternative rock, symphonic rock, gothic rock
- Length: 45:41
- Label: Playground Music (Europe)
- Producer: Desmond Child, Harry Sommerdahl

The Rasmus chronology
| Hide from the Sun (2005) | Black Roses (2008) | Best of 2001–2009 (2009) |

Singles from Black Roses
- 1. "Livin' in a World Without You" Released: 10 September 2008; 2. "Justify" Released: 2 February 2009

Black Roses is the seventh studio album by the Finnish rock band the Rasmus, which was released on 29 September 2008 in the UK. In Germany the album was released on 26 September and in the Nordic countries two days before. The album immediately replaced Metallica's Death Magnetic on the top spot of the Finnish Album Charts and went Gold after one week.

== Background ==
According to Dynasty Recordings' MySpace profile, the band rested in Helsinki during the winter 2006 and also wrote songs for the upcoming album. They had met the producer Desmond Child at a concert in the Dominican Republic 3 November. Guitarist Pauli Rantasalmi said that the Rasmus had written around 30 songs, 11 of which were chosen for the album. The band started recording the new album in Dynasty Studios, Helsinki, Finland, on 17 September 2007 for a month and at the end of the year went to Nashville to continue. Smaller parts were recorded in Stockholm, Singapore, Berlin and Greece. While Desmond Child was the main producer, he was helped by Harry Sommerdahl. Michael Wagener was the mixer for Black Roses except "Livin' in a World Without You", which was mixed by Niclas Flyckt. The album was originally planned to be released in March, but was delayed due to new songs the band still wanted to record, including "Livin' in a World Without You".

== Singles ==
The first single "Livin' in a World Without You" was released on 10 September and for radio stations in July. The music video for "Livin' in a World Without You" was shot on 3 July in Stockholm, and released in August. The song was first played live on 5 July in NRJ in the Park in Berlin together with another new song, "Ten Black Roses".

The second single was "Justify", released later in autumn.

Lauri Ylönen stated on the Austrian television station Go TV, that a duet with Anette Olzon (Nightwish) was scheduled for later in 2009. "October & April" was released in November 2009.

== Touring ==
The first time the Rasmus played any new songs from Black Roses was the gig in Berlin on 5 July. The group started the promotion for Black Roses with acoustic gigs at Radio SAW and RS2 in Germany 26–27 August. The Black Roses world tour started in January 2009 in Europe. In Finland they did a tour called Dynasty Tour 2008 in October 2008 together with Von Hertzen Brothers and Mariko starting from Seinäjoki and finishing in Helsinki. The Black Roses tour involved concerts in more than twenty-four countries, while some concerts in South America had to be cancelled because of the outbreak of the severe swine flu. Between 14 and 28 June 2009, the Rasmus played with Alice Cooper and Scorpions on a short stadium tour in Russia called "Monsters of Rock". In the summer months of 2009 the band played several festivals.

Professional ratings
Review scores
| Source | Rating |
|---|---|
| 411mania | link |
| Allmusic | link |
| Kerrang! | 1/5 stars |
| Melodic | 4/5 stars |

== Track listing ==
| No. | Title | Length |
|---|---|---|
| 1. | "Livin' in a World Without You" | 3:50 |
| 2. | "Ten Black Roses" | 3:54 |
| 3. | "Ghost of Love" | 3:17 |
| 4. | "Justify" | 4:26 |
| 5. | "Your Forgiveness" | 3:55 |
| 6. | "Run to You" | 4:11 |
| 7. | "You Got It Wrong" | 3:15 |
| 8. | "Lost and Lonely" | 4:46 |
| 9. | "The Fight" | 3:45 |
| 10. | "Dangerous Kind" | 3:46 |
| 11. | "Live Forever" | 3:20 |

Bonus Tracks
| No. | Title | Length |
|---|---|---|
| 12. | "Yesterday You Threw Away Tomorrow" | 3:08 |

Digital Release
| No. | Title | Length |
|---|---|---|
| 12. | "Song by Song Audio" | 9:30 |

=== Bonus DVD special fan edition ===
1. "Making of Black Roses"

== Charts ==
Weekly chart performance for Black Roses
| Chart (2008) | Peak position |
|---|---|
| Austrian Albums (Ö3 Austria) | 22 |
| Czech Albums (ČNS IFPI) | 12 |
| Dutch Albums (Album Top 100) | 51 |
| Finnish Albums (Suomen virallinen lista) | 1 |
| German Albums (Offizielle Top 100) | 13 |
| Greek International Albums (IFPI Greece) | 7 |
| Greek Overall Albums (IFPI Greece) | 26 |
| Hungarian Albums (MAHASZ) | 33 |
| Italian Albums (FIMI) | 46 |
| Mexican Albums (Top 100 Mexico) | 7 |
| Spanish Albums (Promusicae) | 58 |
| Swedish Albums (Sverigetopplistan) | 32 |
| Swiss Albums (Schweizer Hitparade) | 22 |
| UK Rock & Metal Albums (OCC) | 13 |

== Release history ==
| Country | Date | Label |
|---|---|---|
| Finland | 24 September 2008 | Playground Music |
| Sweden | 24 September 2008 | Playground Music |
| Estonia | 24 September 2008 | Playground Music |
| Norway | 24 September 2008 | Playground Music |
| Denmark | 24 September 2008 | Playground Music |
| Germany | 26 September 2008 | Universal Music |
| Austria | 26 September 2008 | Universal Music |
| Switzerland | 26 September 2008 | Universal Music |
| The Netherlands | 26 September 2008 | Universal Music |
| Poland | 26 September 2008 | Universal Music |
| International | 29 September 2008 | |
| Italy | 3 October 2008 | |
| Australia | 4 October 2008 | |
| Canada | 7 October 2008 | |
| Japan | 29 October 2008 | |
