= October & April =

Single by The Rasmus featuring Anette Olzon

from the album Best of 2001–2009
- Released: November 17, 2009
- Recorded: 2008
- Genre: Symphonic rock
- Length: 3:54
- Label: Playground Music
- Songwriter(s): Aki Hakala, Eero Heinonen, Pauli Rantasalmi, Lauri Ylönen

The Rasmus singles chronology
"Justify" (2009)	"October & April" (2009)	"I'm a Mess" (2012)

"October & April" is a song by the Finnish rock band The Rasmus, featuring Anette Olzon from Nightwish.

The song was recorded during the same time as the other songs from the band's latest studio album Black Roses, but wasn't included as it didn't follow the album concept. Instead it was later released on the band's new compilation album Best of 2001–2009. It was also released as its own digital download on November 17, 2009. Another version of the song leaked in 2010, recorded in 2006 and featuring Lena Katina of the Russian pop duo t.A.T.u., but was never officially released.

A video has also been made for the song, directed by Owe Lingvall who also directed the video for The Rasmus' last single "Justify".

== Charts ==
Chart (2009)	Peak position
Finnish Singles Chart	2
German Singles Chart	79
Poland (ZPAV)	4
