= Hell of a Tester =

Studio album by Rasmus
- Released: 2 November 1998
- Recorded: 1998 in Helsinki, Finland
- Length: 36:44
- Label: Warner Music Finland
- Producers: Rasmus, Craig Townsend and Teja Kotilainen

Rasmus chronology
Playboys (1997)	Hell of a Tester (1998)	Hell of a Collection (2001)

Hell of a Tester (stylized as Hellofatester) is the third studio album by Finnish rock band Rasmus. It was released in 1998 by Warner Music and received Gold status in Finland. The most popular single was Liquid, which was released in September, getting into the Top 40 on MTV Nordic. It was voted Single of the Year for 1998 by music critics and fans and the video won an award in 1999 at the Finnish Music Video Awards. The album was positively received by fans.

The booklet and cover art has braille dotting of lyrics from the songs inside and "Hellofatester" on the cover.

== Track listing ==
All songs were written by Rasmus.

No.	Title	Length
1.	"Every Day"	3:17
2.	"Dirty Moose"	3:27
3.	"Swimming with the Kids"	3:30
4.	"Man in the Street"	3:32
5.	"Tonight Tonight"	1:54
6.	"City of the Dead"	3:23
7.	"Liquid"	4:18
8.	"Pa-Pa"	2:18
9.	"Vibe"	2:48
10.	"Help Me Sing"	3:26
11.	"Tempo"	4:49

== Singles ==
- The first single from the album was Liquid, released the same year as the album.
- The second single, Swimming with the Kids was released in 1999. It was the last single they released under the name "Rasmus", when they changed their name to "the Rasmus".

== Credits ==
The Rasmus

- Lauri Ylönen – vocals
- Pauli Rantasalmi – guitar
- Eero Heinonen – bass
- Janne Heiskanen – drums

Additional musicians

- Saxophone by Aleksi Ahoniemi
- Trumpet by Jukka Tiirikainen
- Trombone by Matti Lappalainen
- Saxophone on Dirty Moose, Man in the Street and Vibe by Timo Lavanko and Ilkka Hämäläinen
- Saxophone on Tempo by Ilkka Hämäläinen
- Cellos on Every Day by Tuukka Helminen
- Timpani on Every Day by Mikko Pietinen
- Organ on Dirty Moose and Help Me Sing by Pate Kivinen
- Panda 49 on Swimming with the Kids and keyboards on Man in the Street and Tempo by Henri Sorvali
- Strings for Liquid arranged and conducted by Riku Niemi
- Kazoo sound effects on Swimming with the Kids by Luke Wadey

Additional personnel

- Produced at H.I.P. Studio and mixed at Finnvox Studios by Ilkka Herkman and produced by The Rasmus and Teja Kotilainen
- Liquid recorded and mixed by Juha Heininen at Millbrook Studio and produced by Rasmus and The Nose.
- Vibe recorded and mixed by Herkman at Finnvox and produced by Robert Palomäki
- Mastered by Pauli Saastamoinen at Finnvox
