= Into (album) =

Studio album by The Rasmus
- Released: March 2001 (Europe)
- Recorded: May–December 2000, 2001
- Studio: Nord Studios in Stockholm, Sweden
- Genre: Pop rock
- Length: 55:20
- Label: Playground Music (Europe); DRT Entertainment (US)
- Producer: Mikael Nord, Martin Hansen

The Rasmus chronology
| Hell of a Collection (2001) | Into (2001) | Dead Letters (2003) |

Singles from Into
- 1. "F-F-F-Falling" Released: 2 April 2001; 2. "Chill" Released: 18 June 2001; 3. "Madness" Released: 3 September 2001; 4. "Heartbreaker" / "Days" Released: 11 March 2002

Alternative cover
- Special edition cover (2003)

Professional ratings
Review scores
| Source | Rating |
|---|---|
| Melodic | 4/5 stars |

Into is the fourth studio album by the Finnish rock band the Rasmus. Released on 29 October 2001 by Playground Music, it was their first album to be released under the name "the Rasmus", rather than "Rasmus".

It is the band's first album with their new drummer Aki Hakala, who replaced Janne Heiskanen in 1999. The (international only) singles taken from it were "F-F-F-Falling", "Chill", "Madness" and "Heartbreaker/Days". Three of these were released in 2001 apart from "Heartbreaker/Days", which was released in 2002.

The album has sold double platinum in Finland and was the first album by the Rasmus to be released in other European countries such as France and Spain. They won four EMMAs in 2002 (the Finnish equivalent of Grammys) for Best Group, Best Album, Best Pop/Rock Album and Best Song (for "F-F-F-Falling").

On 20 February 2007, the album (special edition) was for the first time released in the United States by the record label DRT Entertainment. It did not contain any extra tracks.

== Track listing ==
All tracks are written by The Rasmus, except where noted.

| No. | Title | Length |
|---|---|---|
| 1. | "Madness" | 3:12 |
| 2. | "Bullet" | 4:09 |
| 3. | "Chill" | 4:17 |
| 4. | "F-F-F-Falling" | 3:52 |
| 5. | "Heartbreaker" | 3:40 |
| 6. | "Smash" | 3:43 |
| 7. | "Someone Else" | 4:28 |
| 8. | "Small Town" | 4:03 |
| 9. | "One & Only" | 3:50 |
| 10. | "Last Waltz" | 4:43 |

Bonus Tracks
| No. | Title | Length |
|---|---|---|
| 11. | "Can´t Stop Me" | 2:54 |
| 12. | "Days" | 4:13 |
| 13. | "Play Dead" | 3:52 |
| 14. | "Used To Feel Before" | 4:25 |

== Special Edition ==
A special edition of Into in digipak was released on November 5, 2003, by Playground Music Scandinavia/Edel Music. It contained the ten original songs plus four bonus tracks (Days, Can't Stop Me, Used to Feel Before and a cover of Björk's Play Dead) and the video of "F-F-F-Falling". It had a 24-page booklet with new photos of the band. The whole album was in black and white, and not in orange as the original version.

== Music videos ==
=== F-F-F-Falling (2001) ===
The first video of Into was "F-F-F-Falling". The video shows the members of the Rasmus dressed in beach-like clothes, and Lauri Ylönen using skater pads, playing the song in an apartment that looks like a recording studio. The video also shows a girl that met her friend (also a girl) at a train station, making her very happy. The girls spend time together, listening to music in a shop (that appears to be the song that The Rasmus plays in the apartment) and playing on a bus. Later they become more crazy and change clothes in the same place, go to the toilet in the street, dance everywhere, and kiss in a car, to the point that they kiss in the bed of the first girl, leading to them sleeping together. In the morning, the girl thinks about what she has done and looks like she regrets her actions. The members of the band, in some parts, look pained about what happens to the girls. One of the girls was Pauli's girlfriend.

=== Chill (2001) ===
The second video, "Chill", shows the band in a tour bus, taking photos and playing with some acoustic instruments. The video often shows the vocalist Lauri singing in the road. The video also shows some photos and mini-videos of the band in the streets.

== Singles ==
- The first single of the Into album was "F-F-F-Falling", released on April 2, 2001. It was #1 in Finland for three months in early 2001.
- Their second single (released on June 18, 2001) was "Chill", a popular song. It reached #2 in Finland.

Later, two other singles were released:

- "Madness" (September 3, 2001) and "Heartbreaker/Days" (March 11, 2002), but without new videos. "Heartbreaker" went into the Finnish charts at #2 but moved up to #1 after a week.

Some of the singles from the album contained non-album B-side tracks, which later were released on Into (Special Edition) in 2003.

== Credits ==
The Rasmus

- Lauri Ylönen – vocals
- Pauli Rantasalmi – guitar
- Eero Heinonen – bass
- Aki Hakala – drums

Additional personnel

- Jörgen Ingeström – strings
- Martin Hansen & Mikael Nord – producing, recording, programming, keyboards & additional sounds
- Leif Allansson – mixing
- Claes Persson – mastering
- Henrik Walse – design
- Jeanette Fredenburg & Lars Tengroth – photos

== Charts and certifications ==
=== Weekly charts ===
| Chart (2001) | Peak position |
|---|---|
| Finnish Albums (Suomen virallinen lista) | 1 |

=== Year-end charts ===
| Chart (2001) | Position |
|---|---|
| Finnish Albums (Suomen virallinen lista) | 4 |

=== Certifications ===
| Region | Certification | Certified units/sales |
|---|---|---|
| Finland (Musiikkituottajat) | 2× Platinum | 72,950 |
