= Lauri Ylönen =

Finnish singer (born 1979)

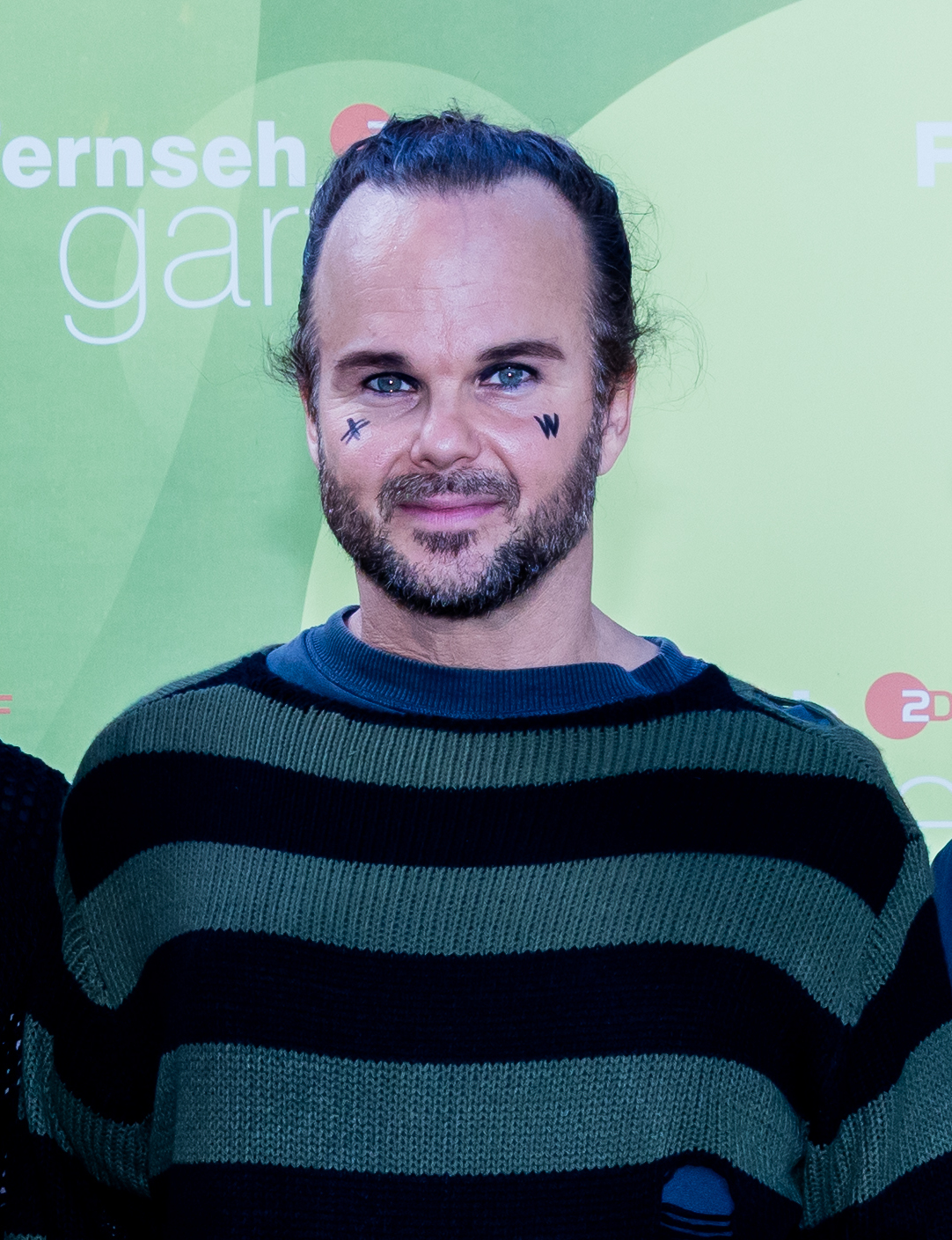
- Ylönen in 2025

Background information
- Also known as: Lintu
- Born: Lauri Johannes Ylönen; 23 April 1979 (age 47); Helsinki, Finland
- Genres: Alternative rock; pop rock; gothic rock
- Occupations: Singer; songwriter
- Years active: 1994–present
- Member of: The Rasmus
- Website: amanda.fm

Lauri Johannes Ylönen (born 23 April 1979) is a Finnish singer and songwriter, best known as the frontman of the alternative rock band The Rasmus.

== Career ==
=== The Rasmus ===
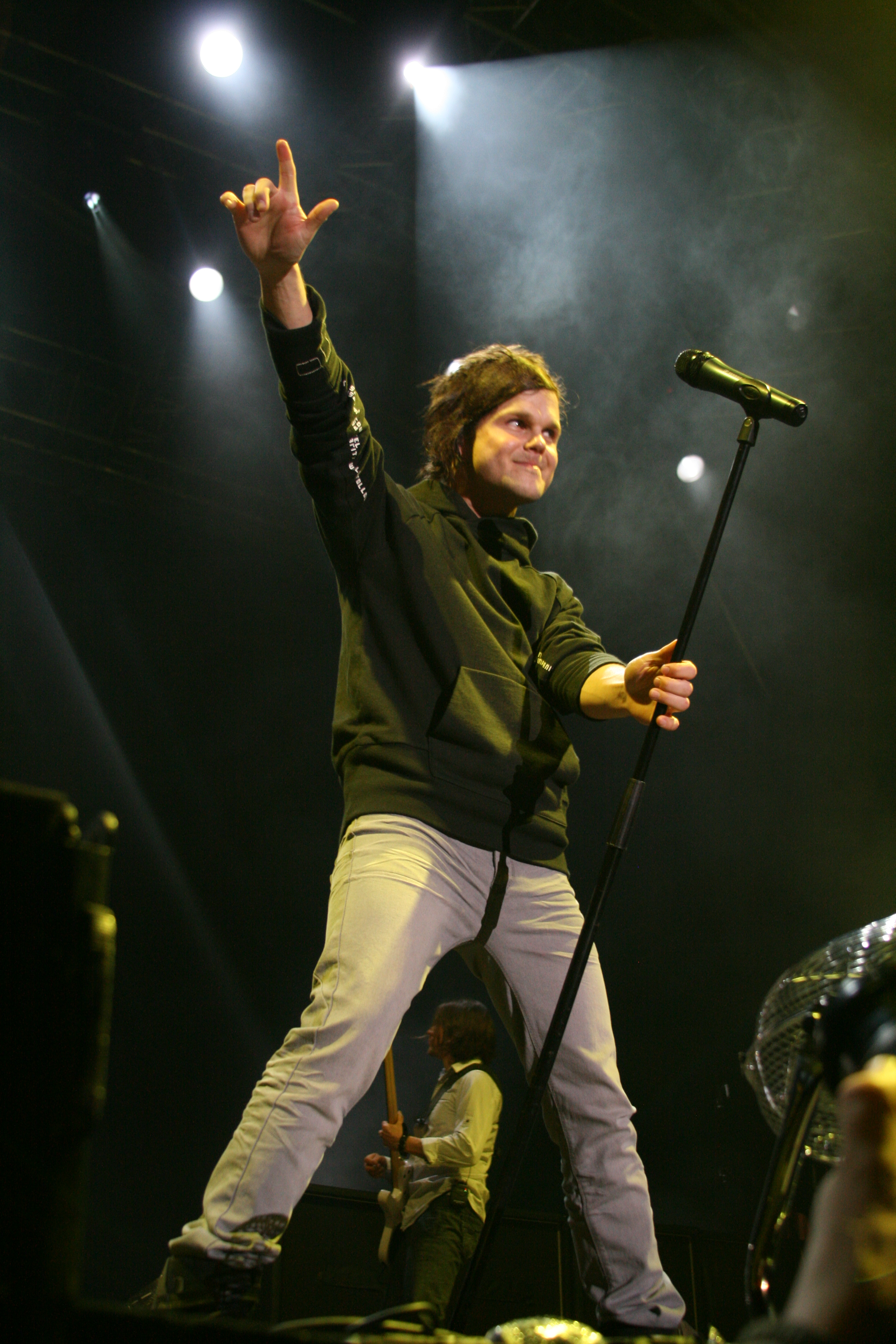
Ylönen performing in Poland, 2010

When he and Heinonen started at Suutarila high school in the early 1990s, they met Pauli Rantasalmi and, later, Janne Heiskanen. Ylönen initiated the project of The Rasmus (then called just "Rasmus") in 1994, along with Eero Heinonen (bass), Pauli Rantasalmi (guitar), and Jarno Lahti (drums), with Lahti subsequently being replaced by Heiskanen. First, they called themselves Trashmosh, then Anttila, and at last Rasmus. They played their very first show before the winter break in school in 1994. They played songs with a style of rock and funk. Ylönen became the lead singer, composer and songwriter of the band. He quit school because the band took too much of his time.

In 1998, after having released three albums, Janne Heiskanen left, and in 1999, Aki Hakala became The Rasmus' new drummer. In the same year, the band's former manager Teja Kotilainen left their current record label, Warner Music Finland. The band signed to Playground Music Scandinavia soon afterwards.

=== Dynasty ===
In 1999, an association called Dynasty was founded. The association consists of the three Finnish bands The Rasmus, Killer, and Kwan. The purpose of Dynasty was to signify allegiance and friendship between the bands and their members. Many members have tattoos or wear the Dynasty logo on guitar straps. The bands have often worked together musically. Lauri has the tattoo on his arm as well as Pauli. Pauli also got the dynasty logo on his guitar (ESP LTD).

=== Side projects ===
Lauri sang co-vocals with Siiri Nordin, the singer of Killer, on a B-side version of the group's single, "All I Want".

In 2004, Ylönen recorded a song together with Apocalyptica and HIM's singer Ville Valo, named "Bittersweet". The song is available on Apocalyptica's self-titled album, Apocalyptica. It has also been released as a single and music video.

A year later, he released another song with Apocalyptica, named "Life Burns!". This song was also released as a single and music video. The musical genre was much heavier than "Bittersweet". "Life Burns!" is taken from the same album as "Bittersweet". Ylönen also sang, with other members Kwan and Siiri Nordin of Killer, a song called "Chillin' at the Grotto" at a gala.

Ylönen's most recent project was composing the soundtrack of the Finnish movie "Blackout". The soundtrack was released in December 2008.

=== Solo ===
Ylönen announced a solo album scheduled for release in March 2011, with the first single "Heavy" being out in February. The material had its premiere at Emma Gala on 26 February 2011. Ylönen stated that he wanted several songs that did not fit The Rasmus to be released as a major record rather than a demo or something like that. The album was self-produced with his record label Dynasty Recordings. In February 2011, the title of the album was revealed, New World. It was released on 30 March 2011 in Finland, with other European countries following. For the single "Heavy", a video was shot by Owe Lingvall, who had previously directed the singles "Justify" and "October & April" for The Rasmus. In May 2011, Lauri stated that "In the City" would be the second single from his debut album. The video was shot in Las Vegas. Throughout the summer, Lauri toured the Finnish summer festivals and even a few European countries; his next stop was Germany in September 2011. In late September, it was revealed that a remixed version of "What Are You Waiting For" would be his next single. Ylönen announced that he would continue his European tour, starting with two dates in Russia in 2012. Ylönen was nominated for Best Finnish Act for the MTV EMA'S 2011. He subsequently won this category and went on to be nominated for the Best Worldwide Act.

== Personal life ==
Ylönen has a son named Julius, born in April 2008, with Finnish singer Paula Vesala, whom he married on 8 November 2014 in Las Vegas. The couple filed a statement on 29 December 2014, and the marriage was registered in Helsinki on 5 January 2015. The family moved to Los Angeles in autumn 2014. In September 2016, it was reported that the couple had filed for divorce after being together for 12 years.

Ylönen is currently in a domestic partnership with Finnish model Katriina Mikkola. The couple have two children together, a son named Oliver (born 29 December 2017) and a daughter, Ever Marlene (born 17 October 2021). The family resides in Miami.

== Discography ==
=== Studio albums ===
The Rasmus

- Peep (1996)
- Playboys (1997)
- Hell of a Tester (1998)
- Into (2001)
- Dead Letters (2003)
- Hide from the Sun (2005)
- Black Roses (2008)
- The Rasmus (2012)
- Dark Matters (2017)
- Rise (2022)
- Weirdo (2025)

Solo

- New World (2011)
