= The Rasmus =

Finnish rock band

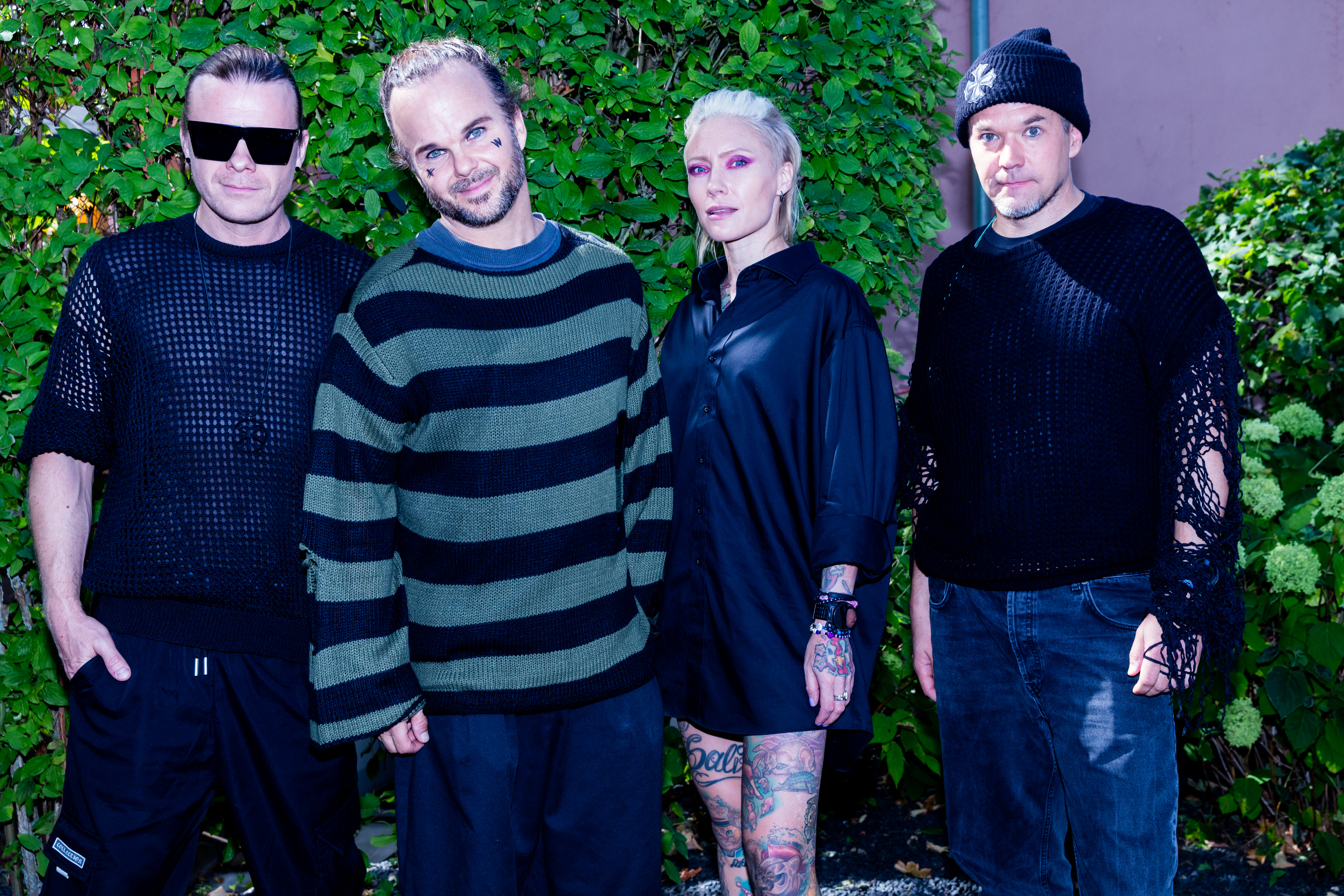
- The Rasmus in 2025. From left to right: Hakala, Ylönen, Suhonen and Heinonen

Background information
- Origin: Helsinki, Finland
- Genres: Alternative rock; pop rock; gothic rock; funk rock (early)
- Years active: 1994–present
- Labels: Playground Music; DRT; Interscope (US); Motor Music (Germany); Universal (Finland)
- Members: Lauri Ylönen; Eero Heinonen; Aki Hakala; Emilia "Emppu" Suhonen
- Past members: Jarno Lahti; Janne Heiskanen; Pauli Rantasalmi
- Website: therasmus.com
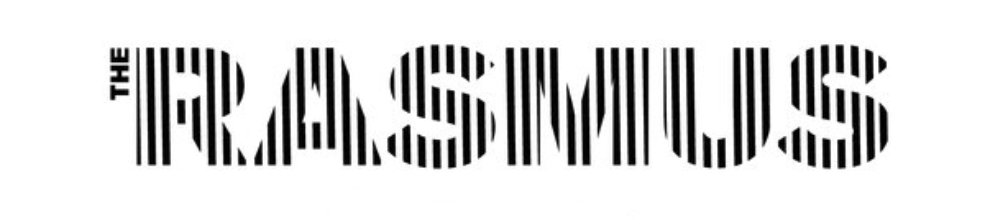

The Rasmus is a Finnish rock band that formed in 1994 in Helsinki while the band members were in upper comprehensive school. The original band members were Lauri Ylönen (founder, frontman, lead singer-songwriter), Eero Heinonen (bass), Pauli Rantasalmi (guitar) and Jarno Lahti (drums). Jarno Lahti left the year after and was replaced by Janne Heiskanen in 1995. Heiskanen quit the band in 1999 and was soon replaced by Aki Hakala. Pauli Rantasalmi left the band and was replaced by guitarist Emilia "Emppu" Suhonen in 2022. Best known for their 2003 hit single "In the Shadows", the band has sold over 6 million albums worldwide and 350,000 albums in Finland alone, and has won numerous awards, both domestic and international. The band represented Finland in the Eurovision Song Contest 2022 with the song "Jezebel".

== History ==
=== 1994–1997: Formation and first albums ===
While still in high school, Lauri Ylönen, Eero Heinonen, Pauli Rantasalmi and Jarno Lahti formed the band "Rasmus" while they were in eighth grade. The band played their first gig at their school's pre-Christmas party (23 December 1994). In 1995 Jarno left the band, and was replaced by Janne Heiskanen. In December 1995 they released their debut EP 1st, including the songs "Funky Jam", "Myself", "Frog" and "Rakkauslaulu". In only a few weeks the EP had already sold 1000 copies. The EP was originally released independently through Teja G. Records but was re-released through Warner Music Finland after they signed with them early in 1996. The band also wrote the song "Don't Shut the Door" which would stay unused until it was re-written in 2009 as "October & April" for their compilation album Best of 2001–2009. In 1996 they released their debut album Peep through Warner Music Finland. The album was first released in Finland on 23 September, where it went Gold, and later in Estonia and Russia, and subsequently worldwide. Later in 1996 the band released two more EP's, 2nd and 3rd. Even though labeled as an EP, 3rd went No. 8 on the Finnish Singles Chart later that year. Next year the band won an EMMA (the Finnish equivalent of Grammys) for the best newcomer of 1996. Lauri and Pauli decided to quit school to focus fully on Rasmus and on 29 August they released their second album Playboys. It went Gold in Finland, and the single "Blue" also went Gold when it was released in May the same year.

=== 1998–2002: Musical change with Hell of a Tester and Into ===
1998 marked the release of the third Rasmus album Hell of a Tester (sometimes written Hellofatester). The album was released on 2 November and marks a change in their musical style from funk to more solid rock. The album received Gold status in Finland. The most popular single was "Liquid", which was released in September, getting into the Top 40 on MTV Nordic. It was voted Single of the Year for 1998 by music critics and fans and the video won an award in 1999 at the Finnish Music Video Awards. Lauri wrote Liquid on Lauttasaari bridge. The band also wrote religious material which never saw daylight. During 1999 Rasmus were headlining big festivals in Finland. Janne Heiskanen left the band after playing his last gig supporting Red Hot Chili Peppers. Janne decided to retire himself in meditation in India, where he lived for some years. This left the band in disarray and were close to breaking up. Aki Hakala, who had previously sold merchandise for the band, was eventually asked to become the new drummer. Together with Killer and Kwan they formed the Dynasty association a small, independent record label for recruiting new Finnish artists. In 2000 the band changed their name from "Rasmus" to "The Rasmus" to avoid confusion with the Swedish DJ of the same name (another artist, British Rasmus Gardell, has also used the name). In late 1999 The Cardigans' manager Petri H. Lundén recommended the band to Lars Tengroth, director of new Swedish independent label Playground Music. Tengroth went to see them play live in Helsinki and, as he later told HitQuarters, "fell in love with them straight away". Having released three albums in Finland and achieved modest success they were looking to develop their career outside of the country and Playground agreed to help them do this. In late 2000 the band began working with producers Martin Hansen & Micke Nord in Sweden for their next album, ending up leaving their former funk sound completely behind and changing the style into straight forward rock. Once signed to Playground the band spent time developing their act to meet the demands of establishing themselves internationally. According to Tengroth: "It was like starting from scratch; we were creating a new band so to speak." They did a lot of things that were new to them – they spent a long time working on their songs before recording, they worked with producers for the first time, and they recorded outside of Finland. They already had a strong stage show but welcomed ideas in improving it further.

In October 2001, The Rasmus released Into, their fourth studio album, and first album for Playground Music. It was the first The Rasmus to be released in other European countries such as France and Spain. The album reached No. 1 in the Finnish album charts and spawned the singles "F-F-F-Falling", "Chill", "Madness" and "Heartbreaker/Days". All of these were released in 2001 apart from Heartbreaker/Days, which was released in 2002. For this fact and the name's change, some fans consider this album the first of "The Rasmus". In 2001 they also released their first compilation album, Hell of a Collection, composed of eighteen songs, nearly all of which were revamped versions of songs from the previous three albums. The exceptions are the final track, "Liquid" (Demo), which is a demo tape of their hit song "Liquid", and the songs "F-F-F-Falling" and "Chill" which were the first new songs released after Aki replaced Janne. They won four EMMAs in 2002 for Best Group, Best Album, Best Pop/Rock Album and Best Song for "F-F-F-Falling".

=== 2003–2010: Dead Letters, Hide from the Sun and Black Roses ===
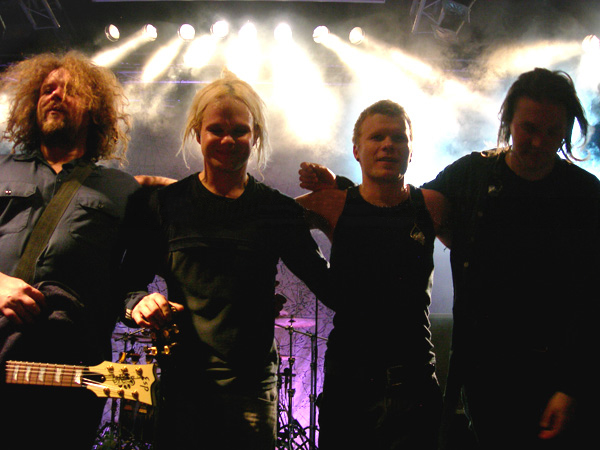
The Rasmus in 2009. From left to right: Rantasalmi, Ylönen, Hakala and Heinonen

On 21 March 2003, The Rasmus released their fifth studio album, Dead Letters. Dead Letters sold over 2 million copies worldwide and signified the band's major breakthrough, receiving 8 Gold and 6 platinum music certification awards. Lead single "In the Shadows" received 6 gold and 2 platinum awards, selling over 1 million copies and breaking the record for performance royalties received abroad on a Finnish composition (overtaking the works of Jean Sibelius). The commercial success of the album saw the band receiving numerous music awards across Europe, winning the 'Best Nordic Act' category in the 2003 MTV Europe Music Awards, and five Finnish EMMA awards for Best Group, Best Album, Best Video (In My Life), Best Artist and Export in 2004. They also won an ECHO award for best international newcomer and were awarded "Best International Artist" at the 2004 MTV Russia Music Awards. "In the Shadows" was on the nominations list for the 2004 Kerrang! Award for Best Single. Such success led to extensive touring around the world. In 2004 they released their first live DVD Live Letters which was filmed at Gampel Open Air in Switzerland on 21 August 2004.

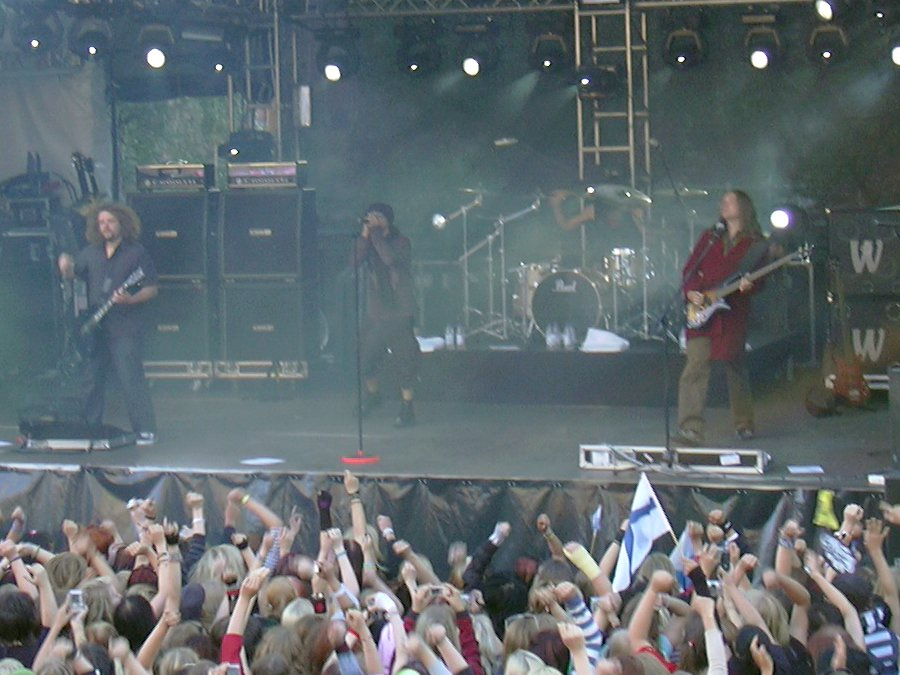
The Rasmus in concert in Tampere, 2006

On 12 September 2005, The Rasmus released their sixth studio album, Hide from the Sun. The album received Platinum status in Finland and sold more than 15,000 copies in the UK alone. Overall, Hide from the Sun sold over 500,000 copies worldwide. The band received a nomination for 'Best Rock Band' at the 2006 Eska Awards, and performed at the ceremony. They were also nominated in the 'Rock Album of the Year', 'Song of the Year' (No Fear), 'Best Finnish Band' categories at the EMMA awards 2006. Bassist Eero Heinonen released his solo album Making Waves with his side project Hay & Stone on 20 September 2006.

The Rasmus continued their extensive touring throughout 2007. The band met Desmond Child in Dominican Republic, who began working with the band on producing their seventh studio album. 2007 also marked the start of Eero Heinonen's career as a music video director.

Black Roses was released on 24 September 2008. It immediately replaced Metallica's Death Magnetic at the top of the Finnish Album Charts and went Gold after one week.

The album was originally planned to be released in March that year, but was delayed due to new songs the band still wanted to record, including the lead single, "Livin' in a World Without You". The album's sound is generally less heavy than that of Hide from the Sun. However, a few of the album's songs, such as "Ten Black Roses", "The Fight", and "Lost and Lonely", contain symphonic rock/metal elements. The album spawned a second single "Justify" in 2009. Black Roses sold over 400,000 copies worldwide.

On 28 November 2009 they released their second compilation album, Best of 2001–2009, featuring songs recorded between 2001 and 2009. While most of the songs were already released, it features a new unreleased song called "October & April" which features vocals by Anette Olzon. This song was recorded during the same time as Black Roses, but wasn't included as it did not follow the album concept.

In early 2010, The Rasmus started working on their next album, which would be released by the band's personal record label due to their contract with their previous label dissolving at the end of 2009.

=== 2011–2021: Lauri's solo project, The Rasmus and Dark Matters ===
On 30 March 2011, Lauri Ylönen released his solo album New World, with the first single "Heavy" being released in February of that year. The material premiered the annual EMMA Gala on 26 February 2011. Ylönen stated that he wanted several songs that did not fit The Rasmus to be released as a major record rather than a demo. The album was self-produced with their record label Dynasty Recordings. The album charted at a peak of No.2 on the Finnish album charts. In 2011 the band signed a contract with Universal Music Finland. Shortly after, The Rasmus began producing their eighth studio album, lead singer Lauri Ylönen claimed they were aiming to revisit the sound of one of their earlier albums, Into. The album's lead single "I'm a Mess" was first performed on 25 February 2012 during the Finnish national selection for the Eurovision Song Contest 2012, and was also the official song for the 2012 European Athletics Championships. The band's eighth studio album was announced to be self-titled, and was released on 18 April 2012 in several European countries. "Stranger", the second single from the album, was released on 15 May 2012. The album was re-issued as The Rasmus tour edition in autumn 2012, and featured the addition of the single "Mysteria". The self-titled album later won two EMMA awards for "Best album cover" & "Best music video (I'm a Mess)".

In September and October 2016, the Rasmus posted updates from the studio showing them recording a ninth studio album, Dark Matters, was released on 6 October 2017. The first single from the album, "Paradise", was released on 31 March 2017.

On 17 August 2018, it was announced via the official Facebook page that a new single will be released titled 'Holy Grail' on 14 September.

On 10 October 2019, whilst playing the Dead Letters Anniversary Tour at Rock City in Nottingham, Ylönen announced that the band had been working on new music for a possible future release.

=== 2022–present: Eurovision Song Contest, Rise and Weirdo ===
On 12 January 2022, the band was announced as one of the competing entrants in the Finnish national selection for the Eurovision Song Contest 2022, with the song "Jezebel" written by Ylönen and Desmond Child. The band stated in an interview that their decision to participate was due to the COVID-19 pandemic cancelling all of their tours and performances, try something new, and allow the group to bond even more. The release marks also the first Rasmus song with new guitarist Emilia "Emppu" Suhonen, who replaced longtime guitarist and founding member Pauli Rantasalmi, who left for personal reasons.

The band would eventually go on to win the Finnish national selection competition, thus earning the right to represent Finland in the contest in Turin, Italy, where they placed 21st with 38 points. The band's tenth album Rise was released on 23 September 2022.

Weirdo is the eleventh studio album by the Finnish rock band the Rasmus, released on 12 September 2025 by Better Noise Music and Playground Music Scandinavia.

== Music videos ==
The Rasmus have released a total of twenty music videos. Niklas Fronda and Fredrik Löfberg of Baranga Film have directed three of the band's videos, all from the Dead Letters album. Dead Letters is the album with most music videos: seven videos have been released from that album, including three versions of "In the Shadows". The videos of "Immortal" and "Your Forgiveness" were directed by bassist Eero Heinonen. The first video they ever made was for "Funky Jam" in 1996.

== Band members ==
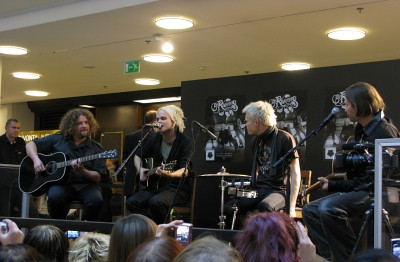
The Rasmus in 2008

Current members

- Lauri Ylönen – vocals, occasional acoustic guitar (1994–present)
- Eero Heinonen – bass, backing vocals (1994–present)
- Aki Hakala – drums (1999–present)
- Emilia "Emppu" Suhonen – guitar, vocals (2022–present)

Former members

- Jarno Lahti – drums (1994–1995)
- Janne Heiskanen – drums (1995–1999; died 2022)
- Pauli Rantasalmi – guitar (1994–2022), backing vocals (1994–1999)

Timeline

== Discography ==
=== Studio albums ===
- Peep (1996)
- Playboys (1997)
- Hell of a Tester (1998)
- Into (2001)
- Dead Letters (2003)
- Hide from the Sun (2005)
- Black Roses (2008)
- The Rasmus (2012)
- Dark Matters (2017)
- Rise (2022)
- Weirdo (2025)

== Tours ==
| Years | Tour | Countries | Cities | Concerts |
|---|---|---|---|---|
| 2003 | Dead Letters Tour | 29 | 107 | 296 |
| 2005 | Hide from the Sun Tour | 36 | 110 | 249 |
| 2009 | Black Roses Tour | | | |
| 2012 | The Rasmus Tour | | | |
| 2017 | Dark Matters Tour | | | 69 |
| 2019 | Dead Letters Anniversary Tour | 18 | 31 | 31 |
| 2022 | Live And Never Die 22 | 11 | 21 | 21 |
| 2025 | Weirdo Tour | | | |

== Dynasty ==
The Rasmus were part of a brotherhood of Finnish bands known as "Dynasty", along with the hip-hop band Kwan and the now-separated modern rock band Killer. Dynasty also have a studio in Helsinki, where they recruit new Finnish talent. Several members of Dynasty have tattoos with the Dynasty text; one can be found on Pauli's left and Lauri's right arm. Pauli and Eero also have instruments and gear bearing the Dynasty logo. Pauli has helped with the production of Kwan, winning an EMMA for Producer of the Year in 2001.

== See also ==
- List of best-selling music artists in Finland

Awards and achievements
| Preceded by Blind Channel with "Dark Side" | Finland in the Eurovision Song Contest; 2022 | Succeeded by Käärijä with "Cha Cha Cha" |
