= Playground Music Scandinavia =

Swedish record label

Playground Music Scandinavia AB
- Founded: 1999; 27 years ago
- Genre: Various
- Country of origin: Sweden
- Location: Denmark, Finland, Norway, Sweden
- Official website: playgroundmusic.com

Playground Music Scandinavia AB (PGM) is an independent record company from Scandinavia, founded in 1999. The company operates across Scandinavia with offices in Sweden, Denmark, Finland, and Norway. Additionally, it has established local distribution partnerships in Estonia, Latvia, Lithuania, and Iceland.

Since 2010, Jonas Sjöström has held ownership of the company. Playground Music works with multiple music genres, including pop and rock music.

The company also acts as a representative for various international independent labels, including Beggars Banquet, 4AD, Domino, Matador, XL Recordings, Mute, Cooking Vinyl, Secretly Canadian, City Slang, Ninja Tune, Ignition, and Epitaph.

== History ==
Playground Music Scandinavia was founded in 1999 after Jonas Sjöström and several colleagues left the record company MNW (Music Network Corps AB) in protest of their new owners. From the start, Playground Music set up offices in Sweden, Norway, Denmark and Finland. Of the company's first direct signings, The Rasmus managed to launch a successful international career with the release of their album Dead Letters (2003). The same year, the company acquired Ace of Base's complete musical catalog with the acquisition of the Danish record label Mega Records. In 2006, the company bought the Swedish label Diesel Music, acquiring the catalog of artists such as Lisa Nilsson, Koop, Eagle-Eye Cherry, Mauro Scocco and Titiyo. In 2010, the main shareholder of the company Edel SE & Co. KGaA sold their share of the company to Jonas Sjöström, thereby making him the sole owner of Playground Music Scandinavia.

== Selected artists ==
Artists currently signed to Playground Music include:

- Ace of Base
- Bror Gunnar Jansson
- Daniel Kvammen
- Dina Ögon
- Eagle-Eye Cherry
- Erato
- Hooja
- Jakob
- Smith & Thell
- José González
- Agnes
- Leila K
- Ken Ring
- Eagle-Eye Cherry
- Miss Li
- Koop
- Lisa Nilsson
- The Rasmus
- Mando Diao

Examples of artists distributed by Playground Music:

- Adele
- The xx
- Poets Of The Fall
- The Prodigy
- Cat Power
- Marilyn Manson
- Bon Iver
- Apulanta
- Mike Sheridan
- Arctic Monkeys
- M83
