= List of UK Rock & Metal Singles Chart number ones of 2006 =

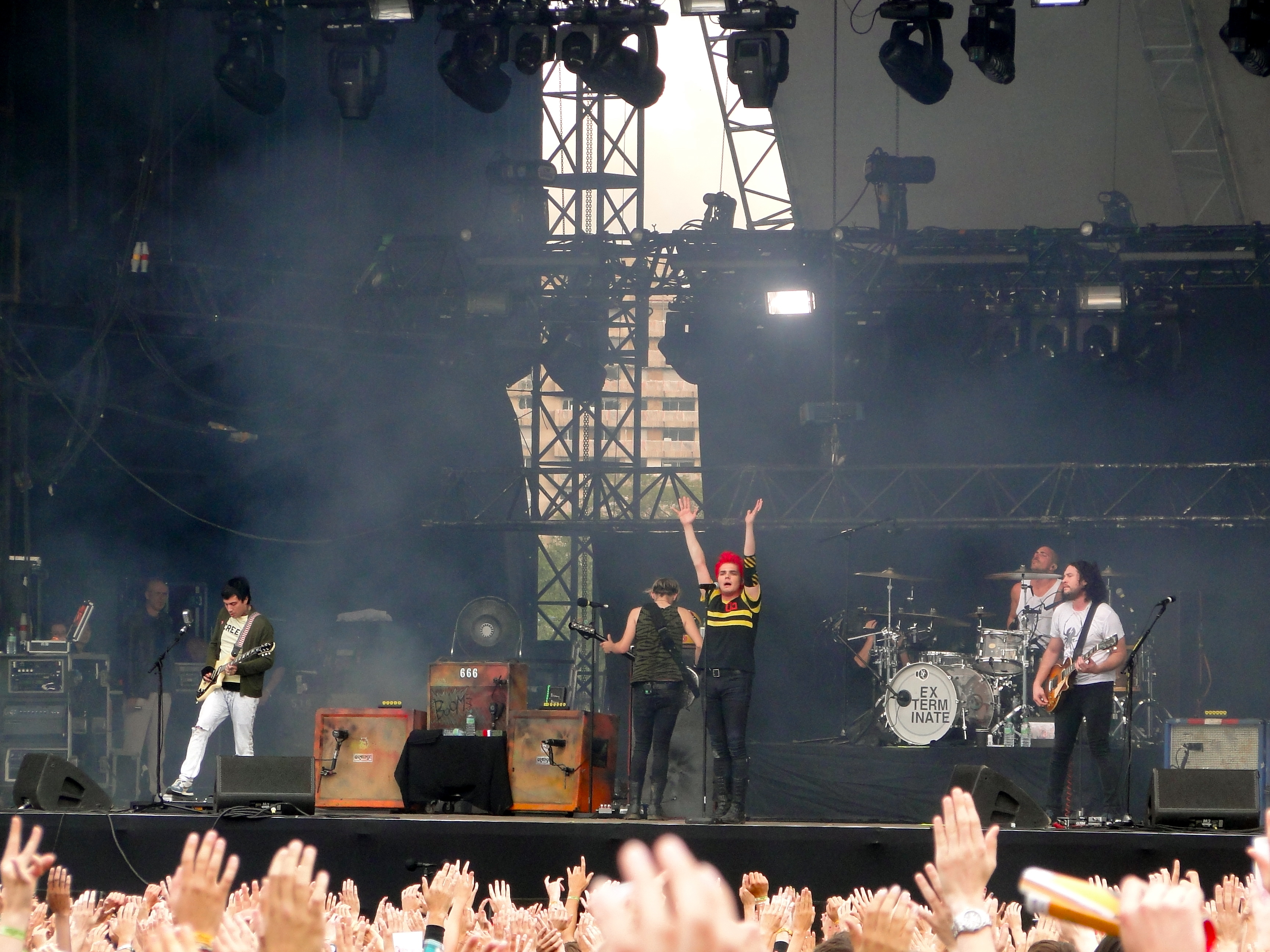
"Welcome to the Black Parade" by My Chemical Romance was the longest-running number one of 2006, spending nine weeks atop the chart.

The UK Rock & Metal Singles Chart is a record chart which ranks the best-selling rock and heavy metal songs in the United Kingdom. Compiled and published by the Official Charts Company, the data is based on each track's weekly physical sales, digital downloads and streams. In 2006, there were 24 singles that topped the 52 published charts. The first number-one single of the year was "One Way Ticket", the lead single from One Way Ticket to Hell... and Back, the second album by The Darkness, which spent the first four weeks of the year at number one as part of a ten-week run which began in November 2005. The final number-one single of the year was "Welcome to the Black Parade", the lead single from My Chemical Romance's third album The Black Parade, which spent the last two weeks of the year atop the chart.

The most successful song on the UK Rock & Metal Singles Chart in 2006 was "Welcome to the Black Parade" by My Chemical Romance, which spent nine weeks at number one including a run of seven consecutive weeks. "Tell Me Baby" by Red Hot Chili Peppers spent five weeks at number one, while singles by The Darkness ("One Way Ticket"), Lacuna Coil ("Our Truth") and Muse ("Supermassive Black Hole" and "Starlight") all spent four weeks at number one. Four singles – "Is It Just Me?" by The Darkness, "But It's Better If You Do" by Panic! at the Disco, "Hard Rock Hallelujah" by Lordi and "Knights of Cydonia" by Muse – each spent two weeks at number one on the chart. Muse were the most successful artist on the UK Rock & Metal Singles Chart in 2006, spending a total of ten weeks at number one across three different singles.

== Chart history ==
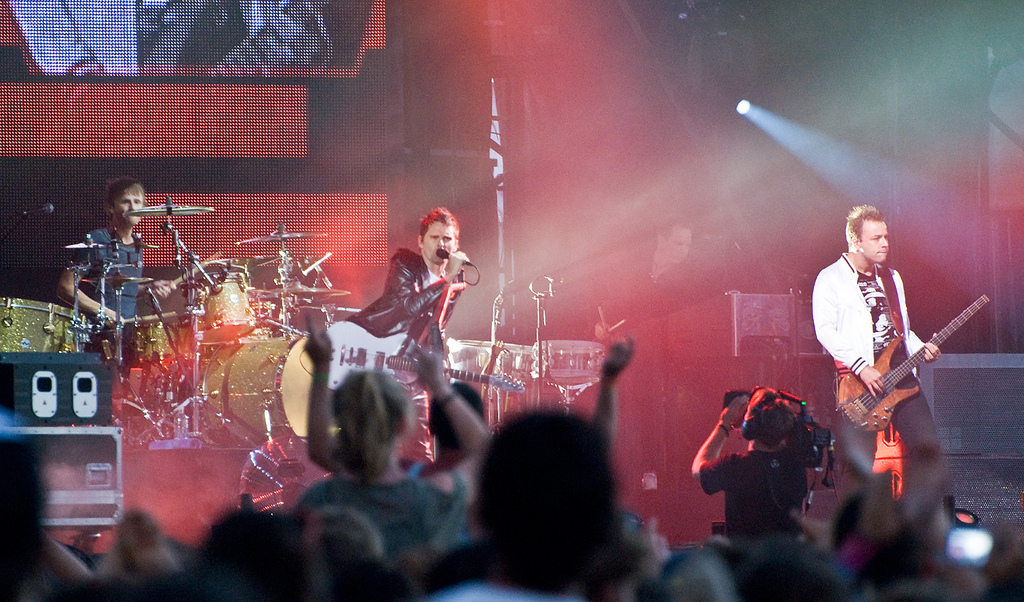
Muse were the most successful band on the chart in 2006, spending ten weeks at number one with "Supermassive Black Hole", "Starlight" (four weeks each) and "Knights of Cydonia" (two weeks).

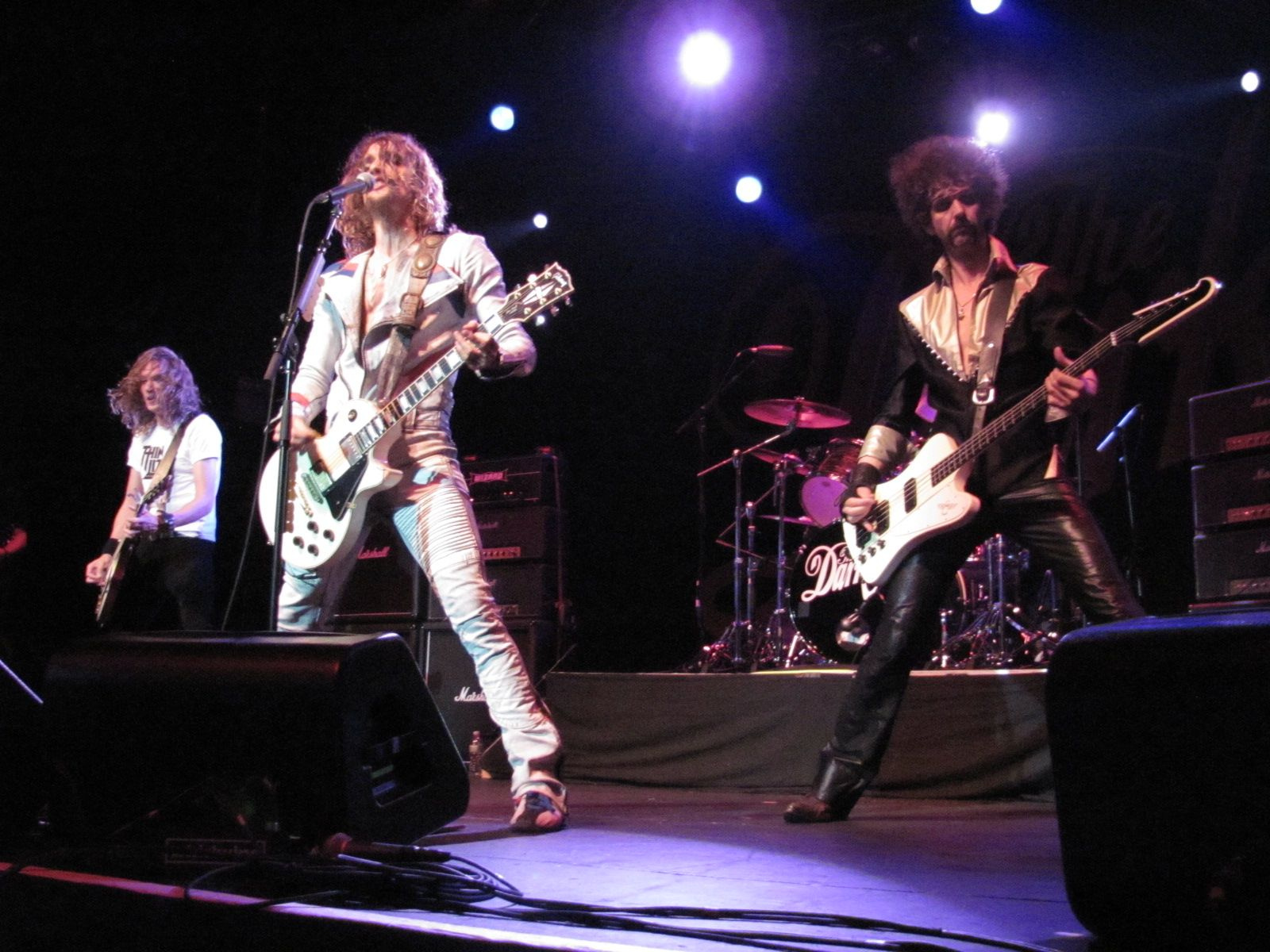
The Darkness spent seven weeks at number one, topping the chart with "One Way Ticket" (four weeks), "Is It Just Me?" (two weeks) and "Girlfriend" (one week).

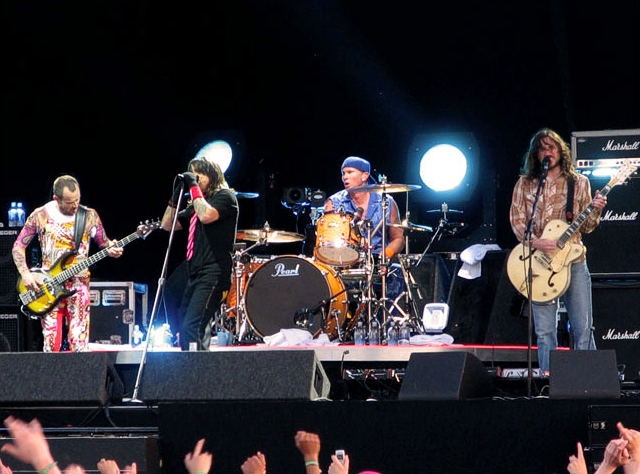
Red Hot Chili Peppers spent five weeks at number one with "Tell Me Baby".

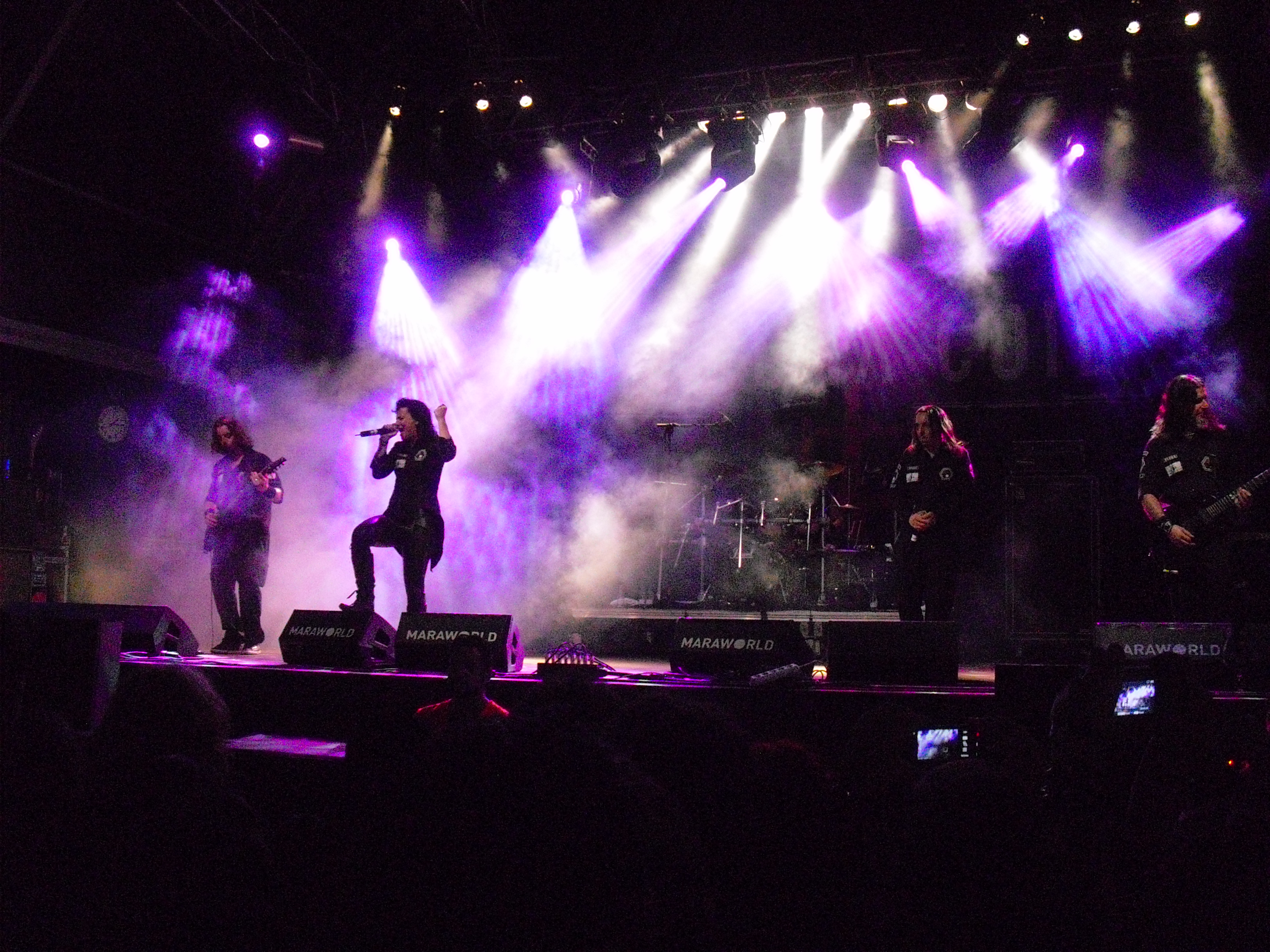
Lacuna Coil's "Our Truth" was number one for four weeks in April 2006.

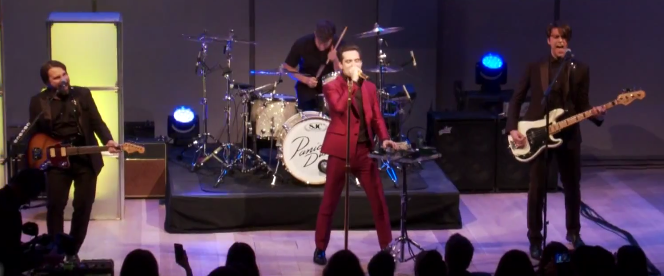
Panic! at the Disco spent two weeks at number one with "But It's Better If You Do".

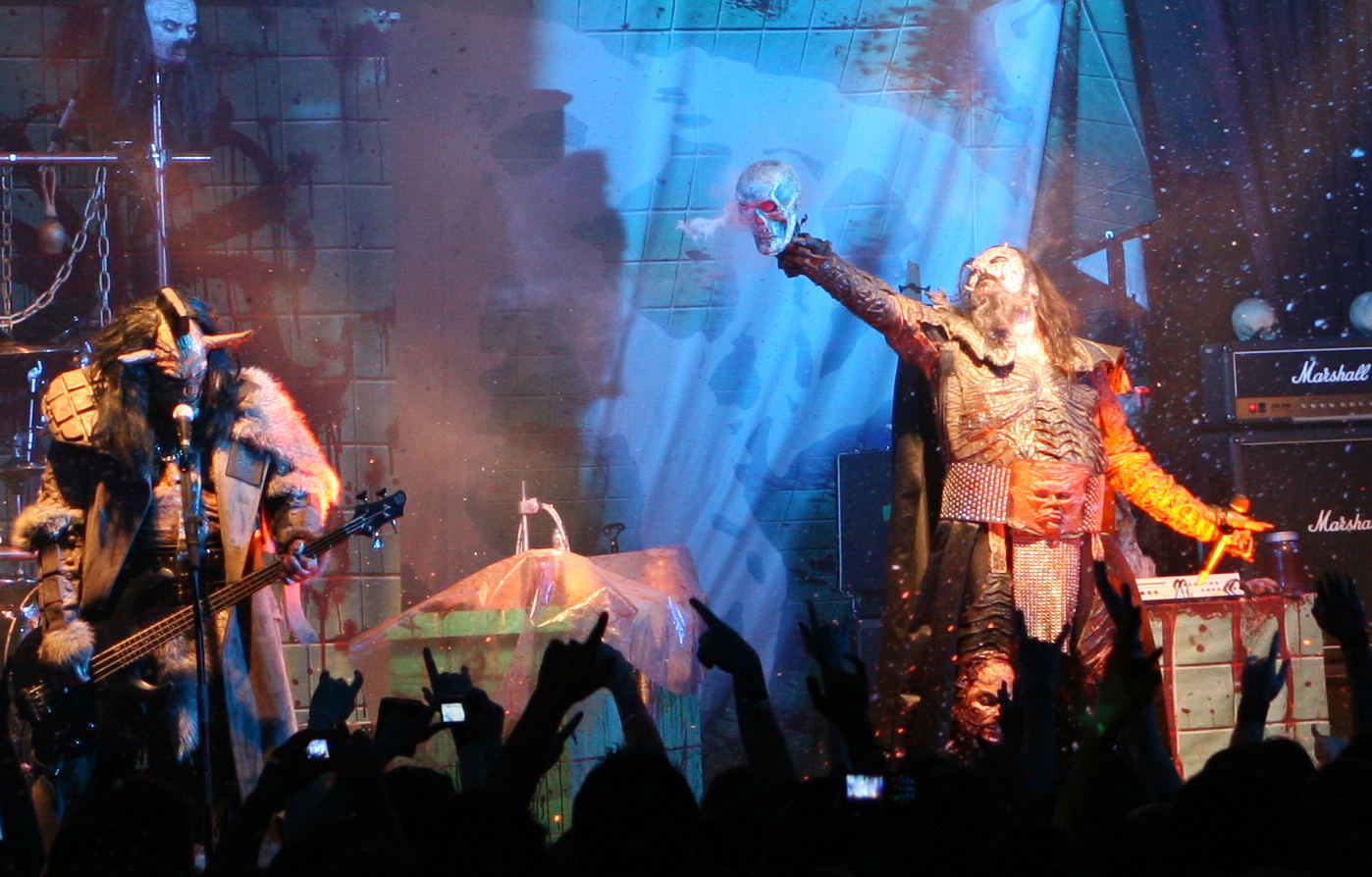
Lordi's "Hard Rock Hallelujah" was number one for two weeks in June.

| Issue date | Single | Artist(s) | Record label(s) | Ref. |
|---|---|---|---|---|
| 7 January | "One Way Ticket" | The Darkness | Atlantic | |
| 14 January | "One Way Ticket" | The Darkness | Atlantic | |
| 21 January | "One Way Ticket" | The Darkness | Atlantic | |
| 28 January | "One Way Ticket" | The Darkness | Atlantic | |
| 4 February | "In Your Face" | Children of Bodom | Universal | |
| 11 February | "A Day in the Life of a Poolshark" | Idiot Pilot | Reprise | |
| 18 February | "Superchannel" | The Alarm | Liberty | |
| 25 February | "Far Away" | Nickelback | Roadrunner | |
| 4 March | "Is It Just Me?" | The Darkness | Atlantic | |
| 11 March | "Is It Just Me?" | The Darkness | Atlantic | |
| 18 March | "Beast and the Harlot" | Avenged Sevenfold | Warner Bros. | |
| 25 March | "No Way Back/Cold Day in the Sun" | Foo Fighters | RCA | |
| 1 April | "Our Truth" | Lacuna Coil | Century Media | |
| 8 April | "Our Truth" | Lacuna Coil | Century Media | |
| 15 April | "Our Truth" | Lacuna Coil | Century Media | |
| 22 April | "Our Truth" | Lacuna Coil | Century Media | |
| 29 April | "Dimension" | Wolfmother | Modular | |
| 6 May | "Killing Loneliness" | HIM | Sire | |
| 13 May | "But It's Better If You Do" | Panic! at the Disco | Atlantic | |
| 20 May | "But It's Better If You Do" | Panic! at the Disco | Atlantic | |
| 27 May | "Overrated (Everything Is)" | Less Than Jake | Sire | |
| 3 June | "Girlfriend" | The Darkness | Atlantic | |
| 10 June | "MakeDamnSure" | Taking Back Sunday | Warner Bros. | |
| 17 June | "Hard Rock Hallelujah" | Lordi | RCA | |
| 24 June | "Hard Rock Hallelujah" | Lordi | RCA | |
| 1 July | "Supermassive Black Hole" | Muse | A&E | |
| 8 July | "Supermassive Black Hole" | Muse | A&E | |
| 15 July | "Supermassive Black Hole" | Muse | A&E | |
| 22 July | "Supermassive Black Hole" | Muse | A&E | |
| 29 July | "Tell Me Baby" | Red Hot Chili Peppers | Warner Bros. | |
| 5 August | "Tell Me Baby" | Red Hot Chili Peppers | Warner Bros. | |
| 12 August | "Tell Me Baby" | Red Hot Chili Peppers | Warner Bros. | |
| 19 August | "Tell Me Baby" | Red Hot Chili Peppers | Warner Bros. | |
| 26 August | "Tell Me Baby" | Red Hot Chili Peppers | Warner Bros. | |
| 2 September | "Twenty-Twenty Surgery" | Taking Back Sunday | Warner Bros. | |
| 9 September | "The Rest of My Life" | Less Than Jake | Sire | |
| 16 September | "Starlight" | Muse | Helium 3/Warner Bros. | |
| 23 September | "Starlight" | Muse | Helium 3/Warner Bros. | |
| 30 September | "Starlight" | Muse | Helium 3/Warner Bros. | |
| 7 October | "Starlight" | Muse | Helium 3/Warner Bros. | |
| 14 October | "Anthem (We Are the Fire)" | Trivium | Roadrunner | |
| 21 October | "Welcome to the Black Parade" | My Chemical Romance | Reprise | |
| 28 October | "Welcome to the Black Parade" | My Chemical Romance | Reprise | |
| 4 November | "Welcome to the Black Parade" | My Chemical Romance | Reprise | |
| 11 November | "Welcome to the Black Parade" | My Chemical Romance | Reprise | |
| 18 November | "Welcome to the Black Parade" | My Chemical Romance | Reprise | |
| 25 November | "Welcome to the Black Parade" | My Chemical Romance | Reprise | |
| 2 December | "Welcome to the Black Parade" | My Chemical Romance | Reprise | |
| 9 December | "Knights of Cydonia" | Muse | Helium 3/Warner Bros. | |
| 16 December | "Knights of Cydonia" | Muse | Helium 3/Warner Bros. | |
| 23 December | "Welcome to the Black Parade" | My Chemical Romance | Reprise | |
| 30 December | "Welcome to the Black Parade" | My Chemical Romance | Reprise | |

== See also ==
- 2006 in British music
- List of UK Rock & Metal Albums Chart number ones of 2006
