= Don't Drink the Water (Stone Gods song) =

"Don't Drink The Water"

Single by Stone Gods

from the album Silver Spoons & Broken Bones
- B-side: "Making it hard [live]"; "Knight of the Living Dead [live]"
- Released: 26 October 2008 (Download); 27 October 2008 (CD)
- Genre: Hard rock Heavy metal
- Length: 10 min 18 s
- Label: Self-released
- Songwriter(s): Dan Hawkins; Richie Edwards; Toby MacFarlaine; Ed Graham
- Producer(s): Dan Hawkins; Nick Brine

Stone Gods singles chronology
"Knight of the Living Dead" (2008)	"Don't Drink The Water" (2008)	"Start Of Something" (2009)

"Don't Drink the Water" is the third single from Stone Gods, and the second song on their debut album, Silver Spoons & Broken Bones. It was announced on 2 September 2008, on the official website blog, and released on 27 October 2008, and reached number 2 in the UK Rock Chart and 10 in the UK Indie Chart. Along with the title track came two B-sides, ("Making It Hard" and "Knight Of The Living Dead") recorded at Norwich Waterfront in June. They are both live.

The current Stone Gods drummer, Robin Goodridge, does not play on this single, as it was recorded before Ed Graham's departure.

The lyrics detail a man's holiday in Spain, not caring and relieving stress, with the title of the song referring to the warning phrase "Don't drink the water", used to deter foreign visitors from drinking water of which their metabolism may be unused to, causing illness.

== Music video ==
The music video is performed entirely in a small, dark room, in which there are a few bright lights, which occasionally pulse with the music. The band is dressed in dark colours, with frontman Richie wearing a leather jacket and a pair of trademark opaque Aviator sunglasses. The camera shots are all close, swaying around and brief, resting on an individual band member for only a few seconds, and many close-ups of guitars. The video is six seconds longer than the studio track, due to the silence at the beginning of the video.

== Track listing ==
CD Single; all songs written by Dan Hawkins, Ritchie Edwards, Toby MacFarlaine and Ed Graham.

1. "Don't Drink The Water" - 2:47
2. "Making It Hard (Live)" - 3:56
3. "Knight Of The Living Dead (Live)" - 4:22
