= Burn the Witch (EP) =

Burn the Witch EP

EP by Stone Gods
- Released: 25 February 2008
- Genre: Hard rock
- Length: 14:34
- Label: Self-released
- Producer: Dan Hawkins & Nick Brine

Stone Gods chronology
Burn the Witch EP (2008)	Silver Spoons & Broken Bones (2008)

Professional ratings
Review scores
Source	Rating
Kerrang!	3/5 stars

Burn the Witch is the first Limited edition EP by Stone Gods. It was released on 25 February 2008. According to the official Stone Gods website, the EP sold out within one day.

The first two tracks also appear on the full-length LP, Silver Spoons & Broken Bones.

== Track listing ==
1. "Burn the Witch" - (Hawkins/Edwards/MacFarlaine/Graham) - 4:46
2. "You Brought a Knife to a Gunfight" - (Hawkins/Edwards) - 3:08
3. "Breakdown" - (Hawkins) - 3:24
4. "Heartburn" - (Hawkins) - 3:16

== Personnel ==
- Richie Edwards – lead and backing vocals, rhythm guitar
- Dan Hawkins – lead guitar
- Toby MacFarlaine – bass guitar
- Ed Graham – drums
