= Blind Man (The Darkness song) =

Song by The Darkness

from the album One Way Ticket to Hell... and Back
- Released: 2005
- Recorded: 2005
- Genre: Hard rock
- Length: 3:34
- Label: Atlantic
- Songwriter(s): Dan Hawkins, Justin Hawkins
- Producer(s): Roy Thomas Baker

"Blind Man" is a song by the English rock band The Darkness.

== Background and release history ==
The song is about a sad blind man who is living his last days.

It is the tenth and final track in the band's sophomore album One Way Ticket to Hell... and Back and it was recorded at Chapel Studios, South Thoresby, Lincolnshire; Paul Smith Music Studios, London.

=== Release history ===
The song has been released in three different albums:

On 28 November 2005 on the band's second album One Way Ticket to Hell... and Back.

On 1 April 2008 in the first compilation album "The Platinum Collection".

On 4 August 2008 in the second compilation album "2 in 1: Permission to Land/One Way Ticket to Hell".

== Critical reception ==
AllMusic criticized the song saying that it sounds too much like stale Meat Loaf.

Pitchfork Media commented that Baker makes like Michael Kamen in conducting orchestral embellishments to Seemed Like a Good Idea at the Time or Blind Man, but nothing hits the November Rain epic heights the band so desperately wants to reach.

Prefixmag called the song an "orchestral schlock".

Drowned in Sound stated that the song "is the acoustic power pop outro to a Hollywood movie where The Darkness take over the planet."

== Personnel ==
- Justin Hawkins – vocals, lead and rhythm guitar, synthesizer, piano
- Dan Hawkins – rhythm and lead guitar
- Frankie Poullain – bass
- Ed Graham – drums

Additional personnel

- Pedro Ferreira – production, mixing, engineering
- Mike Marsh – mastering
- Will Bartle – recording assistance
- Nick Taylor – mixing assistance
