= Nothing Can Stop Us =

Nothing Can Stop Us may refer to:

- Nothing Can Stop Us (album), by Robert Wyatt
- "Nothing Can Stop Us" (song), by Saint Etienne

== See also ==
- "Nothing Can Stop Us Now", a song from the Mickey & Minnie's Runaway Railway ride in Florida, United States
- "Nothing's Gonna Stop Us", a song by British rock band, The Darkness
- "Nothing's Gonna Stop Us Now", a song recorded by the American rock band Starship in 1986
