= Blind Man =

Blind Man may refer to:

- The Blind Man, an art and Dada journal published briefly by the New York Dadaists in 1917
- Blind Man (Aerosmith song), 1994
- Blind Man (The Darkness song), 2005
- Blind Man (Black Stone Cherry song), 2008
- Blind Man (film), 2012 French film
- "Blind Man", a song by Bobby Bland
- "Blind Man", a song by Trife Diesel from Better Late Than Never
- "Blind Man", a 1965 single by Little Milton
- The Blind Man (painting), 1910 painting by Gustave Van de Woestyne
