= Is It Just Me? (song) =

2006 single by the Darkness

Single by the Darkness

from the album One Way Ticket to Hell... And Back
- B-side: "Shake (Like a Lettuce Leaf)"; "Shit Ghost"
- Released: 20 February 2006
- Length: 3:07
- Label: Atlantic
- Songwriters: Justin Hawkins, Dan Hawkins, Frankie Poullain
- Producer: Roy Thomas Baker

The Darkness singles chronology
"One Way Ticket" (2005)	"Is It Just Me?" (2006)	"Girlfriend" (2006)

"Is It Just Me?" is a song by British rock the Darkness, taken as the second single from their second studio album, One Way Ticket to Hell... And Back (2005). The single was released on 20 February 2006 and was the band's fifth consecutive top-10 hit in the United Kingdom, peaking at No. 8 on the UK Singles Chart. It also reached No. 36 in Ireland and No. 39 in Australia. The music video for the song features a parody of the popular Flake girl advert, which was a popular advertisement for the chocolate bar. It also features psychedelic rock star Arthur Brown as the priest, who is marrying Justin Hawkins to himself.

== Track listings ==
- CD single
1. "Is It Just Me?" – 3:05
2. "Shake (Like a Lettuce Leaf)" – 3:19
- 7-inch vinyl
1. "Is It Just Me?" – 3:15
2. "Shit Ghost" – 2:48
- Australian CD single
1. "Is It Just Me?" – 3:15
2. "Shit Ghost" – 2:48
3. "Shake (Like a Lettuce Leaf)" – 3:19
4. "Is It Just Me?" (music video) – 3:15
- DVD single
1. "Is It Just Me?" (music video) – 3:15
2. "Is It Just Me?" (making of the video) – 2:00
3. "Is It Just Me?" (audio) – 3:05
4. "Shit Ghost" – 2:48
- Digital download
1. "Is It Just Me?" – 3:05
- Digital single
1. "Is It Just Me?" – 3:05
2. "Shake (Like a Lettuce Leaf)" – 3:19

== Charts ==
Chart (2006)	Peak position
Australia (ARIA)	39
Ireland (IRMA)	36
Scotland Singles (OCC)	9
UK Singles (OCC)	8
UK Rock & Metal (OCC)	1

== Release history ==
Region	Date	Format(s)	Label(s)	Ref.
United Kingdom	20 February 2006	CD	Atlantic	
Australia	10 April 2006	CD	Atlantic	
