= Silver Spoons & Broken Bones =

Studio album by Stone Gods
- Released: 7 July 2008 (UK)
- Recorded: January 2007 – August 2007
- Studio: Leeders Farm, Norwich, England
- Genre: Hard rock
- Length: 49:38
- Label: Play It Again Sam
- Producer: Dan Hawkins; Nick Brine

Stone Gods chronology
| Burn the Witch EP (2008) | Silver Spoons & Broken Bones (2008) |

Singles from Silver Spoons & Broken Bones
- 1. "Burn the Witch" Released: 24 February 2008; 2. "Knight of the Living Dead" Released: 22 June 2008; 3. "Don't Drink the Water" Released: 26 October 2008; 4. "Start of Something" Released: 22 March 2009

Professional ratings
Review scores
| Source | Rating |
|---|---|
| allmusic link | 3.5/5 stars |
| Kerrang! | 4/5 stars |
| Metal Hammer | 8/10 stars |
| Thrash Hits link | 4.5/6 stars |
| Total Guitar | 4/5 stars |
| Ultimate-Guitar | 10/10 stars |

Silver Spoons & Broken Bones is the only studio album by East Anglian band Stone Gods and was released on July 7, 2008 through Play It Again Sam. It is the band's first full-length album. Two of the songs, "Burn the Witch" and "You Brought a Knife to a Gunfight", were previously released on the limited edition Burn the Witch EP.

The album started pretty much from day one of Stone Gods. After forming, they wrote around 35 songs during the making of the album. It was recorded at Dan Hawkins's home studio, Leeders Farm.

The first single from the album, "Knight of the Living Dead", was released on 23 June 2008. The album was leaked nearly a month early, on 12 June 2008. The second single from the album "Don't Drink The Water" was released on 27 October 2008. The next single release was "Start of Something".

They supported Airbourne and Black Stone Cherry on UK tours.

== Track listing ==
Standard edition
| No. | Title | Writer(s) | Length |
|---|---|---|---|
| 1. | "Burn the Witch" | Hawkins • Edwards • Graham • MacFarlaine | 4:44 |
| 2. | "Don't Drink the Water" | Hawkins • Edwards • Graham • MacFarlaine | 2:47 |
| 3. | "Defend or Die" | Hawkins • Edwards • Graham • MacFarlaine | 4:58 |
| 4. | "You Brought a Knife to a Gunfight" | Hawkins • Edwards | 3:07 |
| 5. | "Magdalene Street" | Hawkins • Edwards | 3:56 |
| 6. | "Where You Comin' From" | Hawkins • Edwards • MacFarlaine | 3:12 |
| 7. | "Lazy Bones" | MacFarlaine | 3:57 |
| 8. | "I'm With the Band" | Hawkins • Edwards • Graham | 4:16 |
| 9. | "Start of Something" | Hawkins • Edwards • Graham | 3:29 |
| 10. | "Making It Hard" | Hawkins • Edwards • Graham • MacFarlaine | 3:12 |
| 11. | "Wasting Time" | Hawkins • Edwards • Graham | 3:24 |
| 12. | "Knight of the Living Dead" | Hawkins • Edwards • Graham • MacFarlaine | 4:22 |
| 13. | "Oh Where 'O My Beero" | Hawkins • Edwards • Graham • MacFarlaine | 4:14 |

== Other tracks ==
- "Breakdown" (Appeared on "Burn the Witch (EP)") – 3:23
- "Heartburn" (Appeared on "Burn the Witch (EP)") – 4:12
- "Goodbye" (B-Side To "Knight of the Living Dead") – 4:30
- "Pretty Ugly" (B-Side To "Knight of the Living Dead") – 3:09

== Personnel ==
- Richie Edwards – lead vocals, rhythm guitar, acoustic guitar
- Dan Hawkins – lead guitar, piano, acoustic guitar, backing vocals
- Toby MacFarlaine – bass guitar, acoustic bass guitar, backing vocals
- Ed Graham – drums, percussion
- Phillip Wing – Tambourine
