= Don't Drink the Water =

Don't Drink the Water may refer to:

== Film, theatre, and television ==
- Don't Drink the Water (play), a 1966 play by Woody Allen
  - Don't Drink the Water (1969 film), a film adaptation of the play starring Jackie Gleason
  - Don't Drink the Water (1994 film), a television movie by Allen, adapted from his play
- Don't Drink the Water (TV series), a 1974–75 UK sitcom, a spin-off from On the Buses
- Don't Drink the Water (game show), a programme on the UK channel Challenge
- "Don't Drink the Water" (Alienators: Evolution Continues), a television episode
- "Don't Drink the Water" (Ben 10), a television episode

== Songs ==
- "Don't Drink the Water" (Dave Matthews Band song), 1998
- "Don't Drink the Water" (Stone Gods song), 2008
- "Don't Drink the Water", by Brad Paisley from This Is Country Music, 2011
- "Don't Drink the Water", by Colin Hay from Wayfaring Sons, 1990
- "Don't Drink the Water", by Joe Cocker from Cocker, 1986
- "Don't Drink the Water", by Justin Townes Earle from The Saint of Lost Causes, 2019
- "Don't Drink the Water", by Tears for Fears from Raoul and the Kings of Spain, 1995

== Other uses ==
- Don't Drink the Water, a 2006 album by Krum (recording as Playdough)
- "Don't Drink the Water", a short story by Jeffrey Archer included in his 2006 collection Cat O'Nine Tales
