= One Way Ticket (The Darkness song) =

2005 single by the Darkness

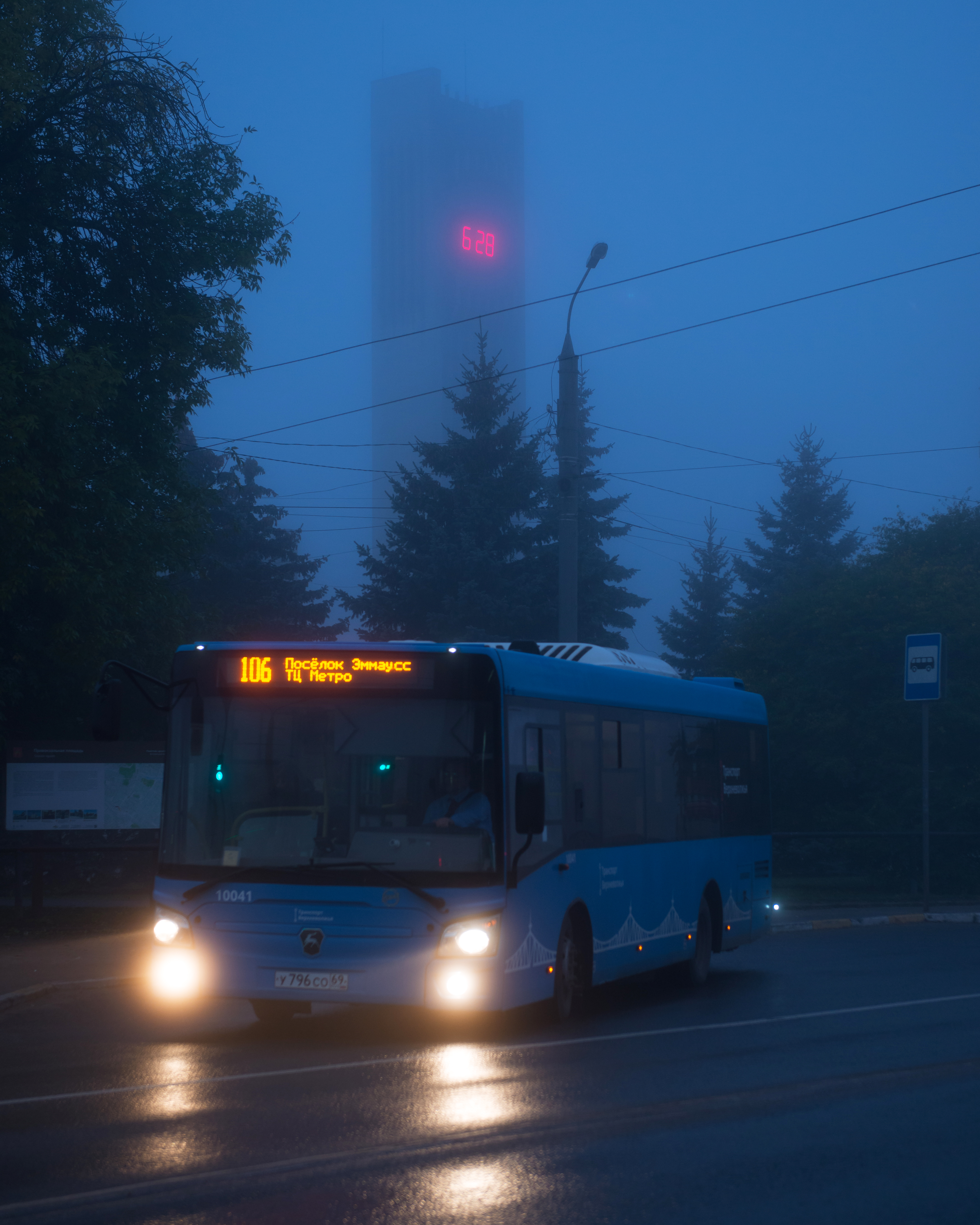

Single by the Darkness

from the album One Way Ticket to Hell... And Back
- B-side: "Wanker"; "Grief Hammer"
- Released: 14 November 2005
- Genre: Glam rock, hard rock
- Length: 4:28
- Label: Atlantic
- Songwriters: Justin Hawkins, Dan Hawkins, Frankie Poullain
- Producer: Roy Thomas Baker

The Darkness singles chronology
"Love Is Only a Feeling" (2004)	"One Way Ticket" (2005)	"Is It Just Me?" (2006)

"One Way Ticket" is the lead single from British rock band The Darkness' second studio album, One Way Ticket to Hell... And Back. It reached number eight on the UK Singles Chart. Its lyrics explicitly deal with cocaine use and addiction.

The beginning of the song features a pan flute solo, then a noise of one snorting cocaine, before the starting riff begins. The cover art features a stylised British Rail Aptis ticket, taken from their hometown of Lowestoft, in Suffolk, surrounded by fire.

== Track listings ==
- CD single
1. "One Way Ticket" (Explicit Album Edit) - 3:42
2. "Wanker" - 3:07
- Digital single 1
1. "One Way Ticket" (Explicit Album Edit) - 3:42
2. "Grief Hammer" - 3:12
- Digital single 2
1. "One Way Ticket" (Explicit Album Edit) - 3:42
2. "Wanker" - 3:07
- Digital download 1
1. "One Way Ticket" (Full Explicit Version) - 3:41
- Digital download 2
1. "One Way Ticket" (Radio Edit) - 3:29
- Digital download 3
1. "One Way Ticket" (Clean Album Edit) - 3:38
- German CD single
1. "One Way Ticket" (Explicit Album Edit) - 3:42
2. "Wanker" - 3:07
3. "Grief Hammer" - 3:12
4. "One Way Ticket" (Music Video) - 3:45
- DVD single
1. "One Way Ticket" (Music Video) - 3:45
2. "One Way Ticket" (Making of the Video) - 2:00
3. "One Way Ticket" (Explicit Album Edit) - 3:42
4. "Grief Hammer" - 3:12
- 7-inch vinyl 1
1. "One Way Ticket" (Explicit Album Edit) - 3:42
2. "Grief Hammer" - 3:12
- 7-inch vinyl 2
1. "One Way Ticket" (Explicit Album Edit) - 3:42
2. "Wanker" - 3:07

== Chart positions ==
Chart (2005–2006)	Peak position
Australia (ARIA)	36
Austria (Ö3 Austria Top 40)	62
Belgium (Ultratip Bubbling Under Flanders)	14
Canada Rock Top 30 (Radio & Records)	7
Denmark (Tracklisten)	20
Finland (Suomen virallinen lista)	14
Germany (GfK)	75
Ireland (IRMA)	22
Italy (FIMI)	28
New Zealand (Recorded Music NZ)	15
Norway (VG-lista)	19
Sweden (Sverigetopplistan)	31
UK Singles Chart	8
