= Red Light Fever =

Red Light Fever may refer to:

- "Red Light Fever", a song from Liz Phair's 2003 self-titled album
- Red Light Fever (Hot Leg album), 2009
- Red Light Fever (Taylor Hawkins and the Coattail Riders album), 2010
- "Red Light Fever", a song from Venom's Welcome to Hell
