= Beverlei Brown =

British R&B and soul singer

Beverlei Brown is a British R&B and soul singer. Brown gleaned her singing skills from her mother, who sang in her church's choir in Birmingham, England. When she was old enough, Brown sang with the choir and eventually became the leader.

She performed a solo with the Clark Sisters at the gospel wailers' UK concert and caught a sweet break with the Fine Young Cannibals, who needed some gospel singers for an album project; with Brown on board, the sessions were good enough to land FYC a record deal and Brown a gig on their worldwide promotional tour.

She returned to Birmingham after the expedition, finished school, and worked as a receptionist for a law office before accepting a touring gig with Ruby Turner that lasted two years. Her reputation grew quickly and Brown found work with Simply Red, Snap!, Joe Cocker, the Brand New Heavies, Babyface, Chaka Khan, and others.

The chance to cut a record came in 1996 via a Gary Benson/Livingston Brown song and production called "On and On", which was a UK club jam; a recorded album went unreleased when the record company went under. Dome Records representatives approached her two years later with a deal that resulted in relocation to London and hours of studio work. Brown co-wrote six tracks on her debut album Next to You; the selections include a duet, "Could Be You", cut in New Jersey with labelmate Dennis Taylor. The CD was a hot item in Japan; the UK version has three additional tracks.

== 2000s, Eurovision Song Contest ==
Brown recorded songs at the start of the 2000s such as "Part Time Lover", "Tell Me" and "Somebody Knows How You Feel" (UK No. 96), that all received some airplay on shows such as Trevor Nelson's Rhythm Nation on BBC Radio 1.

Brown sang a duet with Justin Hawkins on a song called "Ashamed" on Hot Leg's album Red Light Fever and also performed the additional vocals on the song "Cocktails".

In 2003, she recorded a lead vocal on the Full Flava's song "Love Holds No Limit", which was released on the Flava's studio album Colour of My Soul.

In 2007, Brown sang a duet with Justin Hawkins on "Making Your Mind Up", which was broadcast on the BBC, in the hope of representing the UK in Eurovision Song Contest 2007.

Brown worked on new material with Justin Hawkins and Alan Glass, among others.
