= Nothing's Gonna Stop Us =

Single by The Darkness

from the album Hot Cakes
- Released: 1 February 2012
- Length: 2:28
- Label: Must Destroy
- Songwriters: Justin Hawkins; Dan Hawkins; Chris McDougal
- Producer: Mike Fraser

The Darkness singles chronology
"Girlfriend" (2006)	"Nothing's Gonna Stop Us" (2012)	"Everybody Have a Good Time" (2012)

"Nothing's Gonna Stop Us" is a song by British rock band, The Darkness, released as a promotional single from their third studio album, Hot Cakes, released in February 2012.

== Background ==
"Nothing's Gonna Stop Us" is the band's first new single to be released since their split in 2006. The song features the original line-up of the band. The track was released via digital download on the band's official website on 1 February 2012. It is one of five new songs premiered on the group's two-stage 2011 and 2012 tour. The song was mixed by Chris "Frenchie" Smith for Worldsend America Inc, assisted by Jason Buntz

The song includes a sample of a line of dialogue from the 1980 British sword and sorcery film, 'Hawk The Slayer'. In the film the line in question is spoken by the main bad guy Voltan's adopted son, Drogo: "I am no messenger...but I will give you a message. The message of death."

== Music video ==
The music video for "Nothing's Gonna Stop Us" premiered online on 23 January 2012, at a total length of three minutes and three seconds. Directed by Thom Lessner and animated by Ted Passon, the video features a longer cut of the song, which features a news introduction in the starting scene. The video features a girl, who is shown as being a big fan of The Darkness, in her room listening to a radio broadcast, which states that all happiness has gone from the world, and that it has become boring. The video then becomes animated as the song begins. The four band members are shown in various scenes, including driving motorbikes down the Lowestoft promenade, past the beach huts, and through a city during the night.

== Track listing ==
- Digital download
1. "Nothing's Gonna Stop Us" – 2:28
- Promotional CD single #1
1. "Nothing's Gonna Stop Us" (Frenchie 2011 Mix) – 2:26
- Promotional CD single #2
1. "Nothing's Gonna Stop Us" – 2:28
2. "Nothing's Gonna Stop Us" (Instrumental) – 2:28
