= Stone Gods =

English rock band

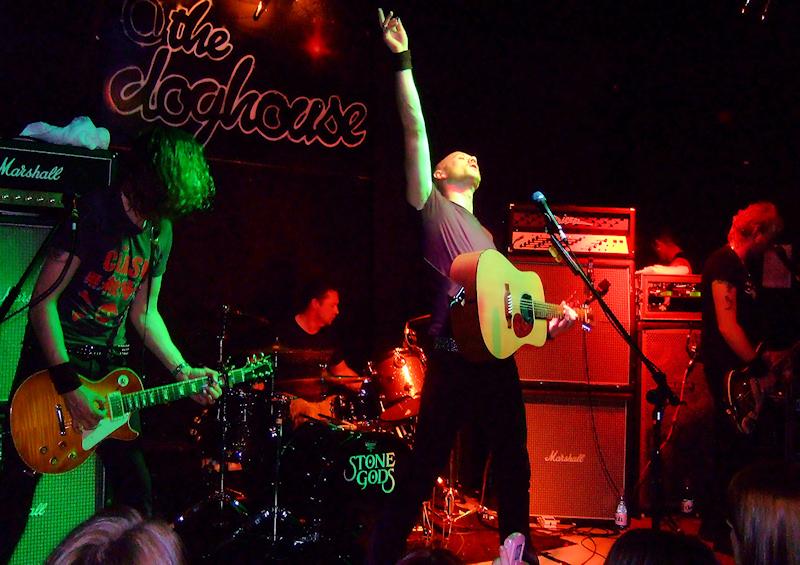
- Stone Gods performing in 2008

Background information
- Origin: East Anglia, England
- Genres: Hard rock
- Years active: 2006–2010
- Label: Play It Again Sam
- Past members: Richie Edwards; Dan Hawkins; Toby MacFarlaine; Ed Graham; Robin Goodridge

Stone Gods were a British hard rock band formed by former members of The Darkness in 2006. Their debut album, titled Silver Spoons & Broken Bones, was released in July 2008, with the first single "Knight of the Living Dead" being released in June 2008. In December 2010 they officially went on hiatus.

== History ==
=== Formation ===
When Justin Hawkins decided to leave The Darkness in October 2006, it meant the end of the band. However, guitarist, songwriter and brother of the lead singer Dan Hawkins, contacted bassist Richie Edwards within thirty minutes of finding out his brother was leaving, and asked him if he would be interested in taking up lead vocals in a new band with the remaining members. Edwards had previously sung lead vocals when the Darkness had covered AC/DC songs live, and he and Dan immediately started to think about a new musical direction. A new band was to be formed and Edwards indeed made the move from bass guitar to centre stage as lead vocalist/rhythm guitarist. The line up was completed by drummer Ed Graham (also of the Darkness) and bassist Toby MacFarlaine (who was a long time friend of Dan). The band spent the later part of 2006 and early 2007 writing and rehearsing new material and commenced recording their debut album soon after. No official announcement was made, the band's name was not revealed and the existence of the new band was only confirmed through postings on the band members personal MySpace sites during the period of the recordings. This was the only information available publicly for almost a year after the band had first formed.

=== Early activity and first EP (Burn the Witch) ===
In October 2007 the website of the UK music magazine Classic Rock leaked a news piece saying that a new band called Stone Gods had been added as a support act on the upcoming UK tour by Thin Lizzy, it was also stated in this news piece that this band was made up of ex-members of The Darkness. Then, on 9 November 2007, the website of the student union from the University of East Anglia announced a live date by a band that they claimed was the new band of former The Darkness guitarist Dan Hawkins and that the name of the band was Stone Gods. This news was confirmed by the launch of an official website a few days later and a string of support dates was announced for November and December 2007. These dates were unfortunately curtailed when firstly Richie Edwards succumbed to a throat infection after only three gigs had been performed and then, in a bizarre twist, dates with the Finnish classical/metal band Apocalyptica were cancelled due to 'lack of stage space'.

In January 2008 Stone Gods headlined their first proper tour in the UK and it was announced that a limited edition EP called Burn The Witch was to be released by independent label PIAS on 25 February 2008. The EP contained two tracks from the upcoming debut album – "Burn The Witch" and "You Brought A Knife to a Gunfight" as well as two non-album b-sides "Breakdown" and "Heartburn", and only 1000 copies would be made. It was revealed on the band's official website that EP sold out on the first day of sale, and despite being released four weeks after the tour had ended the EP still picked up radio play and reached number 2 in the BBC Radio 1 Rock charts.

=== Knight of the Living Dead EP and Silver Spoons & Broken Bones album ===
The band appeared live again during March 2008 when they played two dates in London and Brighton as main support to Velvet Revolver and it was also around this time that it was announced that PIAS would be releasing the band's debut album Silver Spoons & Broken Bones on 7 July 2008. This would be preceded by the single "Knight of the Living Dead" on 23 June and a UK tour, which included appearances at the Download Festival and the Isle of Wight festival, would take place throughout June.

Before all this activity started, the band released a sampler for the album. 3 songs were made available exclusively on iTunes on 25 May 2008. The songs were "Knight of the Living Dead", "Making it Hard" and "Defend Or Die".

Silver Spoons & Broken Bones was released to great acclaim on 7 July. Classic Rock magazine called it "One of the finest rock debuts of the millenium [sic] so far" while Metal Hammer said the album was 'a text book example of something marvellous emerging from shitty adversity'. Kerrang magazine thought it was 'a distillation of most of the things that have historically underpinned great rock music' and even UK tabloid The Sun give it four and a half out of five, adding that "it's a record that oozes joy from every riff, from a band that live and breathe rock 'n' roll". Classic Rock magazine also nominated the band in the Best New Band and Best Album categories at their awards ceremony in November 2008. Despite the critical acclaim, the record experienced limited commercial success, reaching UK #67 in the UK album charts.

=== Knight of the Living Dead tour and more cancellations ===
On 10 June 2008, Stone Gods were scheduled to start their Knight of the Living Dead tour. However, a statement appeared on the band's website on 9 June explaining that the first three dates (Liverpool, Cardiff and Bristol) had been cancelled due to 'an emergency health issue' with drummer Ed Graham. This issue was not specified at the time (it was later reported in SPIN magazine that he had departed the band due to the blood disorder osteonecrosis) and when the tour commenced on 13 June at the Download Festival it was with ex-Bush drummer Robin Goodridge behind the kit. The tour continued successfully and ended with a sold out date at Norwich Waterfront on 29 June 2008. The continuing problems with Ed Graham's health meant that Robin Goodridge appeared with the band again at a performance at the Classic Rock nominations ceremony on 23 July and forced the cancellation of the band's appearance at the Wacken Festival. As expected, it was eventually announced on 29 July that Ed Graham had left the band permanently, and that Robin Goodridge would fill in temporarily.

=== Drummer replaced and more tours ===
Stone Gods performed a one off special gig for Kerrang Radio on 13 September 2008. With Robin Goodridge unavailable, Stuart Cable (formerly of Stereophonics) filled in as temporary drummer. The band also announced a major UK tour as support to Australian rock band Airbourne that took place during November 2008. Before that, on 6 October 2008, it was confirmed by the band that Robin Goodridge of the band Bush was to become the permanent replacement for Ed Graham. This now leaves Dan Hawkins and Richie Edwards as the only two members who used to be with The Darkness and with Dan as the only founding member of the defunct band. The band released a new single "Don't Drink The Water" in late October 2008, containing 3 songs; Don't Drink The Water, and two live recordings of Making It Hard, and Knight of the Living Dead . While on tour with Airbourne on Friday 28 November at the London Astoria, Dan Hawkins joined Airbourne on stage to play the AC/DC classic Whole Lotta Rosie (while Richie looked on from the side of the Stage). Hawkins played Joel O'Keeffe's guitar (white Gibson Explorer) while Joel sung without playing guitar. The band finished the year by joining Black Stone Cherry's tour of the UK when original support band The Answer pulled out. The band have since completed a short UK headlining tour during March 2009, which found many of the dates completely sold out, and have released a third EP titled "Start of Something". This contained four songs; the album track "Start of Something", along with 3 acoustic recordings ("Don't Drink The Water", "Where You Comin' From" and a new, previously unheard song, "Things Could Be Worse").

=== Second album and future activities ===
After a well received performance at the Download Festival in June 2009 the band announced that they would spend most of the rest of the year writing, rehearsing and recording songs for their second album. On 10 August 2009, the band confirmed on their official site that they had been working on a second album, saying "That's right, people, album 2 is coming along leaps and bounds". On 25 August 2009, Richie was quoted on the band's official forum as saying, "New album over halfway there and fingers crossed for a Christmas release with a tour to follow early in 2010!".

On 2 October, Toby MacFarlaine posted a message to fans on the bands forum saying, "Ok, so you want an exclusive?? To MY ears, this record sounds like a perfect and almost biblical mixture of Megadeth, Alice in Chains and The Beatles. My other bandmates may have a different take on it. But, for me, if you don't like any of those three bands then you need to get Spotifying (and then purchasing!!) immediately. Oooohhhhh my gutnisss, are you kids in for a fucken TREAT! xx".

On 21 June 2010, it was announced that drummer Robin Goodridge's former band Bush were reforming. It has been reported that Goodridge and frontman, Gavin Rossdale, are the only members from the original line-up to return to the band.

In a public appearance Dan Hawkins revealed he had been rehearsing with The Darkness, and that 2011 will see The Darkness reform and tour.

On 9 December 2010 Toby Macfarlaine announced on his Twitter that Stone Gods are on hiatus.

On 15 March 2011 The Darkness announced that they would reform. The day after Toby MacFarlaine posted on Stone God's official forum, "Lack of malice. Traces to follow. Love all of y'all. Let's do it again some time. xxT"

Regarding the status of the band, and the unreleased second album, former drummer Ed Graham noted in 2012, "I know they made a second album which Dan was hoping to release at some point. Obviously if you make something you want people to hear it, you know? So I hope he manages to get it released somehow. I don't think we'll ever be reforming but there is a second album that is out there so maybe that will come out."

During an appearance at The Guitar Show in Birmingham on 24 February 2018, Dan Hawkins mentioned that the second Stone Gods album might be released during 2018.

In April 2021, an official Stone Gods Instagram account was opened that Richie and Toby both follow. This has sparked the possibility of a reunion or the release of the band's long awaited second album.

At a fan Q&A in October 2023, Dan was asked if a second Stone Gods album was going to be released - he responded "Yes".

== Band members ==
- Richie Edwards – lead vocals, rhythm guitar (2006–2010)
- Dan Hawkins – lead guitar, piano, backing vocals (2006–2010)
- Toby MacFarlaine – bass, backing vocals (2006–2010)
- Ed Graham – drums, percussion (2006–2008)
- Robin Goodridge – drums, percussion (2008–2010)

== Discography ==
=== Studio albums ===
Year	Title	UK Albums Chart
2008	Silver Spoons & Broken Bones	67

=== EPs ===
Year	Title
2008	Burn the Witch

=== Singles ===
Year	Title	UK Rock Chart	UK Indie Chart	Album
2008	"Burn the Witch"	2	6	Burn the Witch
2008	"Knight of the Living Dead"	-	-	Silver Spoons & Broken Bones
2008	"Don't Drink the Water"	2	10	Silver Spoons & Broken Bones
2009	"Start of Something"	-	-	Silver Spoons & Broken Bones
