= Hot Leg =

2007–2010 English glam metal band

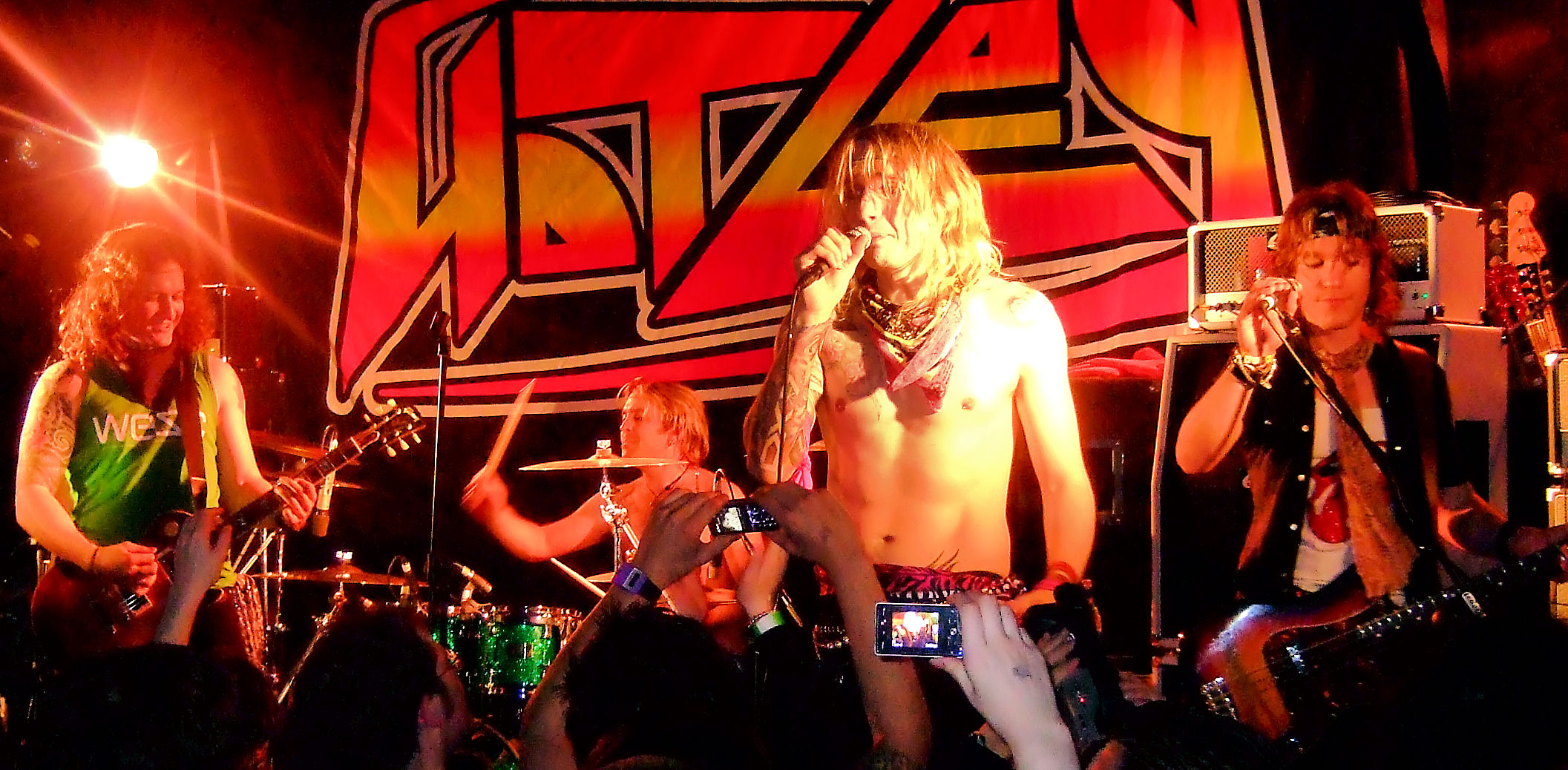
- Hot Leg, Dundee 2008

Background information
- Origin: Lowestoft, Suffolk, England
- Genres: Glam metal, rock
- Years active: 2007–2010
- Label: Barbecue Rock Records
- Spinoff of: The Darkness; British Whale
- Past members: Justin Hawkins; Pete Rinaldi; Samuel SJ Stokes; Darby Todd

Hot Leg were an English rock band led by The Darkness frontman Justin Hawkins. The band consisted of Hawkins, Pete Rinaldi (of Anchorhead), Samuel SJ Stokes (formerly of The Thieves) and Darby Todd (from Protect the Beat). Their debut album Red Light Fever was recorded in London in early 2008 and was released on 9 February 2009 by Barbecue Rock Records.

== Career ==
In November, Hot Leg toured the UK in support of Alter Bridge but pulled out of three dates giving Hawkins's throat infection as the reason. Hot Leg also toured in November with Extreme. Hawkins and Rinaldi guested with Extreme on the final date in London, singing a medley of Queen songs. Hot Leg made a guest appearance on the Sky One programme, Guinness World Records Smashed, which aired on 27 November 2008.

In late 2010, it was announced that Hot Leg were on hiatus, along with Stone Gods, which led to rumours of a possible The Darkness reunion in 2011. This was confirmed on 15 March by an announcement on a new The Darkness website.

== Discography ==
All chart positions are based on UK entries.

=== Albums ===
Year	Album details	UK Albums Chart
2009	Red Light Fever: Released: 9 February 2009; Label: Barbecue Rock Records	81

=== Singles ===
Release date	Song	Album	UK Singles Chart
20 October 2008	"Trojan Guitar"	Red Light Fever	-
15 December 2008	"I've Met Jesus"	Red Light Fever	135
2 March 2009	"Cocktails"	Red Light Fever	-
