= Girlfriend (The Darkness song) =

2006 single by the Darkness

Single by The Darkness

from the album One Way Ticket to Hell... And Back
- B-side: "Girlfriend" (Richie Edwards Mix)
- Released: 22 May 2006
- Length: 2:33
- Label: Atlantic
- Songwriters: Justin Hawkins, Dan Hawkins
- Producer: Roy Thomas Baker

The Darkness singles chronology
"Is It Just Me?" (2006)	"Girlfriend" (2006)	"Nothing's Gonna Stop Us" (2012)

"Girlfriend" is a song by British rock band The Darkness, released as the third and final single from their second studio album, One Way Ticket to Hell... And Back. Released on 22 May 2006, it was the band's last single before their five-year disbandment later that year. The song is written from the perspective of a man who has cheated on his girlfriend with another woman. He tells his now angry girlfriend in the first verse that the other girl meant nothing to him. In the second verse he admits that the relationship is over and his once girlfriend is now his ex. The music video for the song is inspired by the film Flashdance. The song charted at number 39 on the UK Singles Chart. This was the band's lowest charting single since 2003 single "Get Your Hands off My Woman".

== Track listings ==
- CD single
1. "Girlfriend" - 2:33
2. "Girlfriend" (Richie Edwards Mix) - 5:32
- DVD single
1. "Girlfriend" (Music Video) - 2:48
2. "Girlfriend" (Making of the Video) - 2:00
3. "Girlfriend" (Audio) - 2:33
4. "Girlfriend" (British Whale Mix) - 5:45
5. "Girlfriend" (Space Cowboy House Mix) - 5:37
- 10" vinyl
1. "Girlfriend" - 2:33
2. "Girlfriend" (Space Cowboy Hard & Fast Mix) - 5:26
3. "Girlfriend" (Freelance Hellraiser 'Screaming' J Hawkins Mix) - 3:14
- Digital download
1. "Girlfriend" - 2:33
- Digital single
1. "Girlfriend" - 2:33
2. "Girlfriend" (Richie Edwards Mix) - 5:32
- Digital Remixes EP
1. "Girlfriend" (Richie Edwards Mix) - 5:32
2. "Girlfriend" (Freelance Hellraiser 'Screaming' J Hawkins Mix) - 3:14
3. "Girlfriend" (British Whale Mix) - 5:45
4. "Girlfriend" (Space Cowboy Hard & Fast Mix) - 5:26
5. "Girlfriend" (Space Cowboy House Mix) - 5:37

== Chart positions ==
Chart (2006)	Peak position
Irish Singles Chart	40
UK Singles Chart	39
