= Robin Goodridge =

British drummer

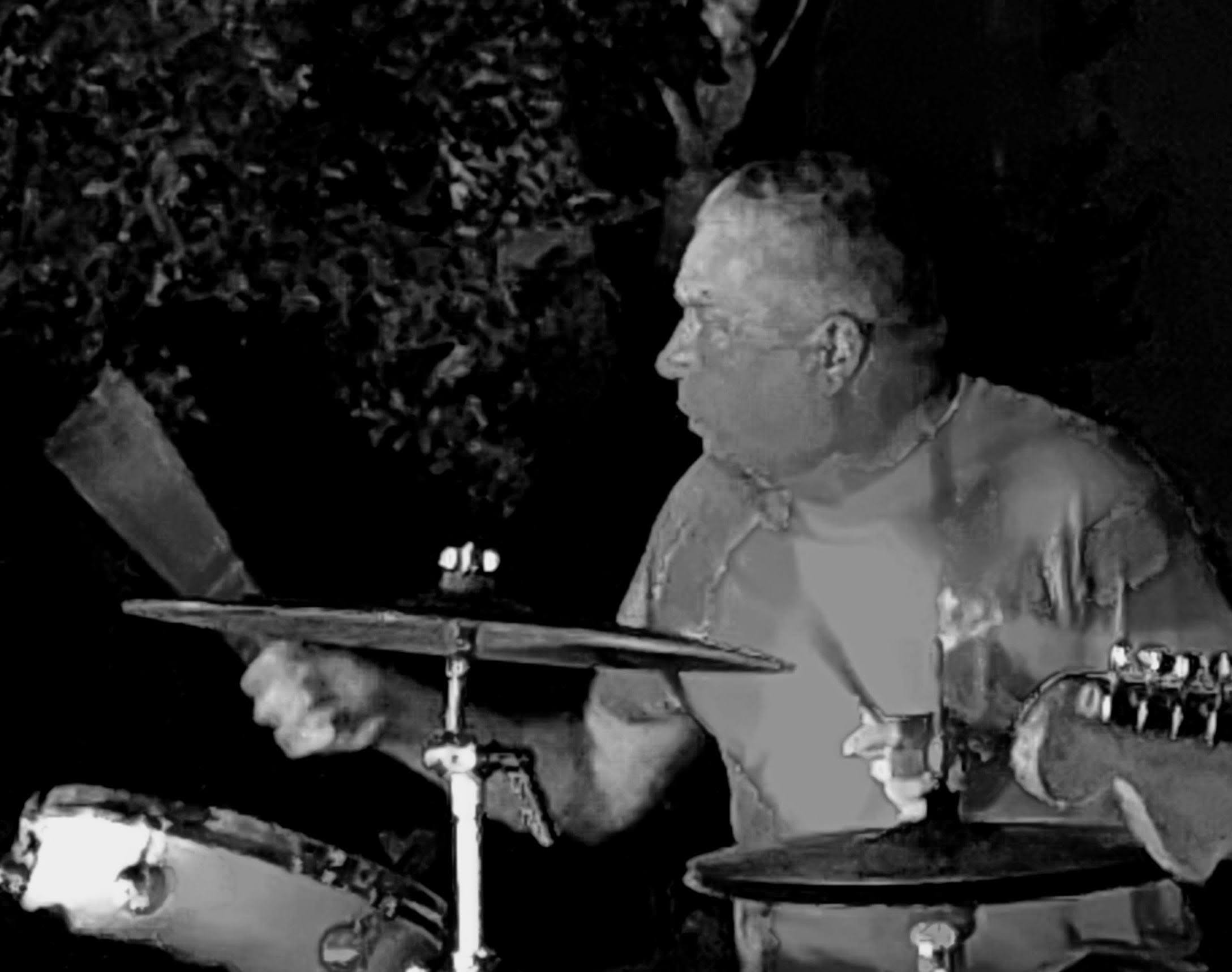
- Robin Goodridge 2025

Background information
- Born: Robin James Goodridge; Crawley, Sussex, England
- Genres: hard rock; alternative rock; grunge; post-grunge
- Occupation: Drummer
- Instrument: Drums
- Years active: 1981–present
- Member of: EMF
- Formerly of: Bush; Spear of Destiny (band); Stone Gods

Robin Goodridge is a British rock drummer. He was a member of rock band Bush, with whom he recorded several platinum and multi-platinum albums. Over the course of his career, his work has been recognized with a Grammy nomination and awards from the American Music Awards and MTV Video Music Awards.

== Early life ==
Goodridge is from Crawley, West Sussex, England.

== Career ==
In his early career, Goodridge performed with the Desperate Dan Band alongside Robert C. "Bob" Brookes.

He was also credited on Dangerous's 1990 album Diamonds And Dollars and on Beautiful People's 1992 album If 60's Were 90's, which charted in 1993. He played with Soul Family Sensation until 1992, recording two tracks on their second album with producer Mike Hedges.

In 1992, Goodridge joined the alternative rock band Bush.

He spent the majority of his career as a member of the band. Bush's discography during this time includes several studio albums, with three achieving platinum or multi-platinum status. The band disbanded in 2002 but later reunited.

During Bush's hiatus from 2002 to 2010, Goodridge worked with the band Elyss from 2004 to 2006. He then joined Kirk Brandon's Spear of Destiny from 2006 to 2008, appearing on their 2007 album, Imperial Prototype.

In June 2008, Goodridge left Spear of Destiny to join The Stone Gods as a touring and session drummer. He performed with them at the Download Festival and recorded for their second album, which was never officially released.

In 2009, he rejoined Spear of Destiny for the 25th Anniversary UK Tour.

Goodridge rejoined Bush for their 2010 reunion.

As one of two founding members in the new Bush lineup, he contributed to two additional albums and toured with the band for nine years. In 2019, Goodridge was dismissed from the band. He filed a lawsuit, which was later settled. Following his departure, Goodridge pursued other projects.

After his second departure from Bush, Goodridge toured again with Spear of Destiny supporting their 40-year anniversary tour. He is also featured on their 2009 compilation album, the Singles Live Tour.

In April 2026, he became the drummer of EMF.

== Playing style ==
Goodridge's drumming style is characterized by its straightforwardness, creating a strong rhythmic foundation for the music. His deliberate approach avoids excessive embellishments to produce a clear, direct sound. One technique he uses involves shifting the backbeat while keeping the kick drum pattern unchanged, a subtle method that adds rhythmic complexity. His preferred drum sound has been described as "fat," and he may also opt for a "Bonham kit sound" on specific tracks. His forceful hitting style requires considerable physicality, and he maintains a pre-performance warm-up routine and wraps his wrists for support.

== Notable performances ==
While with Bush, Goodridge performed at Woodstock '99, where the audience exceeded 180,000 people. The band's performance on July 23 closed the first night of the festival after an opening by Korn. Footage of this performance appears in the 2022 Netflix documentary Trainwreck: Woodstock '99.

Goodridge with Bush also performed at Madison Square Garden in New York (April 14, 1997), Radio City Music Hall (September 4, 1996) for the 1996 MTV Video Music Awards, the CBGB in New York's East Village, and Wembley Stadium in London (October 9, 1999).

== Accolades ==
While Goodridge was with Bush, the band's work earned a 1998 Grammy Award nomination from the National Academy of Recording Arts & Sciences.

They won a 1996 MTV Video Music Award and the award for Favorite Alternative Group at the 1998 American Music Awards.

Bush also received an additional AMA nomination and three more MTV nominations between 1996 and 1998.

During Goodridge's time with Bush, they recorded seven studio albums. The 1994 album Sixteen Stone went six-times platinum, and the 1996 album Razorblade Suitcase went three-times platinum.

Their 1999 album The Science of Things, achieved platinum status and charted in eleven countries. They received a gold certification in 1998 for Deconstructed.

== Critical reception ==
Goodridge has been named in several reviews. Excerpts from Los Angeles Times reviews:

- "Of course, Rossdale and his bandmates--guitarist Nigel Pulsford, bassist Dave Parsons and drummer Robin Goodridge--may not be inclined to take the critics too seriously these days, given the hearty encouragement they’ve received from the public during the past year. -Elysa Gardner"
- "What was most impressive was the way Rossdale and his mates (bassist Dave Parsons, guitarist Nigel Pulsford and drummer Robin Goodridge) have made the move up from clubs to arenas. Rather than be swallowed up by the high expectations and sheer size of the larger setting, Bush appears to have blossomed." -Robert Hilburn
- "Without Parsons, Pulsford or Goodridge, Rossdale would be just a guy with a guitar." -Michelle Foote
- "It was an astonishingly affectionate display from the audience, considering the band hit one musical and emotional note all night, and it underscored how well Bush has worked its formula." "...drummer Robin Goodridge capably delivered Bush’s driving minor chords and low percussive rumble as they mined the group’s two albums." -Natalie Nichols
