= One Way Ticket to Hell... and Back =

One Way Ticket to Hell ...and Back

Studio album by The Darkness
- Released: 28 November 2005
- Recorded: 2005
- Genres: Hard rock, glam rock
- Length: 35:04
- Label: Atlantic
- Producer: Roy Thomas Baker

The Darkness chronology
Permission to Land (2003)	One Way Ticket to Hell ...and Back (2005)	Hot Cakes (2012)

Singles from One Way Ticket to Hell ...and Back
- 1. "One Way Ticket" Released: 14 November 2005; 2. "Hazel Eyes" Released: 28 November 2005; 3. "Is It Just Me?" Released: 13 February 2006; 4. "Girlfriend" Released: 22 May 2006

Professional ratings
Aggregate scores
Source	Rating
Metacritic	68/100
Review scores
Source	Rating
AllMusic	3/5 stars
Alternative Press	5/5 stars
Entertainment Weekly	D+
The Guardian	4/5 stars
The Observer	3/5 stars
Pitchfork	6.5/10
PopMatters	8/10
Q	4/5 stars
Rolling Stone	3/5 stars
Spin	A−

One Way Ticket to Hell... and Back is the second studio album by the British rock band the Darkness. It was released on 28 November 2005 through Atlantic Records, reaching number 11 on the UK Album Chart and eventually attaining platinum status in the UK. Three singles were released from the album. The lead single, "One Way Ticket", reached number 8 on the UK Singles Chart, as did the second single "Is It Just Me?"

== Background ==
The album was produced by Roy Thomas Baker, best known for his work with Queen, a major influence on the Darkness. Bassist Frankie Poullain left the band part way through the recording of the album, with bass guitars on the album played by Dan Hawkins. Poullain said that "Hazel Eyes" is his favourite track on the record, saying, "I defy anyone after a couple of beverages to listen to 'Hazel Eyes' standing up and NOT get the Michael Flatleys." Poullain was already familiar with six of the ten songs on the album, having played "Hazel Eyes", "Dinner Lady Arms", "Seemed Like a Good Idea at the Time" and "English Country Garden" on tour with the band before his departure. He also co-wrote four of the tracks featured on the album. The working title for the album was The Painstaking.

In November 2025, the band released a 20th anniversary deluxe edition of the album, contaning a remaster of the album, along with three bonus discs containing b-sides, demos, and live recordings.

== Track listing ==
All tracks are written by Justin Hawkins and Dan Hawkins except where noted.

No.	Title	Writer(s)	Length
1.	"One Way Ticket"	J. Hawkins, D. Hawkins, Frankie Poullain	4:26
2.	"Knockers"	J. Hawkins, D. Hawkins, Poullain	2:43
3.	"Is It Just Me?"	J. Hawkins, D. Hawkins, Poullain	3:05
4.	"Dinner Lady Arms"		3:16
5.	"Seemed Like a Good Idea at the Time"	J. Hawkins, D. Hawkins, Poullain	3:34
6.	"Hazel Eyes"		3:25
7.	"Bald"	J. Hawkins, D. Hawkins, Ed Graham	5:31
8.	"Girlfriend"		2:33
9.	"English Country Garden"		3:06
10.	"Blind Man"		3:25
Total length:			35:04

== Other tracks ==
- "Wanker" (B-side to One Way Ticket) (J. Hawkins/D. Hawkins) – 3:07
- "Grief Hammer" (B-side to One Way Ticket) (J. Hawkins/D. Hawkins) – 3:12
- "Shake (Like a Lettuce Leaf)" (B-side to Is It Just Me?) (J. Hawkins/D. Hawkins) – 3:18
- "Shit Ghost" (B-side to Is It Just Me?) (J. Hawkins/D. Hawkins) – 3:10

== Reception ==
Reviews for the album were mixed. Q magazine proclaimed it the 22nd best album of 2005. However Planet Sound remarked how it was the "world's most expensive penis joke", regarding the costly delay of the album, and hyper-masculine themes throughout. In an interview with The Sun, Dan said that it cost £1 million to make.

== Personnel ==
- Justin Hawkins – vocals, lead guitars, sitar, piano, Hammond organ, Mini-moog, synths
- Dan Hawkins – guitars, bass, tubular bells, marching drums, tambourine, triangle, backing vocals
- Ed Graham – drums
- Richie Edwards – bass, backing vocals

=== Additional musicians ===
- Freddy Gomez – pan flute on "One Way Ticket"
- Stuart Cassells – bagpipes on "Hazel Eyes"

== Charts ==
Chart performance for One Way Ticket to Hell... and Back
Chart (2005–2006)	Peak position
Australian Albums (ARIA)	25
Austrian Albums (Ö3 Austria)	44
Belgian Albums (Ultratop Flanders)	83
Canadian Albums (Billboard)	43
Dutch Albums (Album Top 100)	85
Finnish Albums (Suomen virallinen lista)	31
French Albums (SNEP)	132
German Albums (Offizielle Top 100)	32
Irish Albums (IRMA)	20
Italian Albums (FIMI)	27
New Zealand Albums (RMNZ)	25
Norwegian Albums (VG-lista)	29
Spanish Albums (Promusicae)	76
Swedish Albums (Sverigetopplistan)	22
Swiss Albums (Schweizer Hitparade)	48
UK Albums (Official Charts)	11
US Billboard 200	58

Chart performance for One Way Ticket to Hell... and Back
Chart (2025)	Peak position
Hungarian Physical Albums (MAHASZ)	21

== Certifications ==
Region	Certification	Certified units/sales
Australia (ARIA)	Gold	35,000^{^}
United Kingdom (BPI)	Gold	100,000^{^}
^{^} Shipments figures based on certification alone.
