= Red Light Fever (Hot Leg album) =

Studio album by Hot Leg
- Released: 9 February 2009
- Recorded: August 2008 – December 2008
- Genre: Glam metal, hard rock, glam rock
- Length: 34:28
- Label: Barbecue Rock Records
- Producer: Stephen Marcussen, Justin Hawkins

Singles from Red Light Fever
- 1. "Trojan Guitar" Released: 20 October 2008; 2. "I've Met Jesus" Released: 15 December 2008; 3. "Cocktails" Released: 2 March 2009

Professional ratings
Review scores
Source	Rating
The Daily Telegraph	not rated link
The Independent	link
Kerrang!	3/5 stars
NME	link
Rockmidgets.com	link

Red Light Fever is the debut and only studio album released by musical group Hot Leg, led by singer-songwriter Justin Hawkins, of The Darkness. The album was released in Europe on 9 February 2009 and in the United States on 17 February 2009.

== Background ==
Writing of Red Light Fever began when lead vocalist Justin Hawkins left The Darkness. Several demos were leaked onto the internet mid-2007, leading many people to believe he was releasing a solo album; however, in August 2008 it was announced that Hawkins had formed a new band. In January 2009, it was announced via the band's MySpace page that the debut album would be released in Europe on 9 February.

Songs featured on the album include, "Whichever Way You Want to Give It", "You Can't Hurt Me Anymore", "Gay in the 80s", the download-only single "Trojan Guitar" and Christmas 'super-smash' "I've Met Jesus". Promotional song "Heroes" was not included on the album. Other songs on the album include; "Chickens", "Prima Donna" and "Cocktails", their first major single release.

Every track on the record was scored, performed and recorded by Hawkins. The album was mastered by Stephen Marcussen at Marcussen Mastering. Chas Bayfield, formerly of E-Wing, Team Pig and The International Christian Playboys, co-wrote lyrics to the tracks "Cocktails", "Gay in the 80s" and "I've Met Jesus". Hawkins' Eurovision collaborator Beverlei Brown appears on the track "Ashamed".

== Track listing ==
No.	Title	Writer(s)	Length
1.	"Chickens"	Justin Hawkins	3:16
2.	"You Can't Hurt Me Anymore"	Hawkins	3:19
3.	"Ashamed" (featuring Beverlei Brown)	Hawkins	3:04
4.	"I've Met Jesus"	Hawkins • Chas Bayfield	3:09
5.	"Trojan Guitar"	Hawkins	5:25
6.	"Cocktails"	Hawkins • Bayfield	3:58
7.	"Gay in the '80s"	Hawkins • Bayfield	3:17
8.	"Prima Donna"	Hawkins	3:27
9.	"Whichever Way You Wanna Give It"	Hawkins	3:23
10.	"Kissing in the Wind"	Hawkins	3:30

Red Light Fever — Additional tracks
No.	Title	Writer(s)	Length
11.	"Cupboard Love" (used as a B-side to the "I've Met Jesus" CD single version)	Hawkins	4:26
12.	"Automatic" (used as a B-side to the "I've Met Jesus" download version)	Brock Walsh • Mark Goldenberg	4:02
13.	"All I Gotta Do" (used as a B-side to the "Cocktails" CD single version)	Darcy Clay	3:31
14.	"Do It in the Dark" (used as a B-side to the "Cocktails" download version)	Hawkins	2:08
15.	"Heroes" (available as a free download on the official Hot Leg site for a limited time only)	Hawkins • Bayfield	2:44
16.	"Take Take Take" (available as a free download on the official Hot leg site)	Hawkins	2:32

== Personnel ==
- Justin Hawkins — lead vocals, lead guitar, synthesizer
- Pete Rinaldi – lead guitar, backing vocals
- Samuel SJ Stokes – bass, backing vocals
- Darby Todd – drums
