= Richie Edwards =

English musician (born 1974)

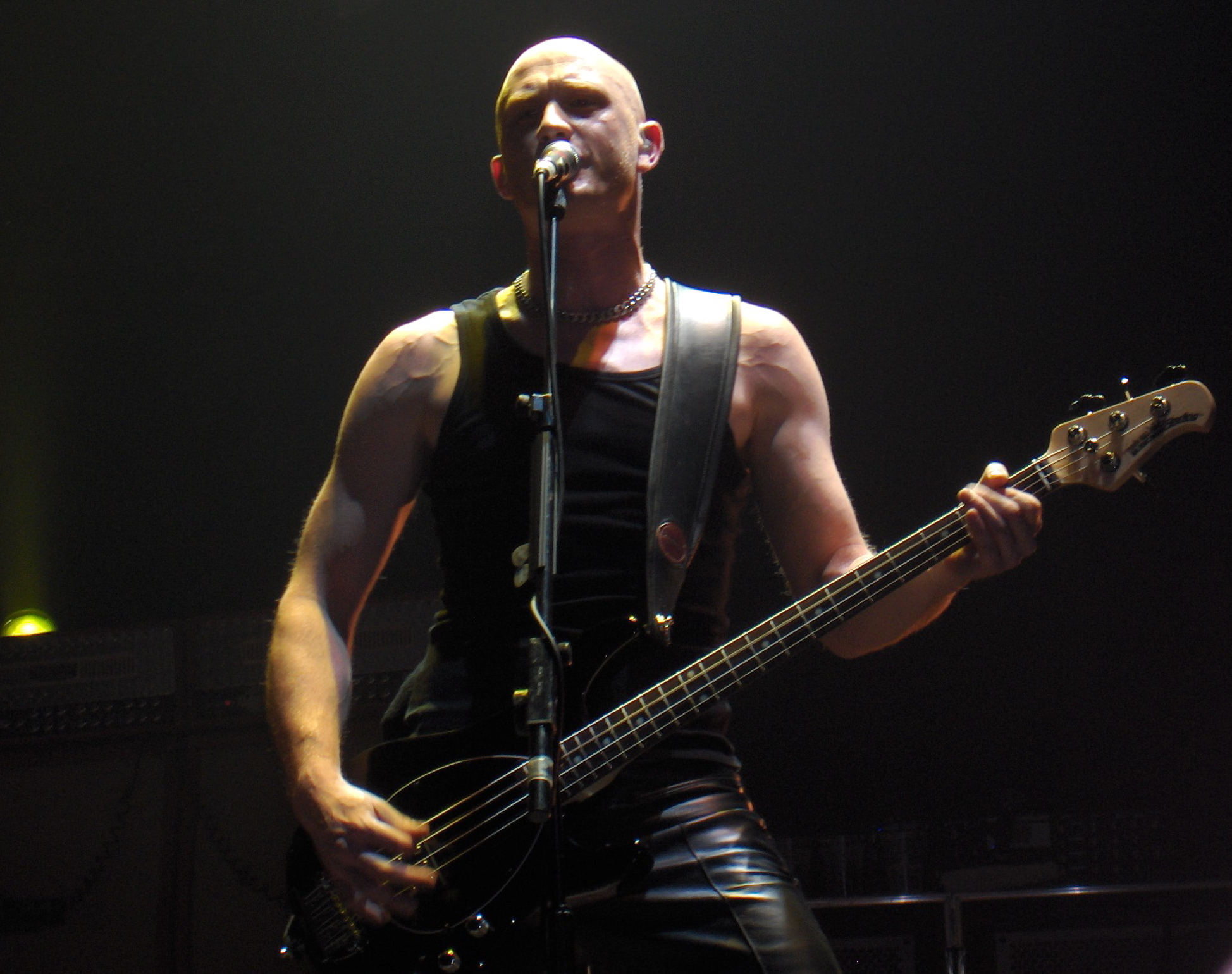

Background information
- Born: 25 September 1974 (age 51)
- Genres: Hard rock, glam metal, heavy metal, glam rock
- Occupations: Musician, singer, songwriter, bassist, guitarist
- Instruments: Vocals, guitar, bass
- Years active: 2005–present
- Labels: Atlantic, Must Destroy
- Website: thedarkness.co.uk

Richie Edwards (born 25 September 1974) is an English musician. He was briefly the bassist of the British hard rock band The Darkness and the guitarist/vocalist of their successor band Stone Gods. He was confirmed as a member on 13 June 2005 replacing Frankie Poullain on bass. When The Darkness disbanded following Justin Hawkins' departure, Edwards switched to lead vocals, with Toby McFarlaine taking over on bass. With original Darkness members Ed Graham and Dan Hawkins completing the new line-up, they recorded under the new name of The Stone Gods.

Edwards grew up in Lichfield, Staffordshire, and was a member of bands at Netherstowe School. Subsequently, on leaving school he was employed in S&J Music, a local music shop on Bird Street and was involved in other local bands, including Gloy, who almost secured a recording deal themselves. This work ultimately led to London and becoming a guitar technician. He is quoted as saying that when he was young his hero was John Deacon, the bass guitarist of Queen.

Before joining The Darkness, Edwards worked for nearly two years as a guitar technician for the band. He was also a member of the band Onion Trump.

== Equipment ==
For playing live with Stone Gods, Edwards uses Gibson Explorer and Gibson Les Paul guitars into a Diezel VH4 Amplifier with Marshall 1960 Vintage Cabinets. For the song "Magdalene St.", he uses a Martin acoustic guitar.
