= Justin Hawkins =

English musician (born 1975)

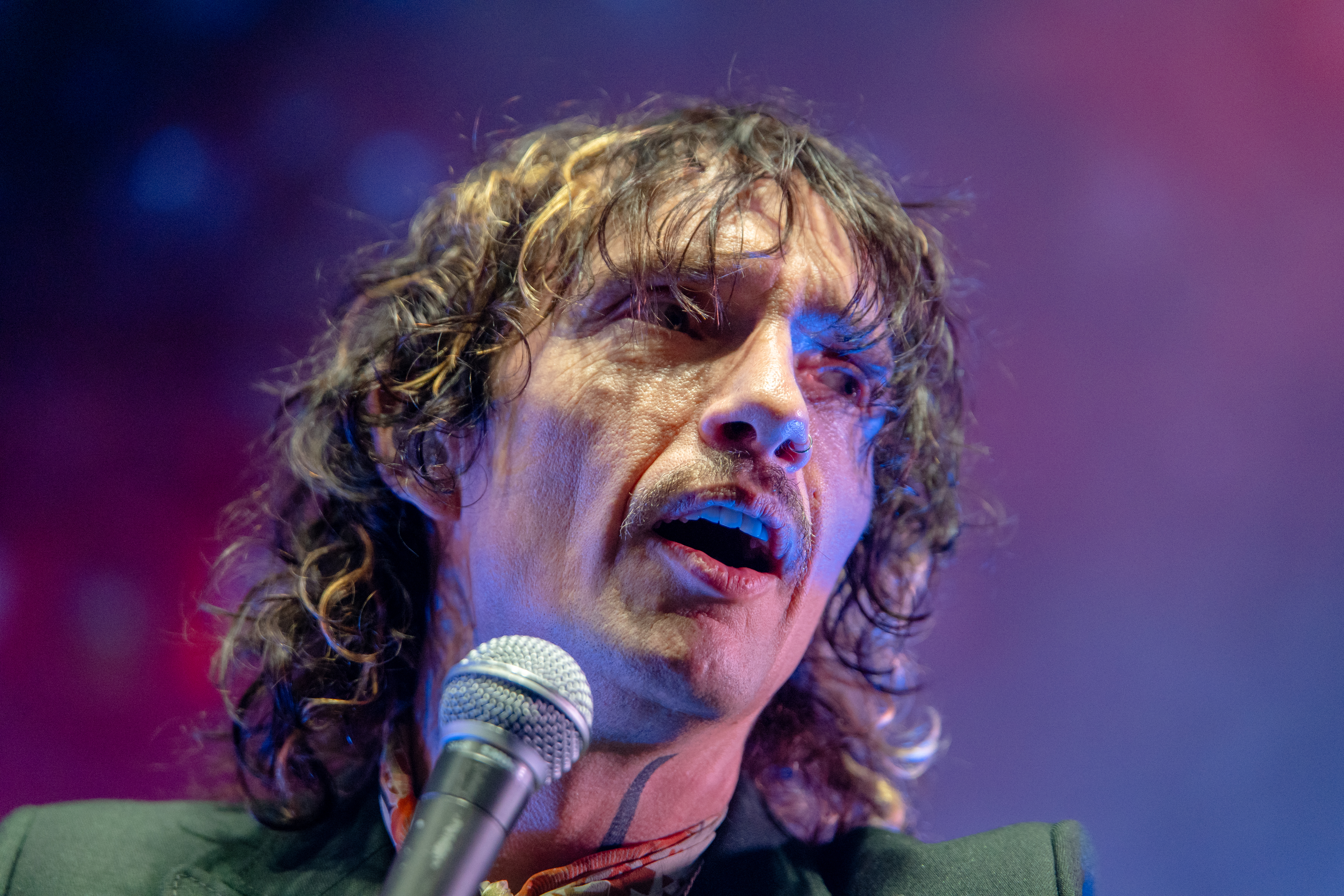
- Hawkins performing live in Oslo, 2025

Background information
- Born: Justin David Hawkins; 17 March 1975 (age 51); Chertsey, Surrey, England
- Genres: Hard rock; glam rock; glam metal; heavy metal
- Occupations: Musician; singer; songwriter; YouTuber; media personality
- Instruments: Vocals; guitar; keyboards; sitar; bass
- Years active: 1992–present
- Labels: Cooking Vinyl; Atlantic; Must Destroy
- Member of: The Darkness
- Formerly of: Hot Leg
- Website: thedarknesslive.com

Justin David Hawkins (born 17 March 1975) is an English musician. He is a co-founder, lead singer, and guitarist of The Darkness, of which his younger brother Dan is also a member. He is also the lead singer and guitarist for the band Hot Leg, formed in 2008 and now on hiatus. In 2021, Hawkins launched a YouTube channel entitled Justin Hawkins Rides Again, where he does comedic analysis on songs or artists in addition to covering news in the musical community. Hawkins has been widely praised for his musical abilities, particularly his voice which spans five octaves.

== Early life ==
Hawkins was born on 17 March 1975 in Chertsey, Surrey to Sandra and Harold Hawkins. His brother Dan Hawkins was born on 12 December 1976. The brothers grew up in Lowestoft, Suffolk; Hawkins recalled that he and Dan shared a friendly sibling rivalry which prompted both brothers to learn to play the guitar at a young age. Hawkins and his brother both attended East Point Academy. He later found interest as a vocalist, citing Freddie Mercury and Bon Scott as his two biggest influences.

== Music career ==
Hawkins was enrolled at Huddersfield Technical College from 1995 until 1997 to study Music Technology. He later managed a position writing advertisement jingles for Ikea and Yahoo! through the late 1990s and early 2000s. Hawkins' brother Dan recalled that Justin had developed a flamboyant stage image as he often performed with numerous local bands wearing spandex or sparkled outfits while utilizing his distinct vocal range to captivate audiences. Hawkins later claimed he used his earnings from a popular commercial he wrote and sang for Ikea in 2000 to fund the Darkness' debut album.

=== The Darkness ===
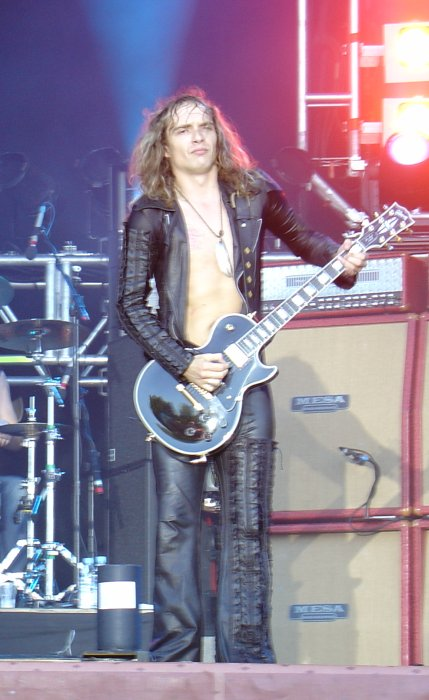
Hawkins performing with The Darkness at Ankkarock, Finland

Hawkins and his brother Dan had performed together in numerous bands whilst they were both attending university; though Justin recalls his brother was the original singer of a progressive rock project the two took part in. Eventually the two met drummer Ed Graham and sought to create a new project., the two began playing clubs and pubs before they were later signed by record label Atlantic Records. Their debut album, Permission to Land, went straight to number two in the UK charts upon its release on 7 July 2003, before going to number one and staying there for four weeks, eventually going on to sell 1.5 million copies in the UK and 3.5 million copies worldwide. The success of this album led to heavy touring for the band, including European portions of Metallica's Summer Sanitarium Tour 2003. They went on to headline the Carling Festival in 2004. The band won three BRIT Awards in 2004 in response to the album, Best Group, Best Rock Group and Best Album. They also won two Kerrang! awards in 2004 for Best Live Act and Best British Band. The third single from the album, "I Believe in a Thing Called Love", was a substantial hit in the UK, as was their tilt at the Christmas 2003 number 1, "Christmas Time (Don't Let the Bells End)", which only just fell short, both singles reaching No. 2 in 2003. The band also appeared in the video for Band Aid 20, with Hawkins singing a number of lines.

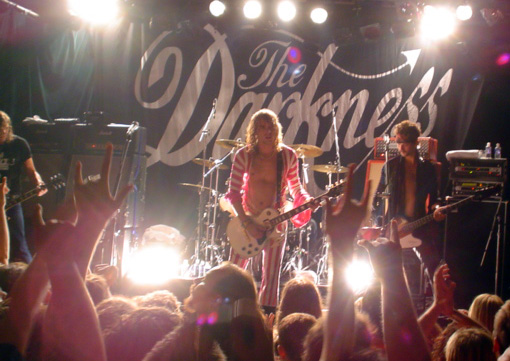
Hawkins performs live with the Darkness

By late 2004 the band's constant media coverage had started to lead to a general public backlash, and Hawkins and the band themselves seemed to show signs that they were disillusioned with their constant media appearances, walking off of an episode of the U.S.-nationally syndicated radio talk show Loveline on 19 April 2004.

In October 2005, a month before the album One Way Ticket to Hell... And Back was to be officially released, Hawkins won an eBay auction for a copy of One Way Ticket to Hell... and Back for £350 under the username 'turbogunhawk'. He claimed he did this so that he could track down whoever sold the digitally-marked advance copy of the album and try to prevent it from happening again.

"One Way Ticket", the first single from their second album, was released on 14 November 2005, debuting and peaking at number 8 on the UK Singles chart. The album itself was released on 28 November 2005, to somewhat mixed reviews. The album was produced by rock producer Roy Thomas Baker, best known for his work with Queen. Early sales figures in the UK showed the album had not sold as well its predecessor, Permission to Land. The album debuted at no. 11, and fell to number 34 in the second week of its release. Although it went on to achieve platinum status, this was in stark contrast with their debut's five times platinum status.

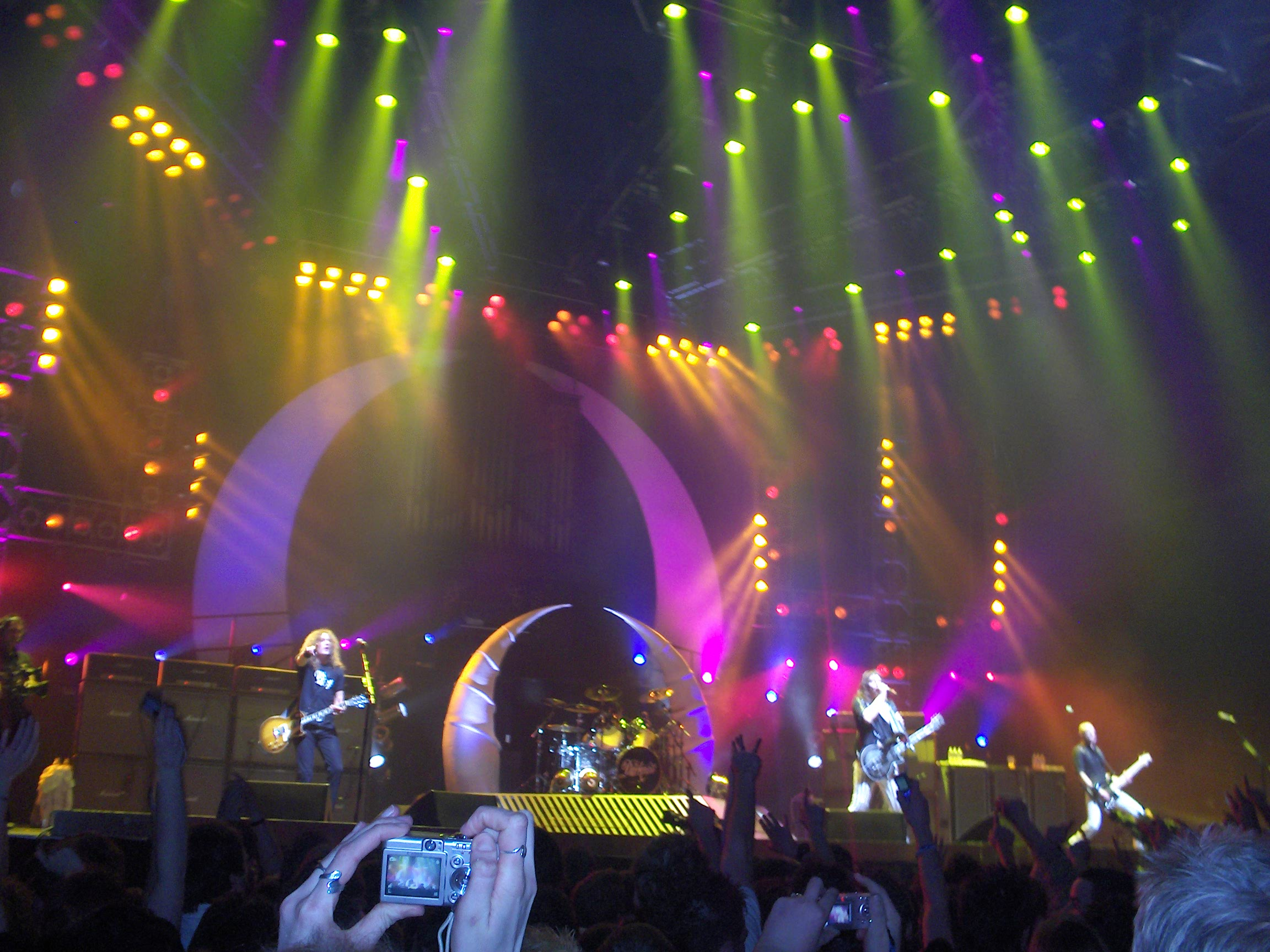
The Darkness live in Glasgow, February 2006

The second single taken from their second album was "Is It Just Me?", released on 20 February 2006. The single gained a preliminary position of No. 6 all that week, but finally charted at number 8. Hawkins announced when on stage that their third single to be released from the album was "Girlfriend". Released 22 May, "Girlfriend" charted at number 39.

The band followed up their second album with a tour of the UK and Ireland, consisting of 12 dates in the major cities. The tour opened in Dublin's Point Depot on 4 February and closed in the Nottingham Arena on 20 February. Few of the venues sold out, their appeal seemingly having become more selective. Their world tour, which followed, arrived in Australia and Japan after touring Scandinavia and Continental Europe in March.

In October 2006, Hawkins left the Darkness. Although drug and alcohol problems were initially cited as the main reason, later on national television, Hawkins would claim that he had grown tired of the constant routine of the band, recording and promoting an album, going on tours for months, back in the studio, etc. which he considered "monotonous and boring" and "could not understand how bands like the Rolling Stones could sustain it". For his time with the Darkness, Hawkins placed at number 35 on Spin's list of the greatest frontmen of all time.

In 2011 the band reunited and toured Europe, Asia and North America throughout 2011 and 2012 in support of their new album Hot Cakes. They then released Last Of Our Kind in 2015.

The band returned in 2017 with Pinewood Smile, their first album to come through Cooking Vinyl. Ahead of the album's announcement, The Darkness toured Europe in support of Guns N' Roses and played a number of festivals in the UK and Europe during the summer. In 2018, they released their Live At Hammersmith album.

2019 saw the Darkness release the album Easter Is Cancelled on 4 October; the album charted in the top 10 in the UK.

In January 2020, The Darkness released a new video for "In Another Life", which featured model Abbey Clancy. The track then made the BBC Radio 2 B-List.

=== Other projects ===
In 2005, Hawkins set up a solo project, called British Whale. His debut single, "This Town Ain't Big Enough for Both of Us", a cover of the 1974 hit by Sparks, was released on 15 August, reached No. 6 on the UK Singles Chart. The music video depicts Hawkins competing in a game show against World Darts Champion Phil Taylor, and features Sparks's Ron and Russell Mael as the show's hosts.

In 2006 Hawkins released a second single, available only to download, an unofficial World Cup anthem called "England".

Hawkins sang backing vocals on the Sweet's song "Hell Raiser" for Def Leppard's 2006 covers album Yeah!

In early 2007, he became half of one of six acts competing to represent the UK in the Eurovision Song Contest competition in Helsinki in a duet with singer Beverlei Brown. He entered Making Your Mind Up with Beverlei Brown singing a song entitled "They Don’t Make 'Em Like They Used To" but did not win the competition.

On 16 March 2007, he appeared on the Comic Relief evening during the half-hour Top Gear of the Pops programme. This saw him performing Billy Ocean's "Red Light Spells Danger" with the three Top Gear presenters.

Later that month, on 29 March, Hawkins created a new Myspace profile featuring songs that were planned to be included on his upcoming solo album entitled Panther. The songs are titled "You Can't Hurt Me Anymore", "I've Met Jesus" and "Whichever". On 12 May, Hawkins added a further song to his profile, "Gay in the 80's". The songs appeared on the Hot Leg album Red Light Fever.

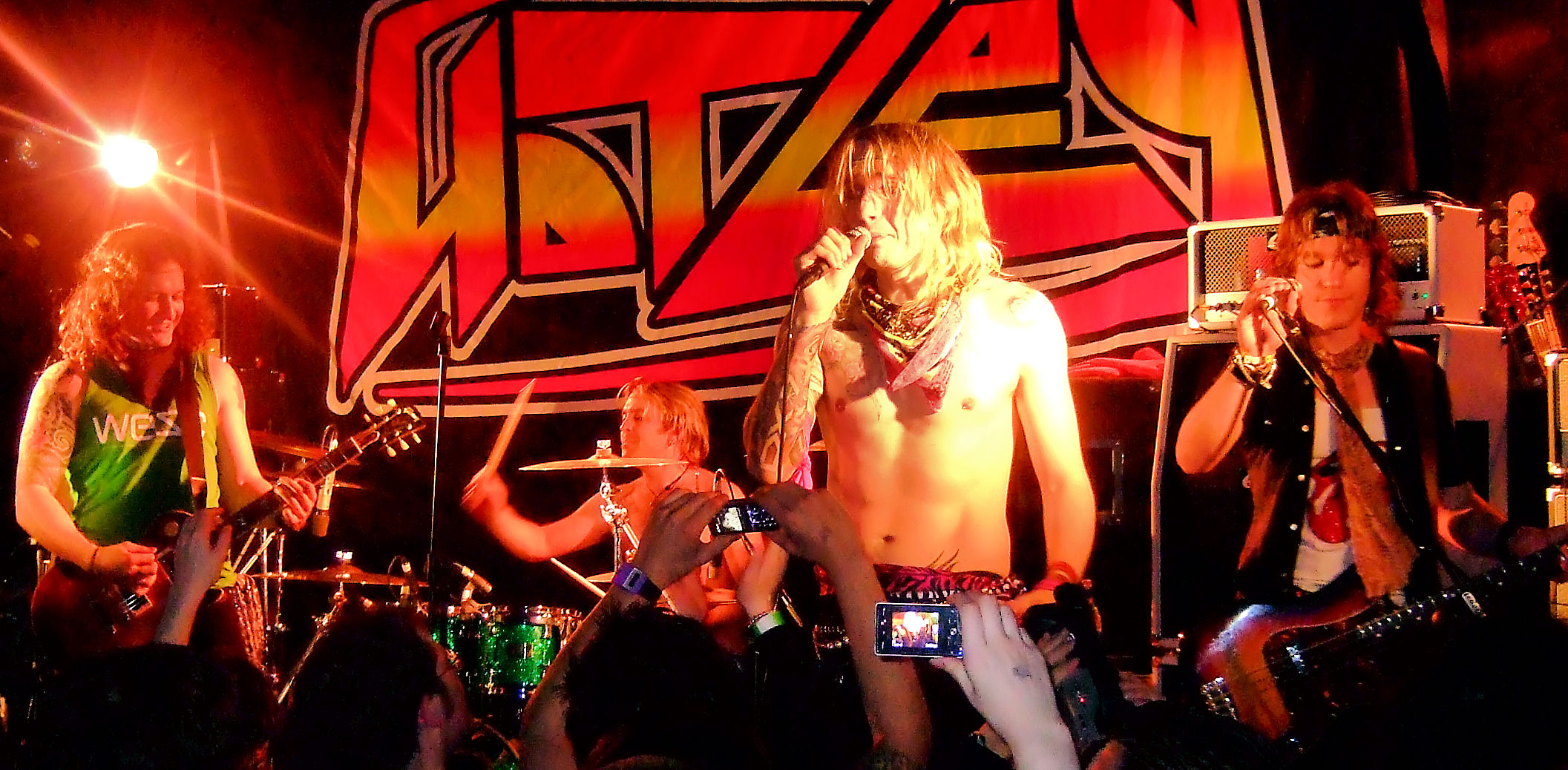
Hawkins with the band Hot Leg, October 2008

There is a wax model of Hawkins at Madame Tussaud's in London.

Hawkins supplied the singing and guitar playing for Kurtz, the lead singer of the "bad guy band" Mantyz in the BBC's animated series Freefonix, which debuted on 4 January 2008.

In the film Telstar about Joe Meek's life and career, released on 19 June 2009, Hawkins played the role of Screaming Lord Sutch.

With Hot Leg in November 2008, he toured the UK supporting Alter Bridge (4–13 November) and Extreme (14–24 November).

Hawkins has also worked with British pop-rock band Saving Aimee, producing their debut album. He also lent his "truth larynx" to the track "Party All Day (Fuck All Night)" guesting on the 2009 Steel Panther release, Feel the Steel. Hawkins recently worked with Adam Lambert on the track "Music Again" off his debut album.

Justin played the role of Josh, a burned out rockstar in the 2010 movie Psychosis. The movie also featured three Hot Leg songs.

Hawkins also appeared on the Meat Loaf album Hang Cool Teddy Bear, where he co-wrote two songs ("Love Is Not Real" and "California Isn't Big Enough"). He also provided guitar on "California Isn't Big Enough" and backing vocals on "Love Is Not Real" and "Los Angeloser".

In 2012, Hawkins appeared in a Samsung commercial for their Galaxy Note smartphone during Super Bowl XLVI. In the same year, Hawkins and brother Dan appeared in the ZingZillas episode Electric Guitar.

In 2016, Hawkins appeared on the De La Soul album and the Anonymous Nobody... providing vocals on the track "Lord Intended".

In 2020, Hawkins participated in the UK version of The Masked Singer, appearing as Chameleon. His identity was revealed in the third episode when he was voted out. During his time on the show he performed renditions of "Creep" by Radiohead, "Feel It Still" by Portugal. The Man, and "True Colors" by Cyndi Lauper.

On 3 September 2022, Hawkins participated in the Taylor Hawkins Tribute Concert at Wembley Stadium, where he joined John Lousteau and the Coattail Riders to perform "Louise", "Range Rover Bitch" and "It's Over". He then joined Wolfgang Van Halen, Dave Grohl and Josh Freese to perform "On Fire" and "Hot for Teacher" by Van Halen. He also made an appearance with Brian Johnson to perform "Back in Black". Later, he performed "Under Pressure" with Queen.

== YouTube career ==
In 2021, Hawkins launched his YouTube channel, "Justin Hawkins Rides Again", where he reviews music, commentates on the music industry and answers fan questions. As of April 2025, Hawkins’ channel has surpassed 600,000 subscribers. Hawkins has received praise from viewers for his comedic delivery and remarkable guitar abilities as he frequently dissects song structures; his videos have amassed nearly 90 million views cumulatively. Hawkins has reviewed numerous songs and artists such as Greta Van Fleet, Maroon 5, Morrissey, My Chemical Romance, Disturbed, Corey Feldman, The Sisters Of Mercy, Metallica, Korn, Limp Bizkit, Deftones and Slipknot among others.

== Personal life ==
Hawkins is a vegan.

Hawkins is a football fan, having supported Manchester United growing up, but he is now primarily a supporter of Norwich City.

== Equipment ==
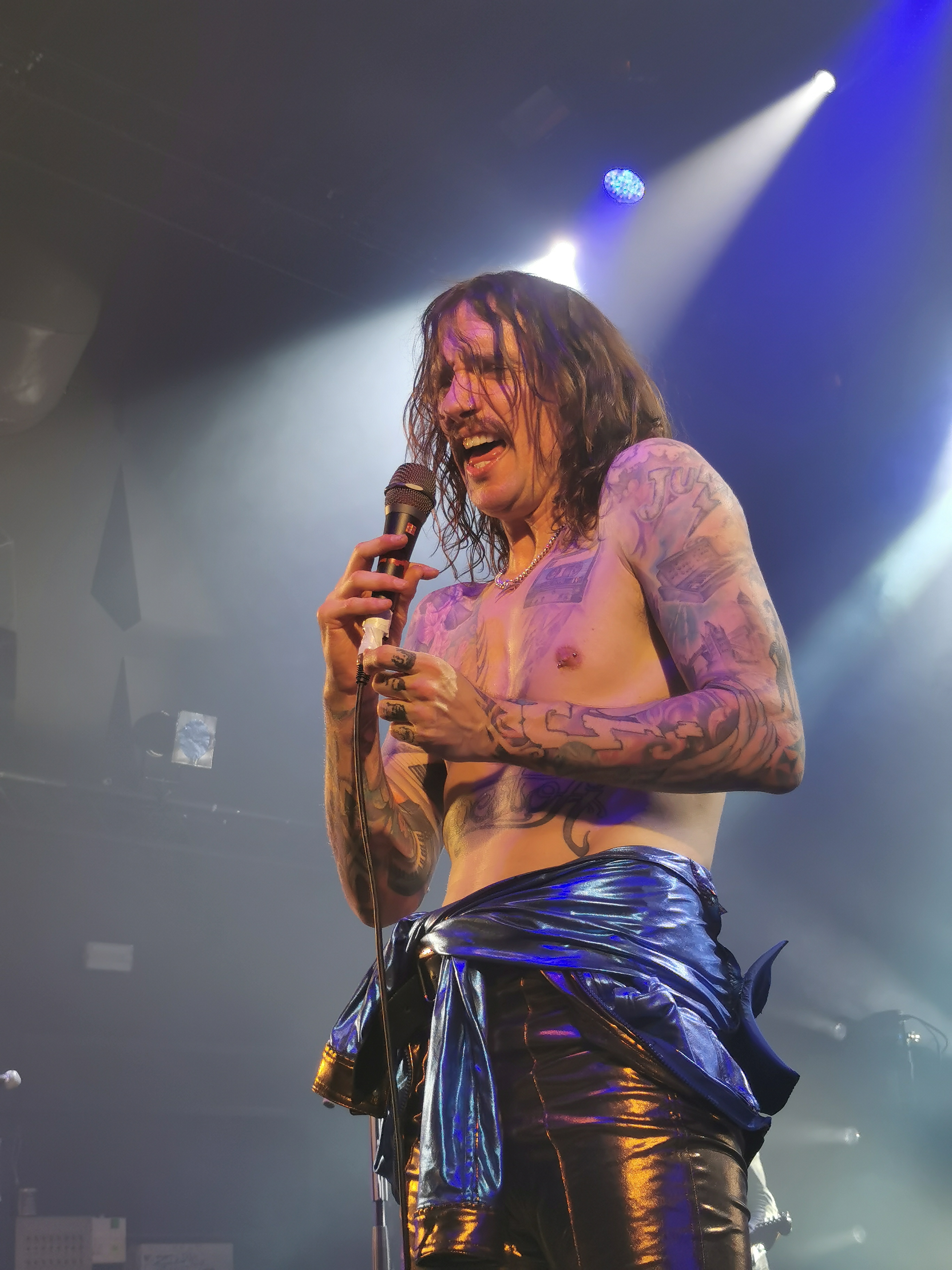
Hawkins in 2020

Hawkins is seen playing Gibson Les Paul Customs almost exclusively. He is most commonly seen playing an alpine white model which he used with the Darkness (as seen in the "I Believe in a Thing Called Love" and "Love Is Only a Feeling" music videos), and with Hot Leg. It is rare to see him use another guitar, although he can be seen playing a custom Ibanez Jem for the song "Bald". He has also been seen using an ebony Gibson Les Paul Custom, a one-off Gibson "Less Paul" custom sculpted to resemble a shell, and a custom finished blue Les Paul standard airbrushed with the mythical dog Black Shuck and Blythburgh church. In 2004 Gibson issued a limited run of Justin Hawkins signature Les Paul Customs based on the '68 RI with abalone and mother of pearl "flame" inlays on the fretboard, a sparkle finish in either Silverburst or Pinkburst (a Blueburst and Redburst have also been pictured, as well as a one-off Gold Mirror finish produced by SimS Custom Guitars). These have become highly valuable because of their scarcity and unique features.

Recently, as seen at the September 5th show at the NorVa in Norfolk, Virginia, Hawkins played most of the show with a white Atkins Mindhorn.

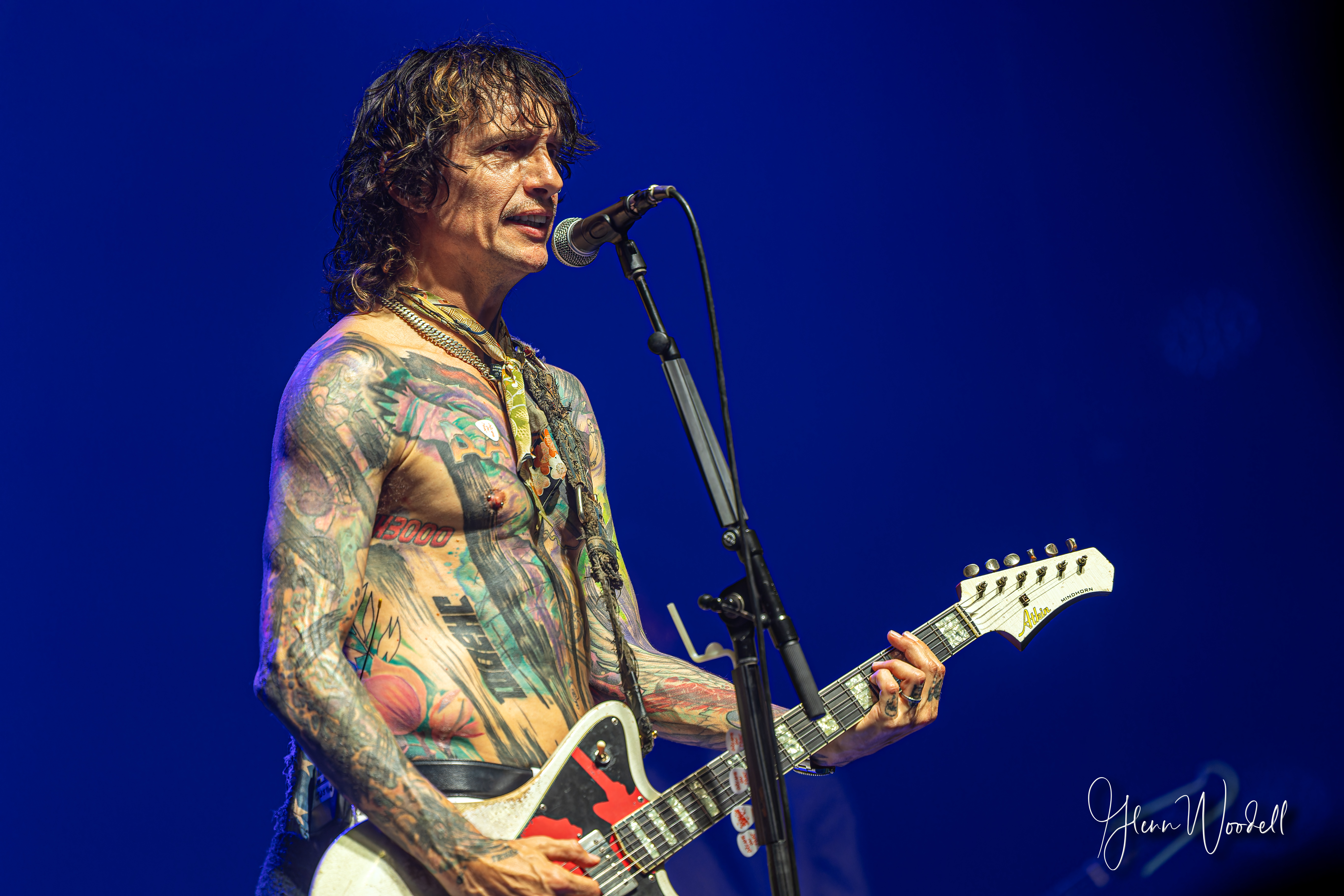
Justin Hawkins with his Atkins Mindhorn guitar

He also used two of his heavily road worn Atkins JH3001 models, with a reversed headstocks, custom made for him, one neon pink and one neon yellow.

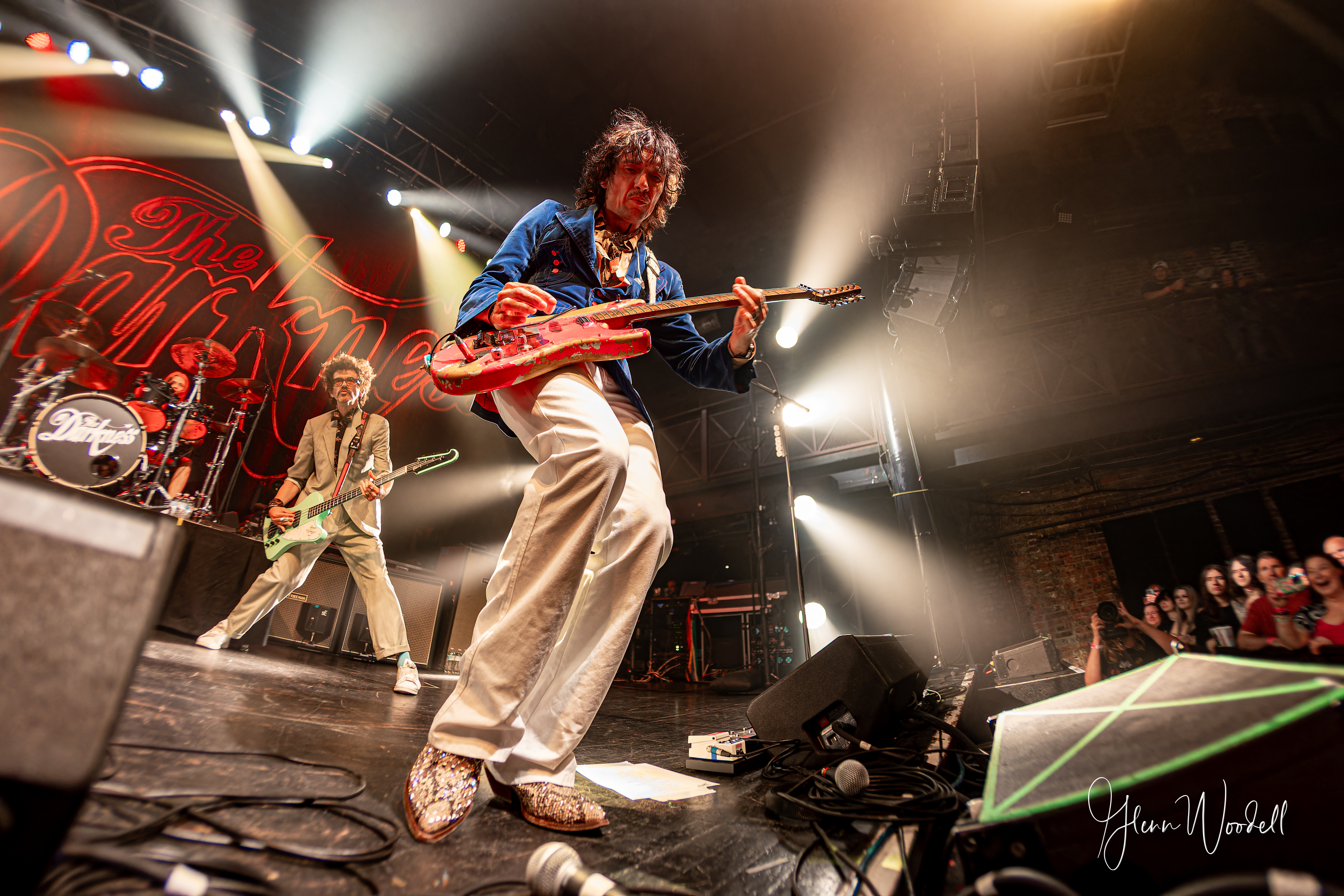
Justin Hawkins with his neon red Atkins JH3001 guitar

Hawkins used Mesa/Boogie Dual and Triple Rectifier amplifiers rather than Marshalls when performing with the Darkness. The stacks he was using had custom-made speaker cabs coated in red leather. During his time in Hot Leg he was exclusively seen using Cornford MK50H II's in white vinyl with two Cornford, 16-ohm, 4x12 cabinets loaded with Celestion "Vintage 30s". Since the Darkness reformation he has been seen using multiple modified Marshall 1959 MKII Plexi Reissue guitar amps with a boosted gain stage run through Marshall 1960B cabinets. Between 2016 and 2021, Hawkins used EVH and Wizard amplifiers. From December 2021, Hawkins has used Laney JH3000 heads and GS 4x12 cabinets.

In a 2012 edition of Guitarist magazine's video series "On the Road with..." Hawkins's pedal setup consisted of a Boss Analog Delay, a Pro Co RAT, a Diamond Pedals Compressor, a Boss TU-3 Tuner, and a Dunlop Cry Baby DCR-2SR rack module which allows him to have three separate wah-wah pedals strategically placed around the stage. As of 2016, Hawkins does not use any pedals.
