= Dan Hawkins (musician) =

British guitarist (born 1976)

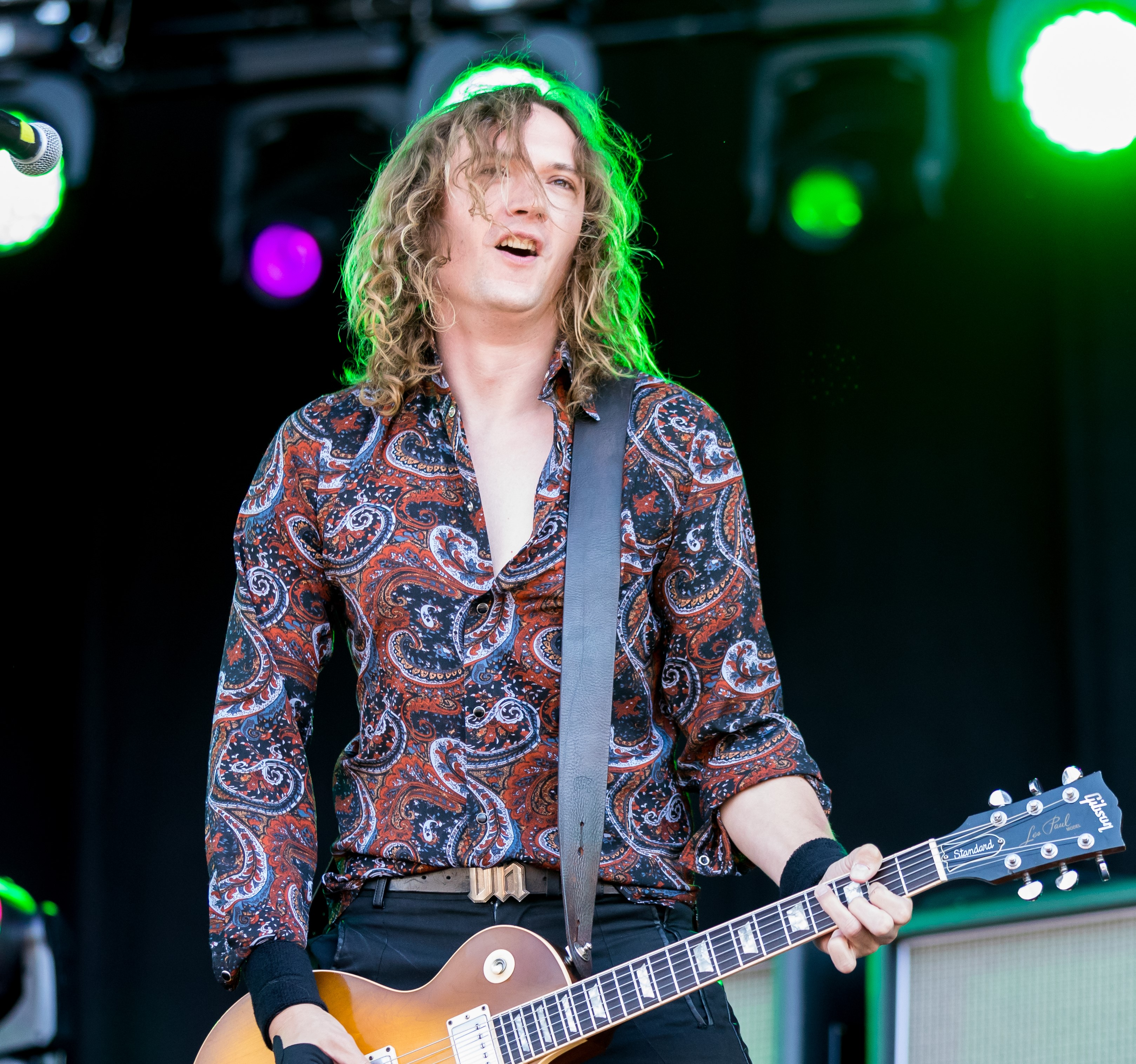
- Performing with the Darkness at Rock am Ring 2018

Background information
- Born: Daniel Francis Hawkins; 12 December 1976 (age 49); Chertsey, England
- Genres: Hard rock; glam metal; glam rock; heavy metal
- Occupation: Guitarist
- Years active: 2000–present
- Labels: PIAS; Atlantic; Must Destroy
- Website: thedarknesslive.com

Daniel Francis Hawkins (born 12 December 1976) is an English guitarist and producer, best known as a guitarist, co-founder and backing singer of the rock band the Darkness. The band, founded and fronted by his older brother Justin Hawkins, achieved notable mainstream success between 2002 and 2006. He also formerly played lead guitar for Stone Gods.

== Musical style and influences ==
He is influenced by hard rock and glam metal bands, including Led Zeppelin, Aerosmith, Def Leppard, Whitesnake, AC/DC, Queen, Mötley Crüe and Thin Lizzy.

== Biography ==
After moving to Lowestoft, Hawkins attended Kirkley High School and achieved good grades in his GCSEs before leaving his hometown behind for the bright lights and cosmopolitan lifestyle of Camden, London. From a young age, he aspired to be a musician, beginning on drums, moving on to bass and finally mastering the guitar. Back in his early days in his professional career, he worked as a session guitarist for various artists including Natalie Imbruglia. Previous bands include Vital Signs and Empire before the Darkness consisting of Justin Hawkins, Ed Graham, Frankie Poullain and later, Richie Edwards, became a mainstream success. With The Darkness he has won Brits, MTV and Kerrang awards and the prestigious Ivor Novello Award for songwriting in 2004. The Darkness split in 2006.

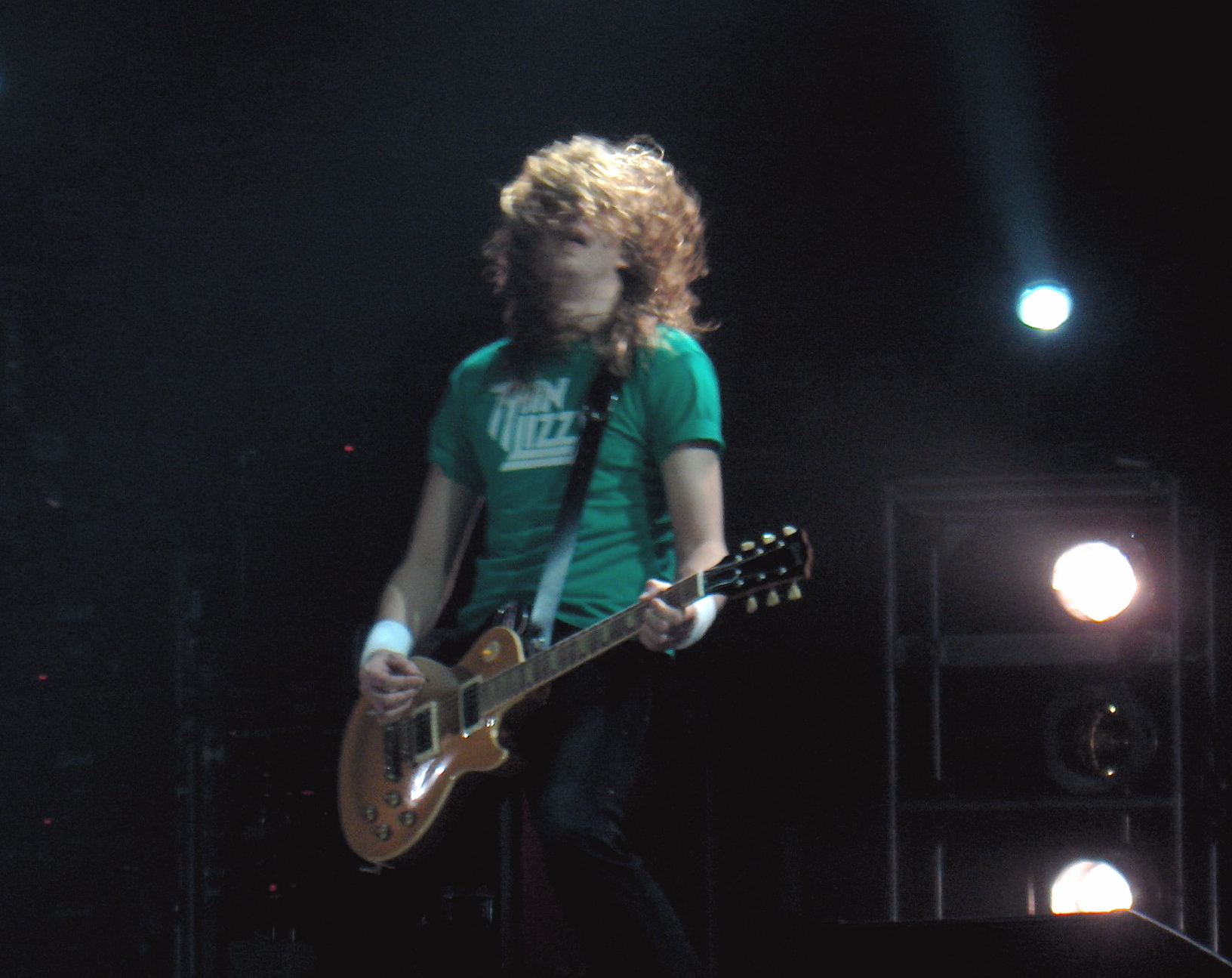
Dan Hawkins in 2006

In 2006, after the Darkness disbanded, Dan regrouped with bandmates Edwards and Graham to begin the band that would, after the recruitment of bassist Toby Macfarlaine, become Stone Gods. He played lead guitar in the band and saw their debut album Silver Spoons & Broken Bones, which was well received by critics. Stone Gods went on hiatus in 2011, preceding the reunion of The Darkness.

Hawkins was involved with the production process during the recording of the Darkness's albums, learning the skills alongside famed producer, Roy Thomas Baker. He co-produced B-sides for One Way Ticket to Hell... and Back. His first credited project was Stone Gods' album Silver Spoons & Broken Bones with the record producer, Nick Brine. Hawkins also built and owns a recording studio at Leeders Farm in Wymondham, Norfolk, which is run by Brine. Acts to use the studio include the Dandies, Arctic Monkeys, Seasick Steve, the Rifles, Teenage Fanclub, and Wild Beasts.

Hawkins composed the theme tune to the CBeebies television show Grace's Amazing Machines.

== Equipment ==
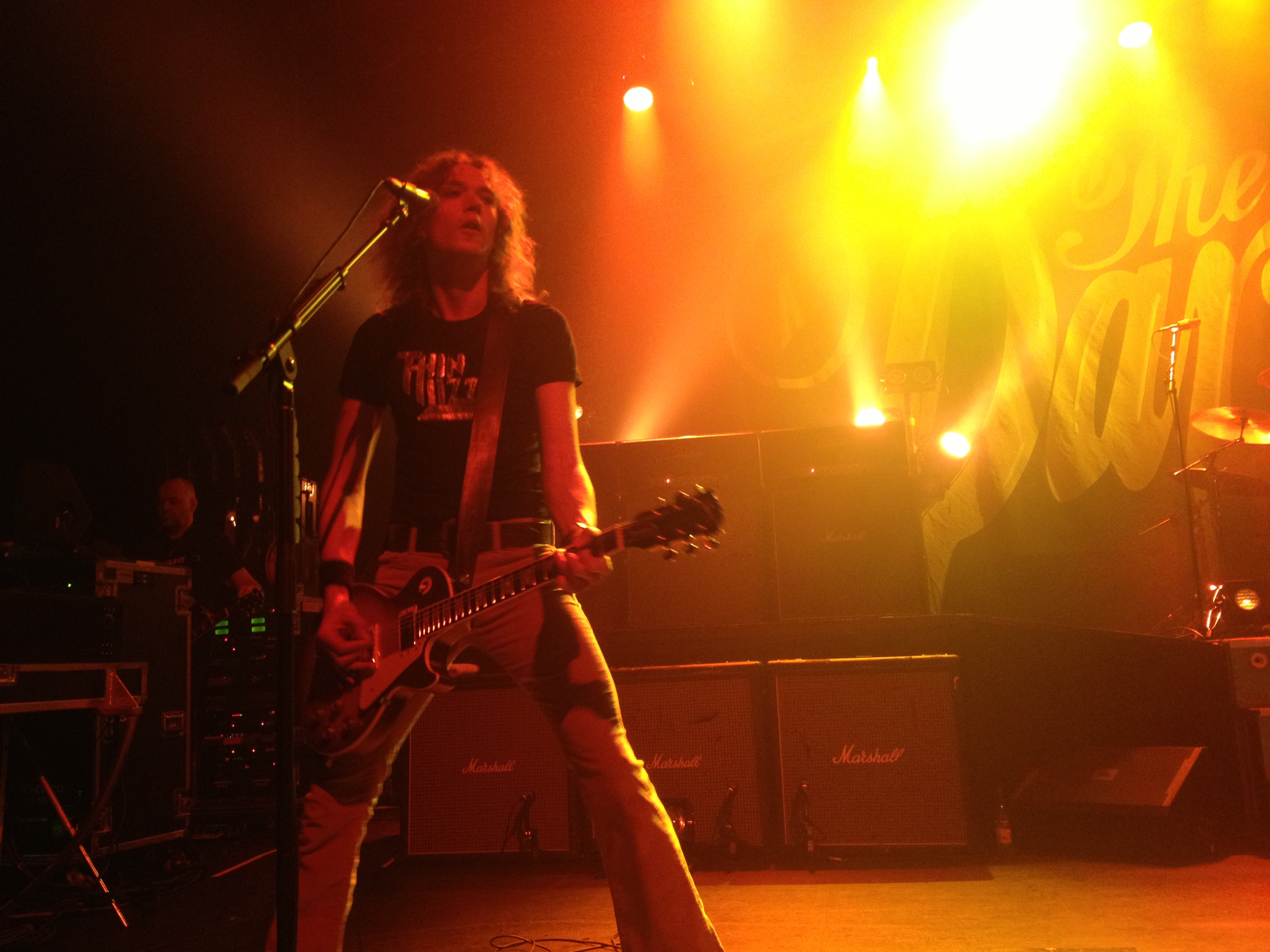
Dan Hawkins in 2013

Hawkins' guitar of choice is the Gibson Les Paul and his main instrument, both live and in the studio, is his well used 2000 Honeyburst Standard (nicknamed "Dune" after the David Lynch film) which he played extensively in the Darkness and in Stone Gods. Over the years he has owned and played several Les Paul Standards and currently tours with 6-8 of them including a second 2000 Honeyburst (nicknamed "Terry'), a Wine Red 1997 Standard (known as "UB40" which is used for the songs "Givin' Up" and "Friday Night"), a late 1970s Sunburst B-stock formerly owned by the guitarist from the band Sputnik), a 2003 Goldtop (loaned from his guitar tech), a late 1990s Standard re-finished in white, and a 2013 Honeyburst Flametop.

During 2003-2006 he used a Gretsch Elliot Easton solid body for the song "Black Shuck" but this was sold to fund the recording of the second Stone Gods album. Another guitar that has not been seen during this reunion is a 2000 Standard in black (nicknamed 'Black Shuck') that was previously also used live. He also owns a Gibson Les Paul Custom Black Beauty which was originally handbuilt for Jimmy Page, but Page decided it was too heavy and rejected the instrument; Page is one of Hawkins's biggest influences. It is fitted with a Fishman Powerblend pickup and is used for the song "Love Is Only a Feeling". It is also known that when Dan was waiting for the arrival of a different humbucker to put into the instrument his then-guitar tech said that he had a Kent Armstrong prototype humbucker that was taken out of one of Angus Young's Gibson SGs. He fitted Angus's old humbucker to the guitar and liked the sound so much that he left it in.

Among a variety of amplifiers, his primary choices are Marshalls, particularly the 1959 SLP and Handwired Re-Issue models (as is exemplified in videos of the Darkness live at the London Astoria in 2003). For his dirtier sounds in Stone Gods, he played a Marshall JCM 800 Re-Issue head through Marshall 1960AX/BX cabinets, combined with a Diezel Herbert head. He has also been seen using both a Vox AC30 combo and a Wizard Modern Classic head to complement his several Marshall stacks. For effects, Hawkins uses a vintage Ibanez TS-808 Tube Screamer pedal as well as units manufactured by Electro-Harmonix, MXR, Strymon and Devi Ever.

A large amount of Hawkins' distinct tone comes from his use of heavy gauge strings. He uses Ernie Ball Beefy Slinkys (typically; 11, 15, 22p, 30w, 42w, 54w) and Jim Dunlop Maxi Grip 0.73mm picks.
