= List of UK Rock & Metal Singles Chart number ones of 2004 =

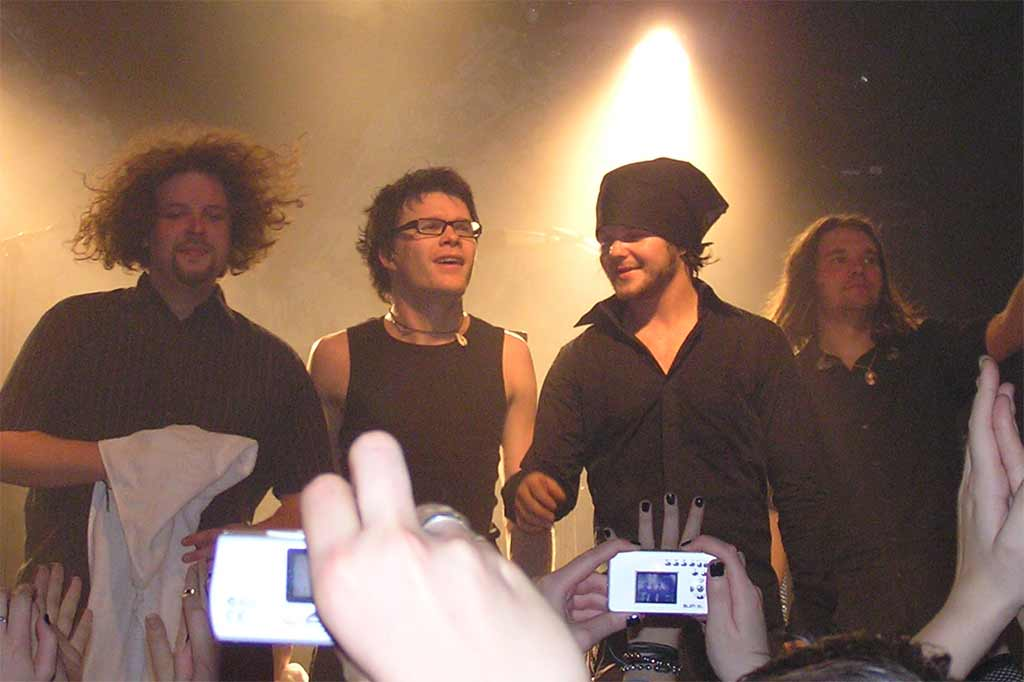
"In the Shadows" by The Rasmus was the longest-running number one of 2004, spending ten weeks atop the chart.

The UK Rock & Metal Singles Chart is a record chart which ranks the best-selling rock and heavy metal songs in the United Kingdom. Compiled and published by the Official Charts Company, the data is based on each track's weekly physical sales, digital downloads and streams. In 2004, there were 24 singles that topped the 52 published charts. The first number-one single of the year was "Christmas Time (Don't Let the Bells End)" by The Darkness, which topped the chart for the first time in the final week of 2003 and spent the first three weeks of the year and one in march at number one. The final number-one single of the year was "Boulevard of Broken Dreams" by Green Day, which spent the final three weeks of the year atop the chart and remained at number one for the first two weeks of 2005.

The most successful song on the UK Rock & Metal Singles Chart in 2004 was "In the Shadows" by Finnish band The Rasmus, which spent ten weeks at number one. The band also spent two weeks at number one with follow-up single "Guilty". "Come Get Some" by Rooster spent six weeks at number one, while The Darkness (with "Christmas Time (Don't Let the Bells End)" and "Love Is Only a Feeling") and Green Day (with "American Idiot" and "Boulevard of Broken Dreams") each spent six weeks at number one with two releases. "Last Summer" by Lostprophets spent three weeks at number one, while three additional singles – "Run" by Snow Patrol, "The Reason" by Hoobastank and "Slither" by Velvet Revolver – spent two weeks each at number one on the chart during the year.

== Chart history ==
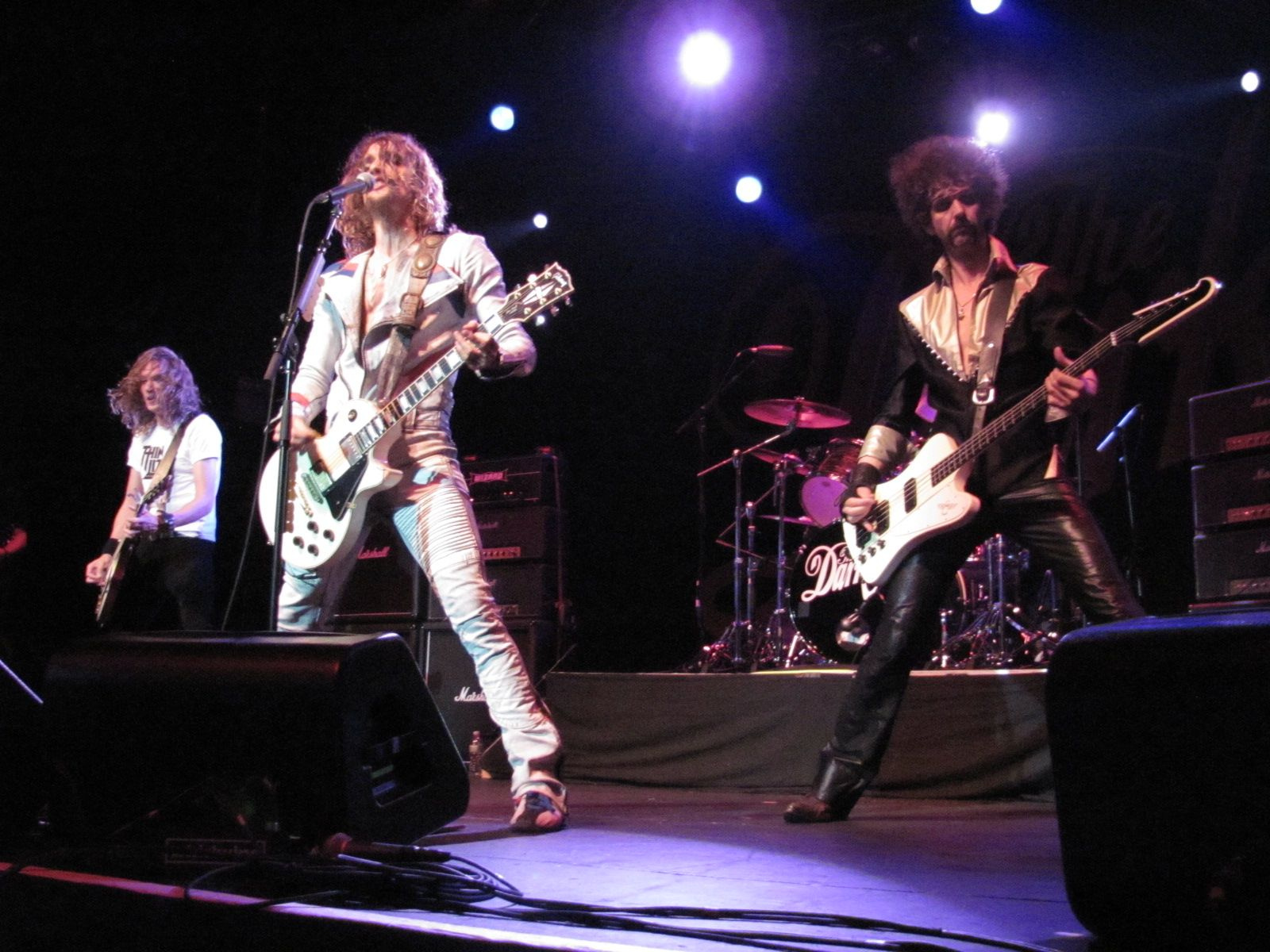
The Darkness spent six weeks at number one in 2004 with "Christmas Time (Don't Let the Bells End)" (four weeks) and "Love Is Only a Feeling" (two weeks).

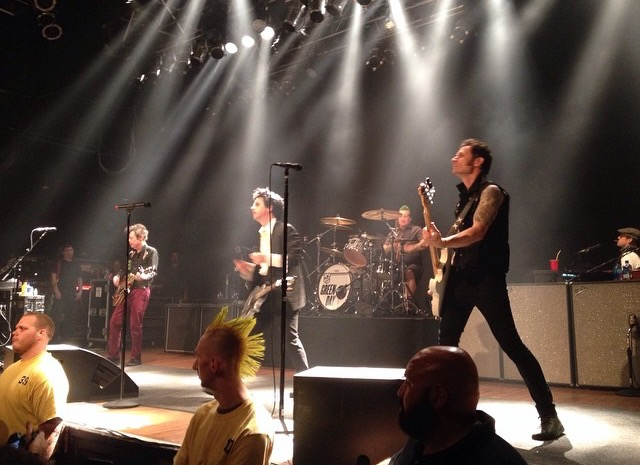
Green Day topped the chart in 2004 with "American Idiot" and "Boulevard of Broken Dreams", each of which spent three weeks atop the chart.

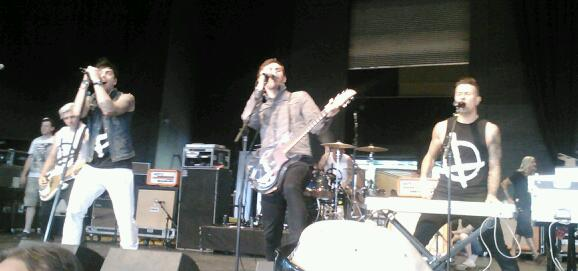
Lostprophets spent three weeks at number one with "Last Summer".

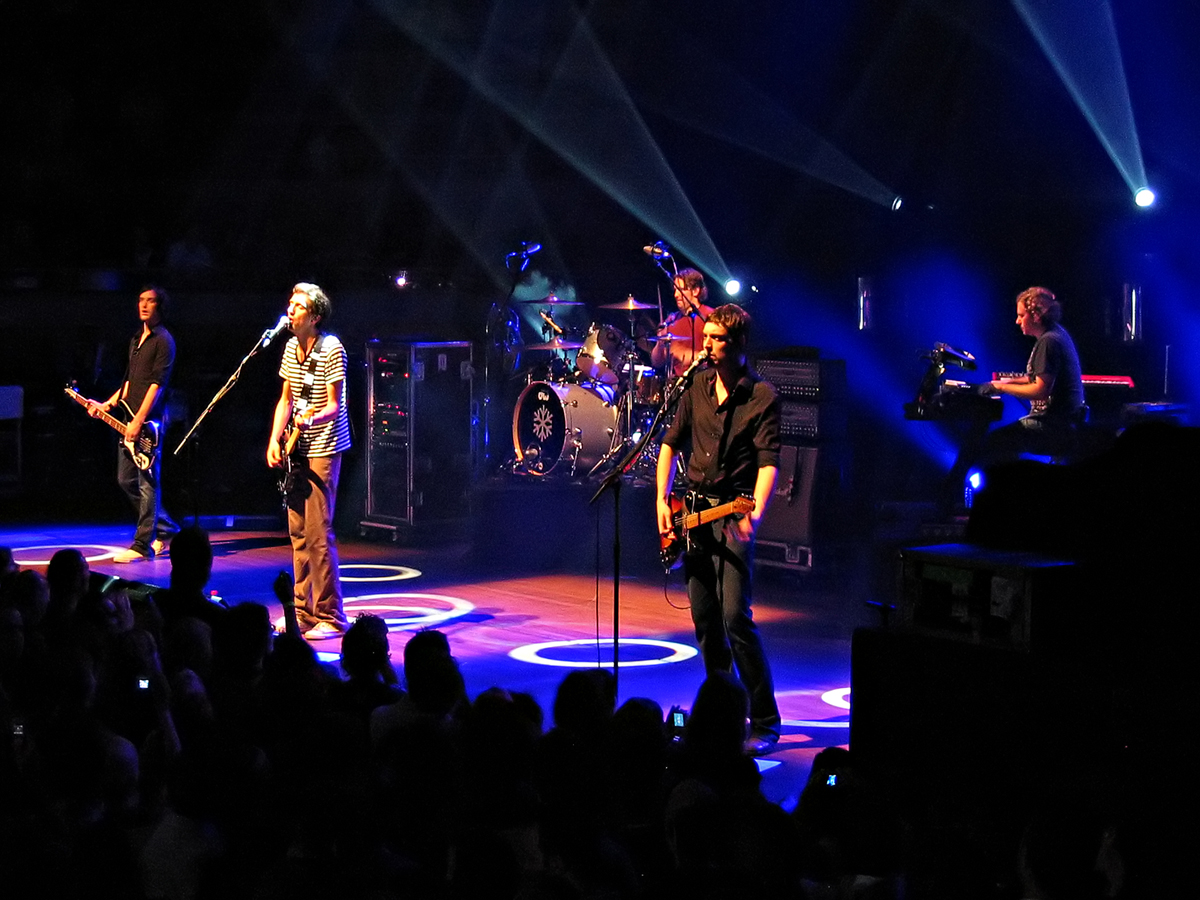
Snow Patrol's "Run" was number one on the chart for two weeks.

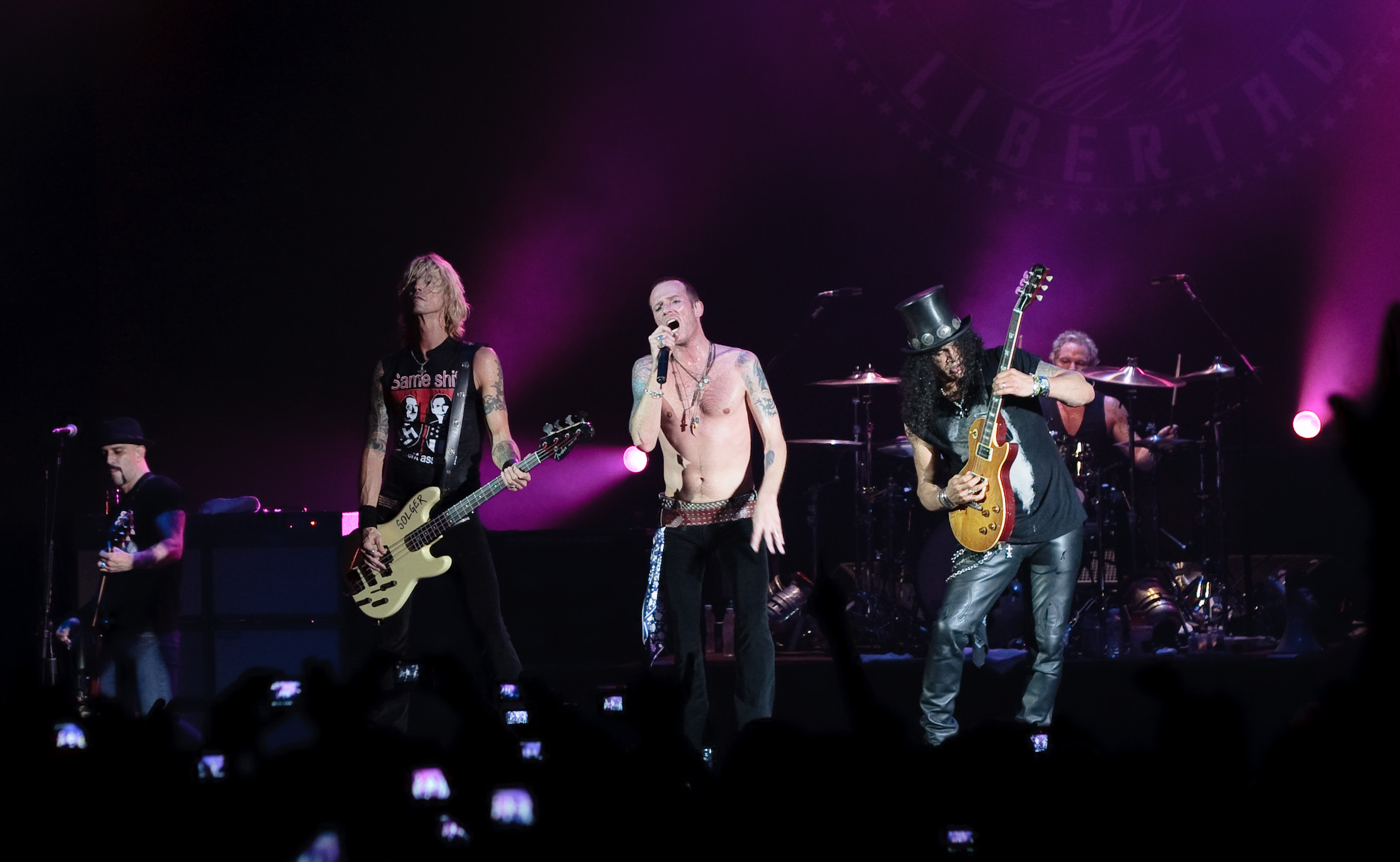
Velvet Revolver topped the chart for two weeks with "Slither".

Issue date	Single	Artist(s)	Record label(s)	Ref.
3 January	"Christmas Time (Don't Let the Bells End)"	The Darkness	Must Destroy	
10 January	"Christmas Time (Don't Let the Bells End)"	The Darkness	Must Destroy	
17 January	"Christmas Time (Don't Let the Bells End)"	The Darkness	Must Destroy	
24 January	"The Funeral of Hearts"	HIM	RCA	
31 January	"Hit That"	The Offspring	Columbia	
7 February	"Run"	Snow Patrol	Fiction	
14 February	"Run"	Snow Patrol	Fiction	
21 February	"Can't Turn Back"	Speedway	Innocent	
28 February	"What You Get"	Hundred Reasons	Columbia	
6 March	"Tropical Ice-Land"	The Fiery Furnaces	Rough Trade	
13 March	"Televators"	The Mars Volta	Universal	
20 March	"Christmas Time (Don't Let the Bells End)"	The Darkness	Must Destroy	
27 March	"Feelin' Way Too Damn Good"	Nickelback	Roadrunner	
3 April	"Love Is Only a Feeling"	The Darkness	Must Destroy	
10 April	"Love Is Only a Feeling"	The Darkness	Must Destroy	
17 April	"In the Shadows"	The Rasmus	Universal	
24 April	"In the Shadows"	The Rasmus	Universal	
1 May	"In the Shadows"	The Rasmus	Universal	
8 May	"In the Shadows"	The Rasmus	Universal	
15 May	"In the Shadows"	The Rasmus	Universal	
22 May	"In the Shadows"	The Rasmus	Universal	
29 May	"In the Shadows"	The Rasmus	Universal	
5 June	"In the Shadows"	The Rasmus	Universal	
12 June	"The Reason"	Hoobastank	Mercury	
19 June	"The Reason"	Hoobastank	Mercury	
26 June	"Duality"	Slipknot	Roadrunner	
3 July	"In the Shadows"	Rasmus	Universal	
10 July	"I Could Be an Angle"	The Eighties Matchbox B-Line Disaster	Island	
17 July	"In the Shadows"	Rasmus	Universal	
24 July	"Slither"	Velvet Revolver	RCA	
31 July	"Slither"	Velvet Revolver	RCA	
7 August	"World's on Fire"	Breed 77	Albert	
14 August	"Mein Teil"	Rammstein	Universal	
21 August	"Guilty"	The Rasmus	Universal	
28 August	"Guilty"	The Rasmus	Universal	
4 September	"Last Summer"	Lostprophets	Visible Noise	
11 September	"Last Summer"	Lostprophets	Visible Noise	
18 September	"Last Summer"	Lostprophets	Visible Noise	
25 September	"American Idiot"	Green Day	Reprise	
2 October	"American Idiot"	Green Day	Reprise	
9 October	"American Idiot"	Green Day	Reprise	
16 October	"Predictable"	Good Charlotte	Epic	
23 October	"Come Get Some"	Rooster	Brightside	
30 October	"Come Get Some"	Rooster	Brightside	
6 November	"Come Get Some"	Rooster	Brightside	
13 November	"Come Get Some"	Rooster	Brightside	
20 November	"Come Get Some"	Rooster	Brightside	
27 November	"Come Get Some"	Rooster	Brightside	
4 December	"I Love You More Than Rock n' Roll"	Thunder	STC	
11 December	"Boulevard of Broken Dreams"	Green Day	Reprise	
18 December	"Boulevard of Broken Dreams"	Green Day	Reprise	
25 December	"Boulevard of Broken Dreams"	Green Day	Reprise	

== See also ==
- 2004 in British music
- List of UK Rock & Metal Albums Chart number ones of 2004
