= In the Shadows (song) =

2003 single by the Rasmus

Single by the Rasmus

from the album Dead Letters
- B-side: "If You Ever"
- Released: 10 January 2003
- Genre: Alternative rock
- Length: 4:20
- Label: Playground Music Scandinavia; Dynasty
- Songwriters: Aki Hakala; Eero Heinonen; Pauli Rantasalmi; Lauri Ylönen
- Producers: Mikael Nord Andersson; Martin Hansen

The Rasmus singles chronology
| "Heartbreaker" / "Days" (2002) | "In the Shadows" (2003) | "In My Life" (2003) |

Music video
- "In the Shadows" on YouTube

Audio sample
- "In the Shadows": file; help

"In the Shadows" is a song by Finnish alternative rock band the Rasmus, included on the group's fifth studio album, Dead Letters (2003). Released in Finland in January 2003, the single achieved considerable chart success throughout Europe and Oceania, topping the charts of Finland, Germany, Hungary, and New Zealand and peaking at No. 3 in the United Kingdom. It was also successful in South America, reaching No. 1 in Bolivia, Chile, and Paraguay. The song was nominated for the Kerrang! Award for Best Single in 2004.

== Composition ==
"In the Shadows" is written in the key of F♯ minor. The chorus is based on the "millennial whoop" vocal pattern, and is considered the earliest 21st-century example of this tool in popular music. The "whoop" did exist before, but only became ubiquitous after "In the Shadows".

== Music videos ==
There are four different music videos for the song: the Finnish version, the European version, the American version, and a fourth, simplified version. A new version of the song, co-written by and featuring Ukrainian rap group Kalush Orchestra, is accompanied by a music video.

=== Finnish version ===
Widely known as Bandit Version, directed in Helsinki on 13 December 2002, shows the Rasmus performing on a stage that resembles a helipad, and are in the process of stealing from a bank when the police arrive unexpectedly. Lauri Ylönen is almost caught, but manages to grab onto the safe-door, which is being dragged behind the tow-car that the group uses for the robbery, and goes skidding down the road. He falls off and runs into the woods where police dogs find him. Drummer Aki Hakala then ushers him into the car where Lauri makes his lucky escape and the car drives off. The video was included in the soundtrack of Finnish movie Pahat pojat and footage from the film was used in the video.

=== European version ===
This is the most famous version of music video, also known as the Crow Version. The band are placed on a stage in a nondescript location and perform the song. Around the room there are crows flying around, who later break through the small rectangular windows. Towards the end, one crow breaks a light on the ceiling with its wings and the band performs in a shower of sparks. In the end, the band transforms into feathers.

=== US and UK version ===
In the video, directed by Philipp Stölzl in Bucharest, Romania, the band are performing a concert in what looks to be an old Victorian mansion. During the verses, a maid is seen constantly busy serving the masters of the house in what appears to be the past of the mansion. The maid sees (lead singer) Lauri and the concert in mirrors on the walls, which causes her to become distracted, making mistakes and dropping trays. Eventually, while despairing over her errors in her room, she sees Lauri and all the fans in her mirror, while the master of the house is approaching with somebody else, possibly the head maid, presumably to reprimand the new maid. Lauri tugs her through the mirror in her room to where they are performing. She then finishes watching the concert. It concludes with the master of the house and the others entering to find the maid's room empty.

=== Fourth version ===
The Rasmus are seen performing in a plain-looking room, similar in appearance to where they perform in the "Crow" version.

=== Kalush Orchestra version ===
In 2022, the group released a new version of the song, titled "In the Shadows of Ukraine" and featuring Ukrainian rap group Kalush Orchestra. The music video for this version is directed by Leonid Kolosovskyi.

== Track listings ==
Scandinavian maxi-CD single
| No. | Title | Length |
|---|---|---|
| 1. | "In the Shadows" | 4:18 |
| 2. | "In the Shadows" (revamped) | 3:03 |
| 3. | "First Day of My Life" (acoustic demo) | 3:11 |

European CD single
| No. | Title | Length |
|---|---|---|
| 1. | "In the Shadows" | 4:18 |
| 2. | "In the Shadows" (revamped) | 3:03 |

UK limited-edition 7-inch picture disc
| No. | Title | Length |
|---|---|---|
| 1. | "In the Shadows" |
| 2. | "If You Ever" |

UK CD single
| No. | Title | Length |
|---|---|---|
| 1. | "In the Shadows" |
| 2. | "Everything You Say" |
| 3. | "Days" |
| 4. | "In the Shadows" (video) |

US CD single
| No. | Title | Length |
|---|---|---|
| 1. | "In the Shadows" | 4:18 |
| 2. | "Guilty" | 3:42 |
| 3. | "In the Shadows" (video) | 3:54 |

== Charts ==
=== Weekly charts ===
Original version

| Chart (2003–2004) | Peak position |
|---|---|
| Australia (ARIA) | 23 |
| Austria (Ö3 Austria Top 40) | 2 |
| Belgium (Ultratop 50 Flanders) | 6 |
| Belgium (Ultratop 50 Wallonia) | 4 |
| Bolivia (Notimex) | 1 |
| Canada CHR/Pop Top 30 (Radio & Records) | 19 |
| Chile (Notimex) | 1 |
| CIS Airplay (TopHit) | 46 |
| CIS Airplay (TopHit) Remix | 7 |
| Czech Republic (IFPI) | 22 |
| Denmark (Tracklisten) | 6 |
| Ecuador (Notimex) | 5 |
| Europe (Eurochart Hot 100) | 6 |
| Finland (Suomen virallinen lista) | 1 |
| France (SNEP) | 6 |
| Germany (GfK) | 1 |
| Hungary (Rádiós Top 40) | 1 |
| Hungary (Dance Top 40) | 4 |
| Ireland (IRMA) | 7 |
| Italy (FIMI) | 2 |
| Netherlands (Dutch Top 40) | 5 |
| Netherlands (Single Top 100) | 6 |
| New Zealand (Recorded Music NZ) | 1 |
| Paraguay (Notimex) | 1 |
| Peru (Notimex) | 3 |
| Romania (Romanian Top 100) | 70 |
| Russia Airplay (TopHit) | 31 |
| Russia Airplay (TopHit) Remix | 3 |
| Scottish Singles Sales (Official Charts) | 3 |
| Sweden (Sverigetopplistan) | 2 |
| Switzerland (Schweizer Hitparade) | 2 |
| Ukraine Airplay (TopHit) | 39 |
| Ukraine Airplay (TopHit) Remix | 8 |
| UK Singles (Official Charts) | 3 |
| UK Rock & Metal (Official Charts) | 1 |

| Chart (2022–2025) | Peak position |
|---|---|
| Poland (Polish Airplay Top 100) | 42 |
| UK Singles Downloads (Official Charts) | 46 |

Kalush Orchestra featuring the Rasmus

| Chart (2022) | Peak position |
|---|---|
| Ukraine Airplay (TopHit) | 26 |

=== Year-end charts ===
| Chart (2003) | Position |
|---|---|
| Austria (Ö3 Austria Top 40) | 9 |
| Belgium (Ultratop 50 Flanders) | 99 |
| CIS Airplay (TopHit) | 64 |
| CIS Airplay (TopHit) Remix | 9 |
| Germany (Media Control GfK) | 10 |
| Italy (FIMI) | 27 |
| Netherlands (Dutch Top 40) | 16 |
| Netherlands (Single Top 100) | 43 |
| Russia Airplay (TopHit) | 48 |
| Russia Airplay (TopHit) Remix | 5 |
| Sweden (Hitlistan) | 4 |
| Switzerland (Schweizer Hitparade) | 10 |
| Ukraine Airplay (TopHit) | 71 |
| Ukraine Airplay (TopHit) Remix | 13 |

| Chart (2004) | Position |
|---|---|
| Australia (ARIA) | 90 |
| Belgium (Ultratop 50 Flanders) | 75 |
| Belgium (Ultratop 50 Wallonia) | 24 |
| CIS Airplay (TopHit) Remix | 164 |
| France (SNEP) | 28 |
| Hungary (Rádiós Top 40) | 26 |
| Italy (FIMI) | 17 |
| New Zealand (RIANZ) | 18 |
| Russia Airplay (TopHit) Remix | 137 |
| Switzerland (Schweizer Hitparade) | 71 |
| Ukraine Airplay (TopHit) Remix | 168 |
| UK Singles (OCC) | 22 |

| Chart (2022) | Position |
|---|---|
| Ukraine Airplay (TopHit) | 139 |

== Certifications ==
| Region | Certification | Certified units/sales |
|---|---|---|
| Finland (Musiikkituottajat) | Gold | 5,955 |
| Germany (BVMI) | Platinum | 300,000^{‡} |
| New Zealand (RMNZ) | Gold | 5,000^{*} |
| Sweden (GLF) | Gold | 15,000^{^} |
| Switzerland (IFPI Switzerland) | Gold | 20,000^{^} |
| United Kingdom (BPI) | Gold | 400,000^{‡} |
^{*} Sales figures based on certification alone.^{^} Shipments figures based on certification alone.^{‡} Sales+streaming figures based on certification alone.

== Release history ==
| Region | Date | Format(s) | Label(s) | Ref. |
|---|---|---|---|---|
| Finland | 10 January 2003 | CD | Playground Music Scandinavia; Dynasty | |
| Germany | 30 June 2003 | CD | Playground Music Scandinavia; Dynasty; Motor Music; Universal | |
| United Kingdom | 5 April 2004 | 7-inch vinyl; CD | Playground Music Scandinavia; Dynasty; Motor Music; Island; Universal | |
| Australia | 3 May 2004 | CD | Playground Music Scandinavia; Dynasty; Motor Music; Island; Universal | |

== In popular culture ==
"In the Shadows" was released for Guitar Hero: World Tour as downloadable content. It is available as either a single track or as part of the European Track Pack 03 alongside "Break It Out" by Vanilla Sky and "C'est comme ça" by Les Rita Mitsouko. The song was also unlockable in Guitar Rock Tour.
