= Frenemies (Glee) =

- Glee episode
- Episode no.: Season 5 Episode 9
- Directed by: Bradley Buecker
- Written by: Ned Martel
- Production code: 5ARC09
- Original air date: February 25, 2014

Guest appearances
- Peter Facinelli as Rupert Campion; Iqbal Theba as Principal Figgins; Dot-Marie Jones as Shannon Beiste; Adam Lambert as Elliott Gilbert; Lauren Potter as Becky Jackson; Bonnie Bailey-Reed as the dissatisfied Spotlight Diner customer

Episode chronology
← Previous "Previously Unaired Christmas"	Next → "Trio"
- Glee season 5

"Frenemies" is the ninth episode and spring premiere of the fifth season of the American musical television series Glee, and the ninety-seventh episode overall. Written by Ned Martel and directed by Bradley Buecker, it aired on Fox in the United States on February 25, 2014. Effective with this episode, the show moves back to Tuesday nights at 8:00 pm Eastern time from Thursday nights at 9:00 pm Eastern time.

== Plot ==
Continuing from where the show had left off, Tina Cohen-Chang (Jenna Ushkowitz) is distressed that she's only on the waiting list for Brown University, and Artie Abrams (Kevin McHale) cheers her up through a performance of "Whenever I Call You Friend". Their relationship sours when Principal Sue Sylvester (Jane Lynch) announces that they both have equal qualifications to be class valedictorian and will have a "speech-off" to decide who will get it. In addition to this, Artie and Tina also compete for a solo at Nationals through a performance of "My Lovin' (You're Never Gonna Get It)", during which Tina accidentally pushes Artie out of his wheelchair.

In New York, Santana Lopez (Naya Rivera) grows dissatisfied with her prospects in light of Rachel Berry's (Lea Michele) achievements on Broadway, and auditions to be Rachel's understudy in Funny Girl through a performance of "Don't Rain on My Parade", copying Rachel's signature moves whilst giving her a stinging memory of her 'Choke' audition. Rachel is infuriated, and trades insults with Santana. Their rivalry is furthered when Santana gets the job, and director Rupert Campion (Peter Facinelli) announces that the show is using the fact that they came from the same school in Ohio as part of the show's publicity.

Meanwhile, Kurt Hummel (Chris Colfer) suspects that Elliott Gilbert (Adam Lambert) is trying to steal the band from him, and decides to get closer by pretending to want guitar lessons. Elliott takes Kurt to a guitar store, where they perform "I Believe in a Thing Called Love" and realize they enjoy spending time together. Elliott reassures Kurt he is not trying to upstage him. Kurt uploads a picture of them together, giving Blaine Anderson (Darren Criss) slight feelings of discomfort.

At the speech-off, Artie and Tina apologize to one another by praising each other in their speeches. Sue's assembled panel, consisted of Will Schuester (Matthew Morrison), Coach Shannon Beiste (Dot-Marie Jones) and Janitor Figgins (Iqbal Theba), ends up tied, and Sue instead gives valedictorian to Blaine, making Artie and Tina co-salutatorians. While Blaine, Artie and Tina gather to sing "Breakaway" with their friends, Rachel decides to move out of the loft and cut ties with Santana, making their friendship come to an end.

== Production ==
The episode was in production by November 20, 2013, and Chris Colfer tweeted about "pole dancing" in a scene that morning with Adam Lambert.

Effective with this episode, the show moves from its broadcast time of 9:00 pm Eastern time on Thursday nights, its time slot for the fourth season and for the fall portion of the fifth season, to Tuesday nights at 8:00 pm Eastern time.

Special guest star Peter Facinelli returns as Rupert Campion, the Funny Girl director. Other recurring characters in this episode include McKinley football coach Shannon Beiste (Dot-Marie Jones), janitor and former principal Figgins (Iqbal Theba) and cheerleader Becky Jackson (Lauren Potter), and NYU student and Pamela Lansbury bandmember Elliott Gilbert (Lambert).

Seven songs from the episode are being released as singles: Kelly Clarkson's "Breakaway" featuring Darren Criss, McHale, and Ushkowitz; "Whenever I Call You Friend" by Kenny Loggins and Stevie Nicks and "My Lovin' (You're Never Gonna Get It)" by En Vogue, both performed by McHale and Ushkowitz; "Don't Rain on My Parade" from Funny Girl featuring Rivera; "Every Breath You Take" by the Police and "Brave" by Sara Bareilles, both performed by Michele and Rivera; and The Darkness' "I Believe in a Thing Called Love" featuring Lambert and Chris Colfer.

== Critical reception ==
"Frenemies" met with positive reviews from critics. Daniel Sperling from Digital Spy said: "'Frenemies' is a decent return for Glee, one that wisely ditches the newbies to explore and test the bonds between our favourite characters in great, if occasionally painful, detail". Christine Petralia from BuddyTV said: "The last few episodes last year had me not loving Glee too much, but this episode has turned it around." Laura Frances from Screen Crave said: "The episode was one of the strongest we've seen in a long time." Matt Richenthal from TV Fanatic said: "Glee made a triumphant return to Fox last night, airing an episode that helped us forget about that debacle of a Christmas special."
