= First Day of My Life =

First Day of My Life may refer to:

- "First Day of My Life" (The Rasmus song), 2003
- "First Day of My Life" (Bright Eyes song), 2005
- "First Day of My Life" (Melanie C song), 2004
