= List of UK Rock & Metal Albums Chart number ones of 2004 =

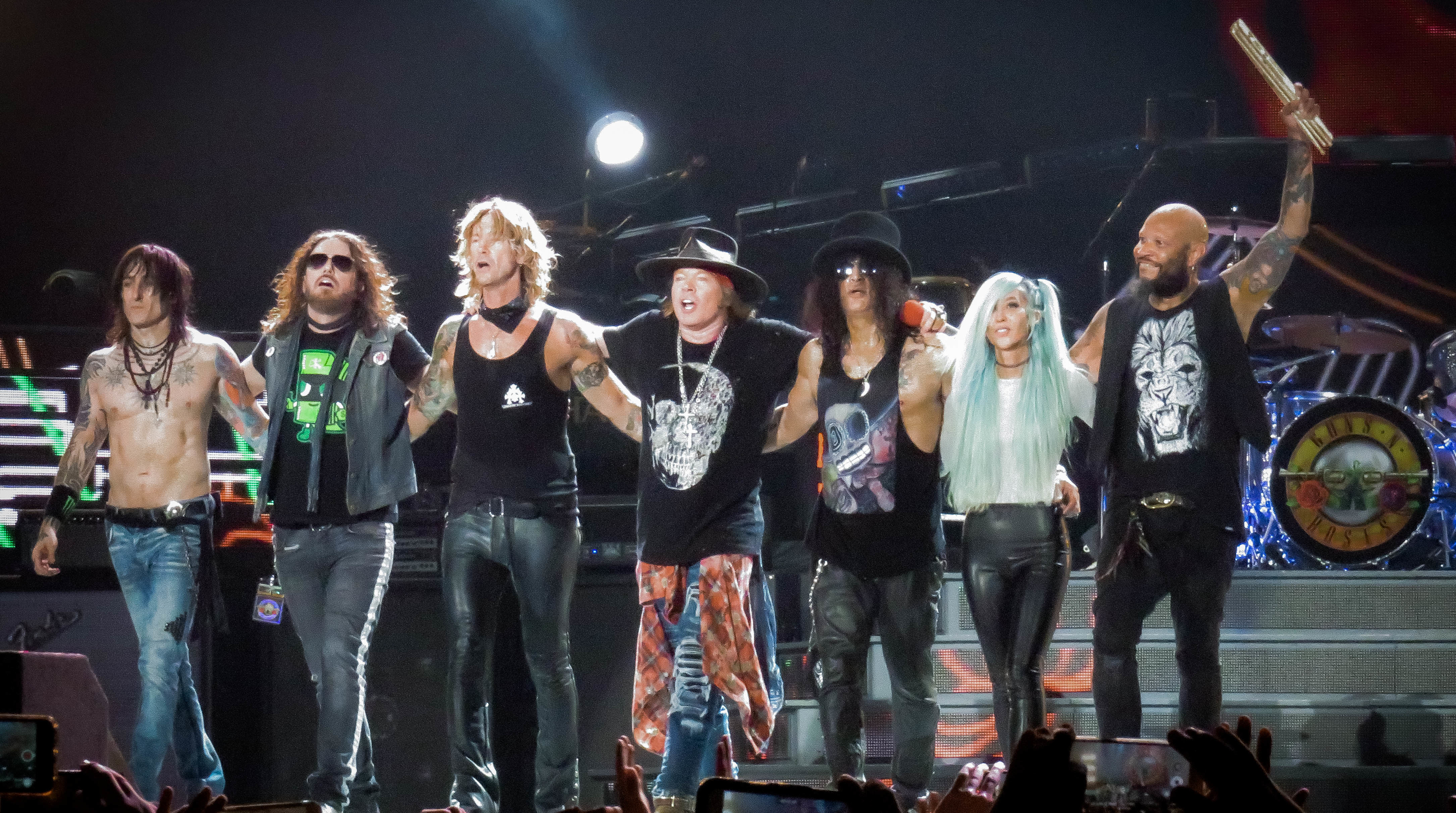
Greatest Hits by Guns N' Roses was the longest-running UK Rock & Metal Albums Chart number-one album of 2004, spending 12 weeks atop the chart.

The UK Rock & Metal Albums Chart is a record chart which ranks the best-selling rock and heavy metal albums in the United Kingdom. Compiled and published by the Official Charts Company, the data is based on each album's weekly physical sales, digital downloads and streams. In 2004, there were 19 albums that topped the 52 published charts. The first number-one album of the year was Permission to Land, the debut studio album by The Darkness, which remained at number one for the opening week of the year at the end of a five-week run which began on 6 December 2003. The final number-one album of the year was Green Day's seventh studio album American Idiot, which spent the last nine weeks of the year (and the first nine weeks of 2005) at number one in its second spell of the year at the top of the chart.

The most successful album on the UK Rock & Metal Albums Chart in 2004 was Greatest Hits by Guns N' Roses, which spent a total of 12 weeks at number one over three spells, including a run of ten consecutive weeks between the week ending 27 March and the week ending 29 May. Greatest Hits was the best-selling rock and metal album of the year, ranking 11th in the UK End of Year Albums Chart. American Idiot also spent 12 weeks at number one in 2004, but was the 18th best-selling album of the year. Live in Hyde Park by Red Hot Chili Peppers was number one for five weeks, Evanescence's debut studio album Fallen topped the chart for four weeks, Permission to Land spent three weeks at number one, and Muse's Absolution and Papa Roach's Getting Away with Murder each spent two weeks at number one in 2004.

== Chart history ==
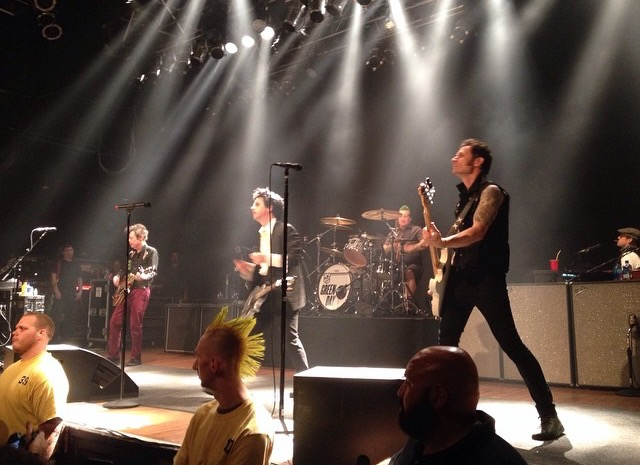
Green Day's seventh studio album also spent 12 weeks at number one in 2004, including the final nine weeks of the year.

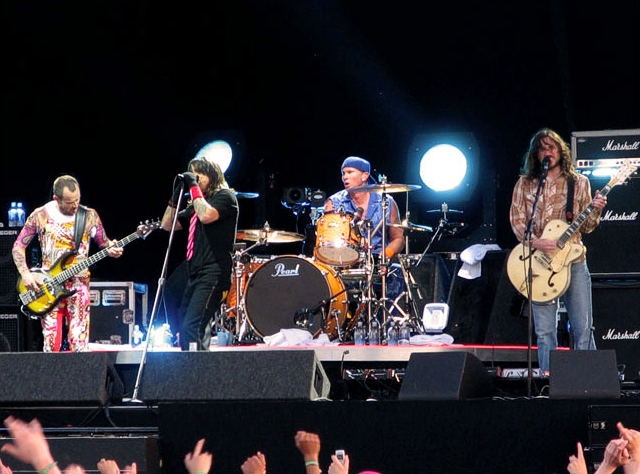
Red Hot Chili Peppers live album Live in Hyde Park was number one in 2004 for five consecutive weeks.

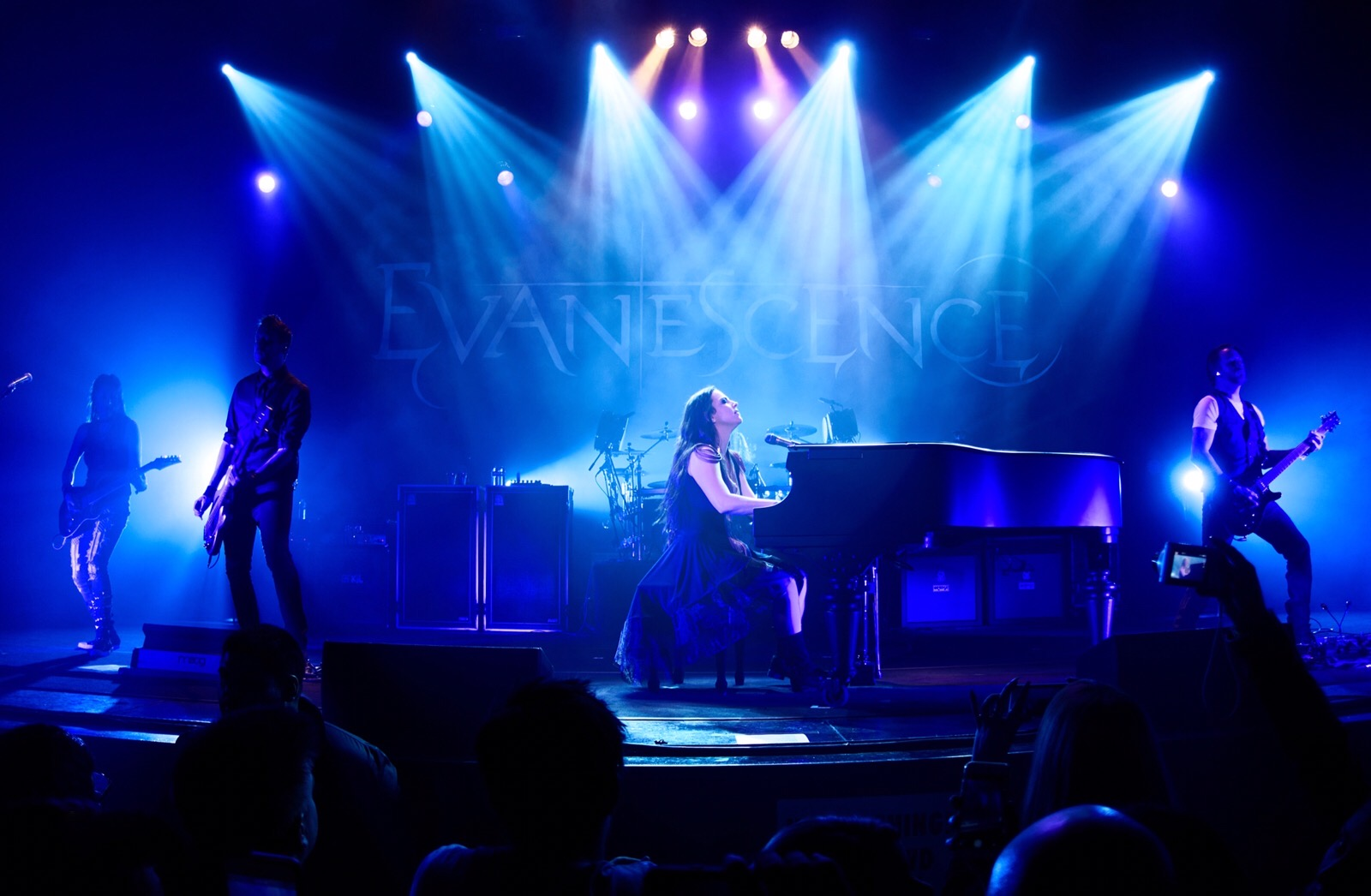
Evanescence spent four weeks at number one on the UK Rock & Metal Albums Chart in 2004 with Fallen.

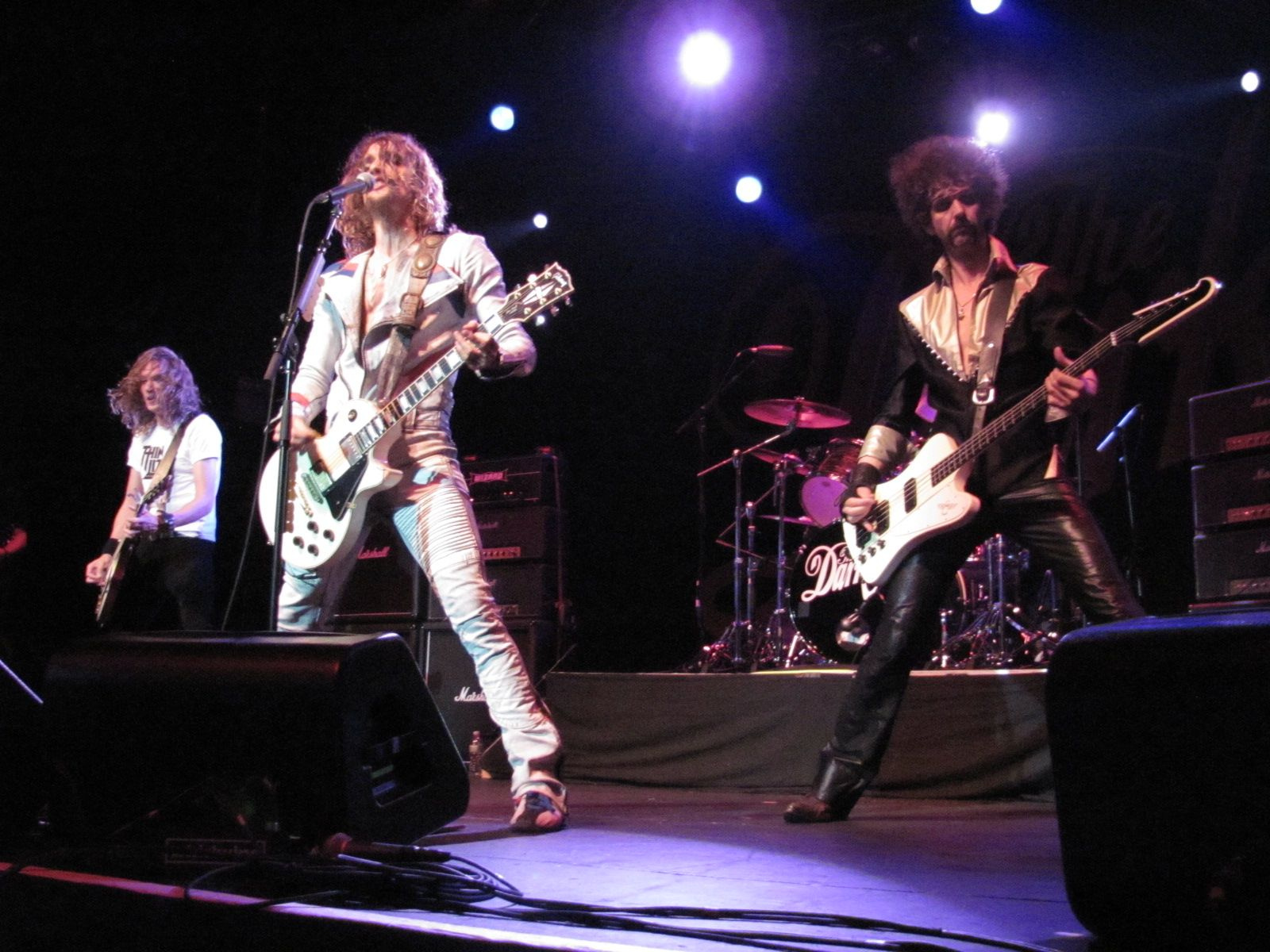
The Darkness topped the chart for three weeks in 2004 with Permission to Land, their debut studio album.

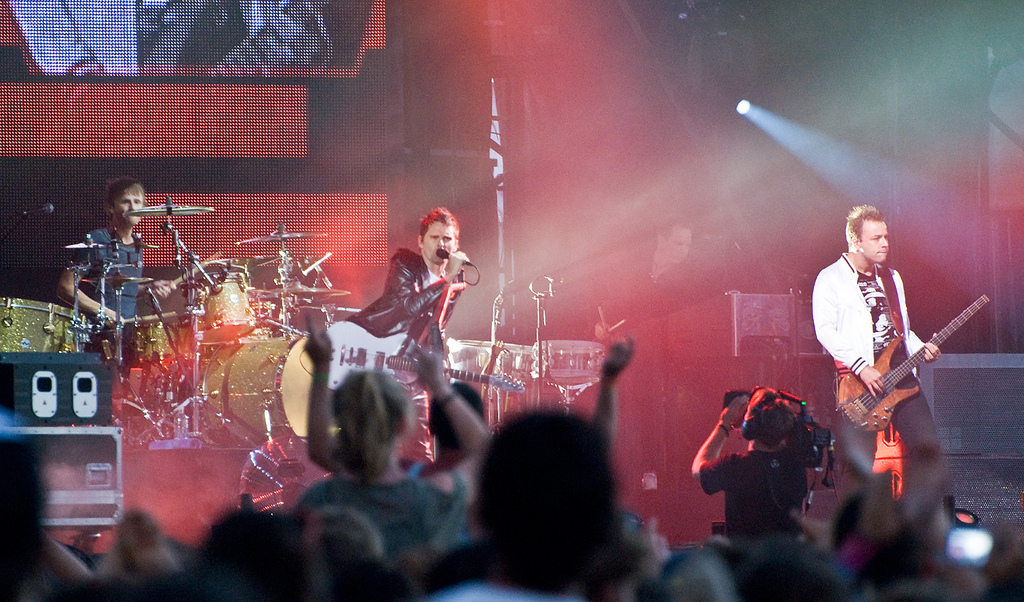
Muse's third album Absolution was number one for two weeks in 2004.

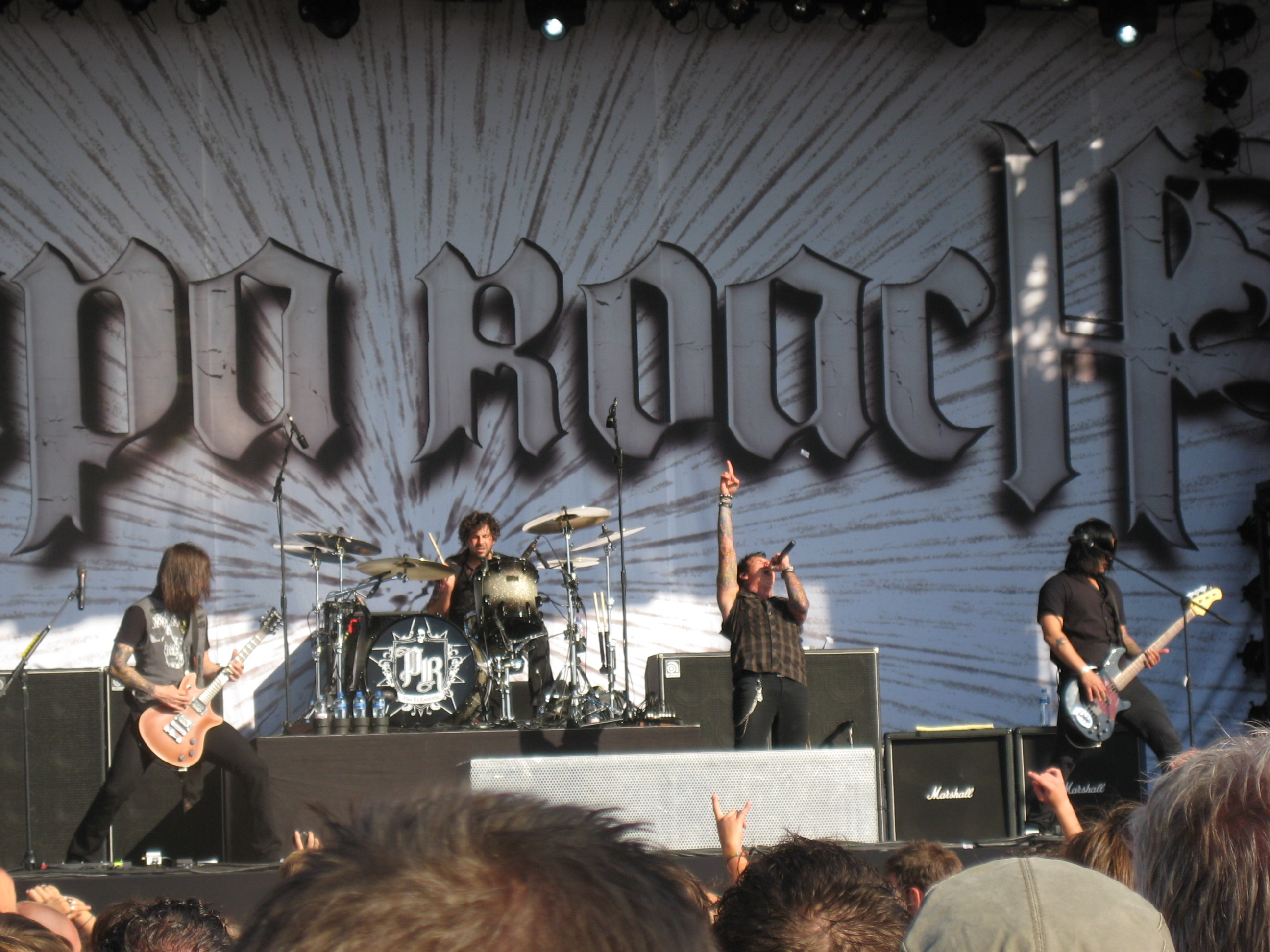
Getting Away with Murder, the fourth studio album by Papa Roach, spent two weeks at number one during 2004.

Key
†	Indicates best-selling rock album of 2004

Issue date	Album	Artist(s)	Record label(s)	Ref.
3 January	Permission to Land	The Darkness	Must Destroy	
10 January	Fallen	Evanescence	Epic	
17 January	Fallen	Evanescence	Epic	
24 January	Fallen	Evanescence	Epic	
31 January	Fallen	Evanescence	Epic	
7 February	Nightfreak and the Sons of Becker	The Coral	Deltasonic	
14 February	A Crow Left of the Murder...	Incubus	Epic	
21 February	Start Something	Lostprophets	Visible Noise	
28 February	Permission to Land	The Darkness	Must Destroy	
6 March	Permission to Land	The Darkness	Must Destroy	
13 March	Shatterproof Is Not a Challenge	Hundred Reasons	Columbia	
20 March	Blink-182	Blink-182	Geffen	
27 March	Greatest Hits †	Guns N' Roses	Geffen	
3 April	Greatest Hits †	Guns N' Roses	Geffen	
10 April	Greatest Hits †	Guns N' Roses	Geffen	
17 April	Greatest Hits †	Guns N' Roses	Geffen	
24 April	Greatest Hits †	Guns N' Roses	Geffen	
1 May	Greatest Hits †	Guns N' Roses	Geffen	
8 May	Greatest Hits †	Guns N' Roses	Geffen	
15 May	Greatest Hits †	Guns N' Roses	Geffen	
22 May	Greatest Hits †	Guns N' Roses	Geffen	
29 May	Greatest Hits †	Guns N' Roses	Geffen	
5 June	Vol. 3: (The Subliminal Verses)	Slipknot	Roadrunner	
12 June	Two	The Calling	RCA	
19 June	Contraband	Velvet Revolver	RCA	
26 June	Greatest Hits	Thin Lizzy	Universal	
3 July	Greatest Hits †	Guns N' Roses	Geffen	
10 July	Absolution	Muse	East West	
17 July	Absolution	Muse	East West	
24 July	Greatest Hits †	Guns N' Roses	Geffen	
31 July	The Best of Both Worlds	Van Halen	Warner Bros.	
7 August	Live in Hyde Park	Red Hot Chili Peppers	Warner Bros.	
14 August	Live in Hyde Park	Red Hot Chili Peppers	Warner Bros.	
21 August	Live in Hyde Park	Red Hot Chili Peppers	Warner Bros.	
28 August	Live in Hyde Park	Red Hot Chili Peppers	Warner Bros.	
4 September	Live in Hyde Park	Red Hot Chili Peppers	Warner Bros.	
11 September	Getting Away with Murder	Papa Roach	Geffen	
18 September	Getting Away with Murder	Papa Roach	Geffen	
25 September	The System Has Failed	Megadeth	Sanctuary	
2 October	American Idiot	Green Day	Reprise	
9 October	American Idiot	Green Day	Reprise	
16 October	American Idiot	Green Day	Reprise	
23 October	The Chronicles of Life and Death	Good Charlotte	Epic	
30 October	American Idiot	Green Day	Reprise	
6 November	American Idiot	Green Day	Reprise	
13 November	American Idiot	Green Day	Reprise	
20 November	American Idiot	Green Day	Reprise	
27 November	American Idiot	Green Day	Reprise	
4 December	American Idiot	Green Day	Reprise	
11 December	American Idiot	Green Day	Reprise	
18 December	American Idiot	Green Day	Reprise	
25 December	American Idiot	Green Day	Reprise	

== See also ==
- 2004 in British music
- List of UK Rock & Metal Singles Chart number ones of 2004
