= Dead Letters =

2003 studio album by the Rasmus

Studio album by the Rasmus
- Released: 21 March 2003
- Recorded: June–December 2002
- Studios: Nord Studios in Stockholm, Sweden
- Genre: Alternative rock
- Length: 52:14
- Label: Playground Music
- Producers: Martin Hansen; Mikael Nord

The Rasmus chronology
Into (2001)	Dead Letters (2003)	Hide from the Sun (2005)

Singles from Dead Letters
- 1. "In the Shadows" Released: 3 February 2003; 2. "In My Life" Released: 1 August 2003; 3. "First Day of My Life" Released: 15 October 2003; 4. "Funeral Song" Released: 25 April 2004; 5. "Guilty" Released: 4 August 2004

Alternative cover
- UK/US cover

Professional ratings
Review scores
Source	Rating
AllMusic	3/5 stars
Melodic	3.5/5 stars

Dead Letters is the fifth album by Finnish band the Rasmus released in 2003. It was released later in 2004 in the US, UK and Australia. Their previous album, Into, had seen some success in some parts of Europe, particularly Scandinavia and Germany, but Dead Letters signified the band's major break-through. The album received 8 Gold and 6 Platinum music certification awards. Lead single "In the Shadows" received 6 gold and 2 platinum awards, selling over 1 million copies and breaking the record for performance royalties received abroad on a Finnish composition (overtaking the works of Jean Sibelius).

== Making of the album ==
The Rasmus recorded Dead Letters in June–December 2002 at Nord Studios in Sweden, reuniting with Mikael Nord Andersen and Martin Hansen, who had produced their Scandinavian hit album Into.

Lead singer Lauri Ylönen explained the title of the album on the band's website. "Each song is a letter to somebody. It could be an apology, confession or cry out for help". The back side of the album booklet reads:

A dead letter is a letter that has never been delivered because the person to whom it was written cannot be found, and it also cannot be returned to the person who wrote it.

== Critical reception ==
Allmusic rated the album 3 stars out of 5. The review said "This Finnish group is more than capable of presenting dark and moody yet very finely tuned rock songs" reminiscent of alternative rock bands Savage Garden, Nine Inch Nails and the Gathering. It rated the best tracks as "Time to Burn", "Not Like the Other Girls" and the re-recording of "F-F-F-Falling", of which the original version appears on the Into album, and was added to the UK release as a bonus track.

== Commercial performance ==
Dead Letters was released in Europe in early 2003. It reached the top of the album charts in Germany, Austria and Switzerland as well as in Finland, where it stayed in the Top 20 Album chart for over a year. The album was released in the UK in 2004, being the first record to be released in the country by the band, and was one of the Top 50 best-selling albums of 2004. Commercial success in Europe led to the release of the album in other parts of the world. Dead Letters and lead single "In the Shadows" both reached the Top 50 of the Australian ARIA charts in 2004, as well as the Top 20 of the American Billboard Heatseeker charts.

The Rasmus received numerous music awards across Europe, winning the 'Best Nordic Act' category in the 2003 MTV Europe Music Awards, and five Finnish EMMA awards for Best Group, Best Album, Best Video (In My Life), Best Artist and Export in 2004. The band also won an ECHO award for best international newcomer and were awarded "Best International Artist" at the 2004 MTV Russia Music Awards. "In The Shadows" was on the nominations list for the 2004 Kerrang! Award for Best Single.

== Track listing ==
All tracks are written by The Rasmus.

No.	Title	Length
1.	"First Day of My Life"	3:42
2.	"In the Shadows"	4:20
3.	"Still Standing"	3:27
4.	"In My Life"	4:01
5.	"Time to Burn"	4:32
6.	"Guilty"	3:40
7.	"Not Like the Other Girls"	5:43
8.	"The One I Love"	3:14
9.	"Back in the Picture"	3:41
10.	"Funeral Song"	3:17

UK Bonus Tracks
No.	Title	Length
11.	"F-F-F-Falling"	3:52
12.	"If You Ever"	3:48
13.	"What Ever"	3:11

US Bonus Tracks
No.	Title	Length
11.	"F-F-F-Falling"	3:56
12.	"In the Shadows" (Video)

China/Taiwanese Limited Edition Bonus VCD
No.	Title	Length
11.	"In the Shadows" (Original Version – Video)
12.	"In the Shadows" (European Version – Video)
13.	"In the Shadows" (American Version – Video)
14.	"First Day of My Life" (Video)
15.	"Funeral Song" (Video)
16.	"In My Life" (Video)
17.	"Epk" (Interview)

Dead Letters Finnish Edition
No.	Title	Length
1.	"First Day of My Life" (US Remix)	3:44
2.	"In the Shadows"	4:05
3.	"Still Standing"	3:31
4.	"In My Life"	4:01
5.	"Time to Burn"	4:32
6.	"Guilty" (US Remix)	3:41
7.	"Not Like the Other Girls"	5:43
8.	"The One I Love" (US Remix)	3:15
9.	"Back in the Picture"	3:41
10.	"Funeral Song"	3:17
11.	"F-F-F-Falling" (US Remix)	3:52
12.	"If You Ever"	3:48
13.	"What Ever"	3:11
14.	"Everything You Say"	2:48
15.	"In The Shadows" (Meadows Remix)	4:38
16.	"In The Shadows" (Nordic Version – Video)
17.	"In The Shadows" (Nordic Version (Making of video))
18.	"The Rasmus Computer Stuff" (Screensavers, Desktops, Photo Gallery, Extra Video Material)

Italian Edition Bonus DVD
No.	Title	Length
1.	"First Day of My Life" (US Remix)	3:44
2.	"In the Shadows"	4:05
3.	"Still Standing"	3:31
4.	"In My Life"	4:01
5.	"Time to Burn"	4:32
6.	"Guilty" (US Remix)	3:41
7.	"Not Like the Other Girls"	5:43
8.	"The One I Love" (US Remix)	3:15
9.	"Back in the Picture"	3:41
10.	"Funeral Song"	3:17
11.	"If You Ever"	3:48
12.	"Everything You Say"	2:48
13.	"What Ever"	3:11
14.	"Since You've Been Gone"	3:03
15.	"First Day of My Life" (Acoustic Demo)
16.	"In The Shadows" (Nordic Version – Video)
17.	"In My Life" (Video)
18.	"First Day of My Life" (Video)

European Limited Edition – Bonus CD
No.	Title	Length
1.	"In the Shadows – Video"	03:57
2.	"The Making of the Video "In The Shadows""	13:17
3.	"Making the video screensaver"
4.	"Logo screensaver"
5.	"Desktop wallpapers"
6.	"Photo Gallery"
7.	"Computer stuff"
8.	"Photos taken by Henrik Walse, Nauska and the Rasmus"

== Personnel ==
The Rasmus

- Lauri Ylönen – vocals
- Pauli Rantasalmi – guitar
- Eero Heinonen – bass
- Aki Hakala – drums

Additional musicians

- Rutger Gunnarson – strings
- Ylva Nilsson, Håkan Westlund, and Anna Wallgreen – cellos
- Jörgen Ingeström – additional keyboards

Production and design

- Mikael Nord and Martin Hansen – record producer, mixdown, programming, keyboards, and additional sounds
- George Marino – mastering
- Lars Tengroth – A&R
- Seppo Vesterinen – business management
- Dina Hovsepian – design
- Henrik Walse – logo
- Henrik Walse and Nela Koenig – photos

== B-sides, outtakes and non-album tracks ==
Song	Releases
"What Ever"	B-Side of "In My Life"
"Since You've Been Gone"	B-Side of "First Day of My Life" UK Edition
"Everything You Say"	B-Side of "Funeral Song"
"If You Ever"	B-Side of "Funeral Song"

== Release history ==
A list of countries and the date when the album was released.

Country	Date
Italy	26 November 2003
Spain	5 January 2004
US/UK	22 March 2004
Japan	Early 2004
Taiwan	June 2004

== Music videos ==
- In the Shadows – Finnish "Bandit" version (2003)

Video directed by Finn Andersson for Film Magica Oy in Helsinki, Finland.

- In My Life (2003)

Video directed by Niklas Fronda and Fredrik Löfberg, Baranga Film/Topaz.

- In the Shadows – European "Crow" version (2003)

Video directed by Niklas Fronda & Fredrik Löfberg, Baranga Film in Stockholm, Sweden.

- First Day of My Life (2003)

Video directed by Sven Bollinger and produced by Volker Steinmetz (Erste Liebe Filmproduktion) in Lausitzring, Germany.

- In the Shadows – US/UK "Mirror" version (2004)

Video directed by Philipp Stöltzl in Bucharest, Romania.

- Funeral Song (The Resurrection) (2004)

Video directed by Niklas Fronda and Fredrik Löfberg, Baranga Film in Stockholm, Sweden.

- Guilty (2004)

Video directed by Nathan Cox in Los Angeles.

== See also ==
- Live Letters, a live DVD released in 2004.

== Charts ==
=== Weekly charts ===
Chart (2003–04)	Peak position
Australian Albums (ARIA)	49
Austrian Albums (Ö3 Austria)	1
Belgian Albums (Ultratop Flanders)	25
Belgian Albums (Ultratop Wallonia)	20
Danish Albums (Hitlisten)	32
Dutch Albums (Album Top 100)	29
Finnish Albums (Suomen virallinen lista)	1
French Albums (SNEP)	3
German Albums (Offizielle Top 100)	1
Hungarian Albums (MAHASZ)	3
Irish Albums (IRMA)	28
Italian Albums (FIMI)	22
New Zealand Albums (RMNZ)	16
Scottish Albums (Official Charts)	61
Swedish Albums (Sverigetopplistan)	17
Swiss Albums (Schweizer Hitparade)	1
UK Albums (Official Charts)	10
US Heatseekers Albums (Billboard)	18

=== Year-end charts ===
Chart (2003)	Position
Austrian Albums (Ö3 Austria)	19
German Albums (Offizielle Top 100)	27
Swedish Albums (Sverigetopplistan)	53
Swiss Albums (Schweizer Hitparade)	14

Chart (2004)	Position
Belgian Albums (Ultratop Flanders)	74
Belgian Albums (Ultratop Wallonia)	67
Dutch Albums (Album Top 100)	92
French Albums (SNEP)	82
Swiss Albums (Schweizer Hitparade)	79
UK Albums (OCC)	66

== Certifications and sales ==
Region	Certification	Certified units/sales
Austria (IFPI Austria)	Gold	15,000^{*}
Finland (Musiikkituottajat)	2× Platinum	78,363
Germany (BVMI)	Platinum	200,000^{^}
Hungary (MAHASZ)	Gold	10,000^{^}
Mexico (AMPROFON)	Gold	50,000^{^}
Poland (ZPAV)	Gold	20,000^{*}
Spain (Promusicae)	Gold	50,000^{^}
Sweden (GLF)	Gold	30,000^{^}
Switzerland (IFPI Switzerland)	Platinum	40,000^{^}
United Kingdom (BPI)	Gold	100,000^{^}
Summaries
Europe	—	1,000,000
^{*} Sales figures based on certification alone.^{^} Shipments figures based on certification alone.
