= I Believe in a Thing Called Love =

2003 single by the Darkness

Single by the Darkness

from the album Permission to Land
- B-side: "Makin' Out"; "Physical Sex"; "Out of My Hands"
- Released: 22 September 2003
- Studio: Chapel (Lincolnshire, England)
- Genre: Hard rock; glam metal
- Length: 3:40
- Label: Must... Destroy!!; Atlantic
- Songwriters: Justin Hawkins; Dan Hawkins; Frankie Poullain; Ed Graham
- Producer: Pedro Ferreira

The Darkness singles chronology
| "Growing on Me" (2003) | "I Believe in a Thing Called Love" (2003) | "Christmas Time (Don't Let the Bells End)" (2003) |

"I Believe in a Thing Called Love" is a song by English rock band the Darkness, released as the third single from their debut studio album, Permission to Land. When released as a single in September 2003, it peaked at number two on the UK Singles Chart. The song also charted worldwide, becoming a top-10 hit in Ireland, New Zealand, and Sweden, as well as on the US Billboard Modern Rock Tracks chart.

== Background and release ==
"I Believe in a Thing Called Love" was originally issued as a 3-track EP in August 2002; however, as only a small number of copies were printed, it was ineligible to chart. The EP also included early versions of "Love on the Rocks with No Ice" and "Love Is Only a Feeling". A live version of the song recorded at Knebworth House in Knebworth, Hertfordshire, in 2003 was included as a B-side on the group's Christmas single, "Christmas Time (Don't Let the Bells End)".

== Commercial performance ==
When released as a single in September 2003, "I Believe in a Thing Called Love" peaked at number two on the UK Singles Chart. Sales and streams in the UK have surpassed 600,000 units, allowing it to receive a platinum certification from the British Phonographic Industry (BPI). The single helped the album sell 647,000 copies in the United States as of February 2012. The song became the second highest charting single from a UK band in 2003, finishing behind Lostprophets' single "Last Train Home", released in December of that year.

== Music video ==
The music video for the song was designed to launch the band onto the US market. Directed by Alex Smith, the video pays homage to 1950s-1970s science fiction B-movies, with the band featured on a spaceship (Gorath (1962)), performing in a silver interior spaceship (Starcrash (1978)), and battling a monster giant crab who attacks their spaceship (Attack of the Crab Monsters) (1957)).

== Accolades ==
In March 2005, Q magazine placed "I Believe in a Thing Called Love" at number 47 in its list of the 101 Greatest Guitar Tracks. It was named the 276th best track of the 2000s by Pitchfork. It is also placed 493 on The 500 Greatest Songs Since You Were Born on Blender magazine and was ranked number one for Classic Rock magazine's list of "The Greatest Rock Songs of the Noughties." The song was also named the 94th best hard rock song of all time by VH1. In a 2020 poll, Classic Rock readers awarded the song the "Greatest Song of the Century (so far)."

== Track listings ==
UK CD single

1. "I Believe in a Thing Called Love"
2. "Makin' Out"
3. "Physical Sex"

UK limited-edition 7-inch picture disc

A. "I Believe in a Thing Called Love"
B. "Makin' Out"

Digital EP

1. "I Believe in a Thing Called Love" (single version) – 3:38
2. "Makin' Out" – 3:39
3. "Physical Sex" – 3:33
4. "Out of My Hands" – 3:33

UK DVD single

1. "I Believe in a Thing Called Love" (single version)
2. "Out of My Hands"
3. "I Believe in a Thing Called Love" (video)
4. Video clips

Australian CD single

1. "I Believe in a Thing Called Love" (single version)
2. "Makin' Out"
3. "Physical Sex"
4. "Out of My Hands"
5. "I Believe in a Thing Called Love" (video)

== Credits and personnel ==
Credits are taken from the Permission to Land album booklet.

Studios

- Recorded at Chapel Studios (Lincolnshire, England)
- Additional vocals recorded at Paul Smith Music Studios (London, England)
- Mixed at Roundhouse Recording Studios (London, England)
- Mastered at The Exchange (London, England)

Personnel

- Justin Hawkins – writing, vocals, guitar, synthesizer, piano
- Dan Hawkins – writing, guitar
- Frankie Poullain – writing, bass
- Ed Graham – writing, drums
- Pedro Ferreira – production, mixing, engineering
- Will Bartle – recording assistant
- Nick Taylor – mixing assistant
- Mike Marsh – mastering

== Charts ==
=== Weekly charts ===
| Chart (2003–2004) | Peak position |
|---|---|
| Australia (ARIA) | 40 |
| Belgium (Ultratip Bubbling Under Flanders) | 2 |
| Canada Rock Top 30 (Radio & Records) | 6 |
| Europe (Eurochart Hot 100) | 9 |
| France (SNEP) | 37 |
| Germany (GfK) | 47 |
| Ireland (IRMA) | 5 |
| Netherlands (Dutch Top 40) | 15 |
| Netherlands (Single Top 100) | 12 |
| New Zealand (Recorded Music NZ) | 10 |
| Norway (VG-lista) | 14 |
| Paraguay (Notimex) | 1 |
| Scottish Singles Sales (Official Charts) | 2 |
| Sweden (Sverigetopplistan) | 8 |
| UK Singles (Official Charts) | 2 |
| UK Indie (Official Charts) | 1 |
| UK Rock & Metal (Official Charts) | 1 |
| US Bubbling Under Hot 100 (Billboard) | 19 |
| US Alternative Airplay (Billboard) | 9 |
| US Mainstream Rock (Billboard) | 23 |
| US Pop Airplay (Billboard) | 35 |

=== Year-end charts ===
| Chart (2003) | Position |
|---|---|
| Ireland (IRMA) | 35 |
| UK Singles (OCC) | 33 |

| Chart (2004) | Position |
|---|---|
| New Zealand (RIANZ) | 49 |
| US Modern Rock Tracks (Billboard) | 38 |

== Certifications ==
| Region | Certification | Certified units/sales |
|---|---|---|
| United Kingdom (BPI) | Platinum | 600,000^{‡} |
| United States (RIAA) | Platinum | 1,000,000^{‡} |
^{‡} Sales+streaming figures based on certification alone.

== Release history ==
| Region | Date | Format(s) | Label(s) | Ref(s). |
|---|---|---|---|---|
| United Kingdom | 22 September 2003 | 7-inch vinyl; CD; DVD | Must... Destroy!!; Atlantic | |
| United States | 3 November 2003 | Mainstream rock; active rock; alternative radio | Must... Destroy!!; Atlantic | |
| United States | 2 February 2004 | Contemporary hit radio | Must... Destroy!!; Atlantic | |
| Australia | 22 March 2004 | CD | Must... Destroy!!; Atlantic | |

== Cover versions ==
- Hayseed Dixie on their 2004 album Let There Be Rockgrass.
- Damien Dempsey on the 2003 charity album Even Better Than the Real Thing Vol. 1.
- Shayne Ward as a contestant on The X Factor in 2005.
- Lemar on the 2007 BBC Radio 1 Live Lounge album.
- Artist vs. Poet on the 2010 compilation album Rockin' Romance II.
- Panic! at the Disco in various live shows.
- Johnny Robinson as a contestant on The X Factor in 2011.
- Dylan Everett and Olivia Scriven on Degrassi in 2012.
- Adam Lambert and Chris Colfer on Glee episode "Frenemies" in 2014.
- Scott Bradlee and Postmodern Jukebox released a New Orleans jazz version of the song in 2015, featuring Maiya Sykes.
- Hanson covered the song on their Roots & Rock 'N' Roll EP in 2015.
- Delta Goodrem on her 2016 album Wings of the Wild.
- John Hartrampf on his 2025 EP Something New.

== In popular culture ==
This song was featured as a playable track on the music video games Karaoke Revolution Volume 2, Guitar Hero On Tour: Decades and Dancing Stage Fusion, as source music in an episode of The Bill, and as part of the soundtracks for the films Bridget Jones: The Edge of Reason, Mike and Dave Need Wedding Dates, The Fall Guy, and Novocaine. The song was also featured on the original version of SingStar. It is featured in both Rocksmith and Rock Band 3 as downloadable content. The song was featured in a 2012 commercial during Super Bowl XLVI for the Samsung Galaxy Note. This propelled the song to the number one spot on U.S. iTunes rock chart. The song also appeared in an Apple Music commercial featuring pop singer Taylor Swift in 2016. The song was used as Tye Dillinger's entrance music while he was in Ohio Valley Wrestling.
