= In My Life (The Rasmus song) =

Single by The Rasmus

from the album Dead Letters
- B-side: "What Ever"
- Released: August 1, 2003
- Recorded: 2000–2001 in Stockholm, Sweden
- Genre: Alternative metal
- Length: 4:02
- Label: Playground Music
- Songwriters: Aki Hakala, Eero Heinonen, Pauli Rantasalmi, Lauri Ylönen
- Producers: Mikael Nord; Martin Hansen

The Rasmus singles chronology
"In the Shadows" (2003)	"In My Life" (2003)	"First Day of My Life" (2003)

"In My Life" is a song by the Finnish rock band The Rasmus, originally released on the band's fifth album Dead Letters on March 21, 2003.

The single was released on August 1, 2003, under the record label Playground Music. It was the second single from the album Dead Letters and features the B-side track "What Ever". It reached number two on the Finnish singles chart.

== Single track listing ==
1. "In My Life" - 4:02
2. "What Ever" - 3:11

== Music video ==
There is a music video to the song which was shot on Cuba the same year. It was directed by Niklas Fronda and Fredrik Löfberg, Baranga Film/Topaz. Singer Lauri Ylönen is being pulled across the jungle forest floor where he ends up getting very mucky as he jumps into a big pool of swampy mud. The Rasmus have hyper moments during every chorus as they jump around everywhere. Then Lauri is dragged through a lake where all the mud washes off leaving him soaked.
