= Get Your Hands off My Woman =

2003 single by the Darkness

Single by the Darkness

from the album Permission to Land
- B-side: "The Best of Me"
- Released: 24 February 2003
- Length: 3:18
- Label: Must... Destroy!!
- Songwriters: Justin Hawkins; Dan Hawkins; Frankie Poullain; Ed Graham
- Producer: Pedro Ferriera

The Darkness singles chronology
"Get Your Hands off My Woman" (2003)	"Growing on Me" (2003)

"Get Your Hands off My Woman" is a song by English rock band the Darkness. The song was released in February 2003 as the band's debut single and as the lead single from their debut studio album, Permission to Land. Although the single exceeded expectations, reaching 36 on the UK Singles Chart midweek chart, it would ultimately miss the top 40, debuting at number 43.

"Get Your Hands off My Woman" went on to win a Metal Hammer Golden God award for best single. Credited to all four members of the group, the song supposedly reflected personal experiences of lead vocalist Justin Hawkins. "Get Your Hands off My Woman" became a sing-along favourite at concerts by the Darkness, in part due to its parodic obscenity. The song was covered by Ben Folds on his 2004 EP Super D.

== Track listings ==
- CD single
1. "Get Your Hands off My Woman" – 3:18
2. "The Best of Me" – 3:30
3. "Get Your Hands off My Woman" (clean radio version) – 3:07
- 7-inch vinyl
1. "Get Your Hands off My Woman" – 3:18
2. "The Best of Me" – 3:30

== Charts ==
Chart (2003–2004)	Peak position
Scotland Singles (Official Charts)	44
UK Singles (Official Charts)	43
UK Indie (Official Charts)	4
UK Rock & Metal (Official Charts)	4
UK Singles Downloads (Official Charts) "Get Your Hands off My Woman... Again"	14
