= Growing on Me =

2003 single by the Darkness

Single by the Darkness

from the album Permission to Land
- B-side: "How Dare You Call This Love?"; "Bareback"
- Released: 16 June 2003
- Studio: Chapel (Lincolnshire, England)
- Genre: Rock; bubblegum
- Length: 3:29
- Label: Must... Destroy!!
- Songwriters: Justin Hawkins; Dan Hawkins; Frankie Poullain; Ed Graham
- Producer: Pedro Ferreira

The Darkness singles chronology
"Get Your Hands off My Woman" (2003)	"Growing on Me" (2003)	"I Believe in a Thing Called Love" (2003)

"Growing on Me" is a song by British rock band the Darkness from their 2003 debut album, Permission to Land. It was released as the second single on 16 June 2003, peaking at number 11 on the UK Singles Chart. It also charted at number 42 and 46 in Ireland and Australia, respectively.

== Background ==
Despite rumours surrounding the song's meaning, lead singer Justin Hawkins has refuted suggestions that the lyrics pertain to pubic lice or sexually transmitted infections: "People have said it's about pubic lice, but that's obviously wrong because pubic lice don't grow on you, do they?" Hawkins has also commented on the song's true meaning: "A sweet lady woman that you will never fully fathom or understand, but you love her so much that after a while it doesn't matter."

== Music video ==
The video opens with the spaceship that is seen in later singles being mounted by a Pterodactyl attempting to mate with it, before eventually landing over a large riverbank and dispensing four pods containing each band member as a child. The children all enter a helicopter flying towards a large estate and exit there fully grown. The band then perform the song around the estate, including various moments of humour as Justin Hawkins sings naked from a bathtub or Dan Hawkins fires missiles out of his Les Paul.

== Track listings ==
- UK CD and digital single; Australian CD single
1. "Growing on Me"
2. "How Dare You Call This Love?"
3. "Bareback"
- UK 7-inch single

A. "Growing on Me"
B. "How Dare You Call This Love?"

- UK DVD single
1. "Growing on Me" (video + out-takes)
2. "Growing on Me" (audio)

== Credits and personnel ==
Credits are taken from the Permission to Land album booklet.

Studios

- Recorded at Chapel Studios (Lincolnshire, England)
- Additional vocals recorded at Paul Smith Music Studios (London, England)
- Mixed at Roundhouse Recording Studios (London, England)
- Mastered at The Exchange (London, England)

Personnel

- Justin Hawkins – writing, vocals, guitar, synthesizer, piano
- Dan Hawkins – writing, guitar
- Frankie Poullain – writing, bass
- Ed Graham – writing, drums
- Pedro Ferreira – production, mixing, engineering
- Will Bartle – recording assistant
- Nick Taylor – mixing assistant
- Mike Marsh – mastering

== Charts ==
Chart (2003–2004)	Peak position
Australia (ARIA)	46
Canada Rock Top 30 (Radio & Records)	17
Ireland (IRMA)	42
Scotland Singles (Official Charts)	9
UK Singles (Official Charts)	11
UK Rock & Metal (Official Charts)	3
US Alternative Airplay (Billboard)	31

== Release history ==
Region	Date	Format(s)	Label(s)	Ref.
United Kingdom	16 June 2003	7-inch vinyl; CD; DVD	Must... Destroy!	
Australia	8 December 2003	CD	Must... Destroy!	
United States	19 April 2004	Mainstream rock; active rock; alternative radio	Must... Destroy!; Atlantic	

== In popular culture ==
The song is featured in the soundtrack to the film School of Rock, despite not actually appearing in the motion picture. The film itself contains another song by the Darkness, "Black Shuck". This change is likely due to the strong language in "Black Shuck"; changing the song on the released soundtrack would avoid an advisory sticker on the release and allow members of the target audience—namely children—to widely purchase the album. It was also featured in the 2004 film Going the Distance.
