= Elliott Gilbert =

Fictional character from the Fox series Glee

- Adam Lambert as Elliot "Starchild" Gilbert in Glee.
- First appearance: "A Katy or a Gaga" (2013)
- Last appearance: "New New York" (2014)
- Portrayed by: Adam Lambert

In-universe information
- Alias: "Starchild"
- Occupation: Student

Elliott "Starchild" Gilbert is a recurring character in the musical comedy TV series Glee during its fifth season. Elliott is portrayed by actor and musician Adam Lambert. Elliott's main storylines have seen him share scenes with character Kurt Hummel (Chris Colfer) as he is part of Kurt's band. Other storylines saw Elliott being involved with Santana Lopez (Naya Rivera) and Rachel Berry (Lea Michele) during their feud. Elliott's performance of Lady Gaga's "Marry the Night" was well received by critics.

== Storylines ==
Elliott is introduced when he enters NYADA to audition for Kurt's band. Eliott is using a stage name and Kurt was making a mock of it when Elliott explains it is a homage to Ziggy Stardust. Elliott performs "Marry the Night" while Dani (Demi Lovato) backs him up on the guitar. Kurt turns Elliott down because of the way he was dressed. Later Elliott visits Kurt in the diner he works in with his look all toned down and Kurt agrees to have Elliot in the band, pleasing Santana and Dani. Later at band rehearsals Elliott performs "Roar" with Kurt, Rachel, Santana and Dani. Elliott appears again in Puppet Master, where he isn't very fond of Kurt's idea about performing in a local bar called Callbacks that is popular with NYADA students. Santana backs Elliott up on his insecurities of performing there but Kurt tells his dream and Elliott can be seen in the dream sequence. When Elliott and the band do appear at Callbacks only one person attends. Later, Kurt comes to Elliott and the band and informs them that their next gig is at a more popular place and then puppets arrive for the band from Blaine Anderson (Darren Criss).

In the new year, Elliott is invited over by Kurt because Kurt feels that Elliott is going to take over the band. Elliott takes Kurt guitar shopping and they sing "I Believe in a Thing Called Love" together. Elliott reassures Kurt that he isn't going to steal the band away from him and they then take a selfie. During Santana and Rachel's feud, Rachel moves into Elliott's apartment and he helps her practice her music and performs Barracuda with her. Later Santana and Rachel both drag Elliott up to the stage in the diner to perform a song called Gloria for a customer. Elliott, Dani and Kurt decide to disband the first band and start a trio band up without Rachel and Santana. Weeks later, Elliot appears and helps Kurt look for music for the band. Elliott tells Kurt that he and Blaine may need some space. They perform "Rockstar" together. Blaine confronts Elliott about trying to steal Kurt away but Elliott denies it.

== Casting ==
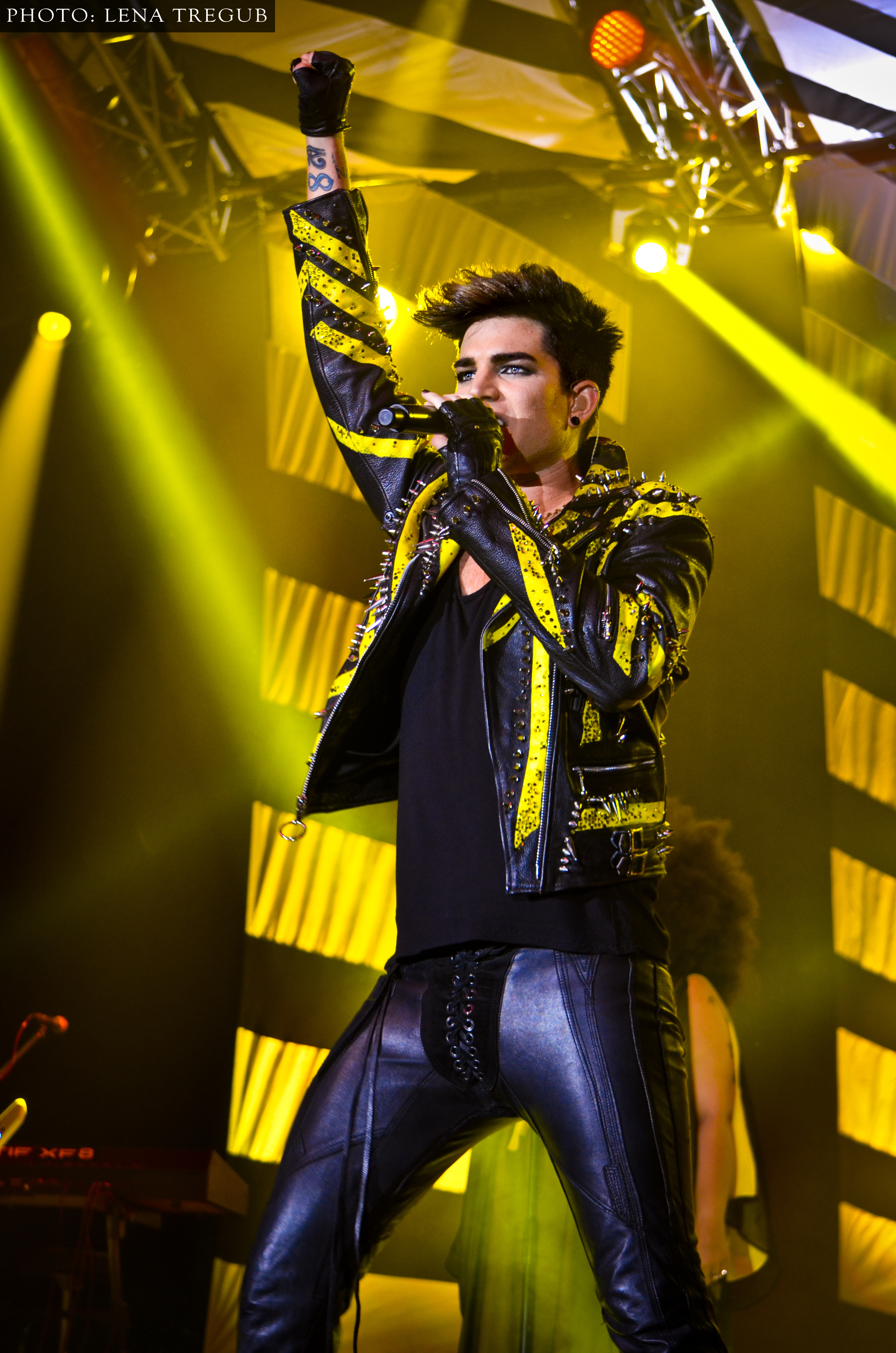
Adam Lambert (pictured) portrays Elliott "Starchild" Gilbert.

On 10 July 2013, it was announced that Lambert was going to appear on Glee. Showrunner Ryan Murphy claimed to be "thrilled" to be announcing Lambert's casting. Lambert stated in an interview "I had such a blast filming the show, and loved getting back into acting and working with such great people," he says. "I'm so excited for everyone to see it!"

== Reception ==
John Walker for MTV wrote, "Oh my god, Glamberts, sorry we're late -- had to duck out of the hospital before the doctors came back. Oh, wait, you wanna know why we were being treated? Ummm, only because we suffered a flawlessness-induced cardiac arrest to the supremest degree after watching Adam Lambert SLAY his rendition of Lady Gaga's "Marry The Night" on Thursday night's episode of "Glee." Sh-duhhhh, did we really have to spell that one out?" Walker went on to write "His 4-minute performance on "A Katy Or A Gaga" as the character Starchild was literally just, like, one shocker after another." Rae Votta of Billboard wrote "Despite being a pretty straightforward interpretation, his "Marry The Night" trumps the other Gaga number of the episode, but this is also Adam Lambert and he could cover Gaga in his sleep." about Lambert's character performing Marry the Night. In a list comprised by Los Angeles Times, Adam Lambert is listed as one of their memorable guest stars. The writer wrote "The "American Idol" alum had a five-episode arc during Season 5 as Elliott "Starchild" Gilbert, an NYU student who auditioned for Kurt Hummel's (Chris Colfer) cover band." In The Celebrity Cafe's top 10 Glee guest stars Lambert placed at 7 where the author wrote "If you never watched Glee during the Lambert days, definitely try to because not only does he have the singing chops, but he glams up his outfits like no other and he gives the scruffy look a whole new image which is worth five "woofs.""
