= Permission to Land =

Studio album by the Darkness
- Released: 7 July 2003
- Recorded: 2002−2003
- Studios: Chapel (South Thoresby, Lincolnshire), Paul Smith Music (London)
- Genres: Hard rock, glam rock
- Length: 38:09
- Label: Atlantic
- Producer: Pedro Ferreira

The Darkness chronology
I Believe in a Thing Called Love (2002)	Permission to Land (2003)	One Way Ticket to Hell... and Back (2005)

Singles from Permission to Land
- 1. "Get Your Hands off My Woman" Released: 24 February 2003; 2. "Growing on Me" Released: 16 June 2003; 3. "I Believe in a Thing Called Love" Released: 22 September 2003; 4. "Christmas Time" Released: 15 December 2003; 5. "Love is Only a Feeling" Released: 22 March 2004

Permission to Land is the debut studio album by the British glam rock band the Darkness, released on 7 July 2003 in the UK and 16 September 2003 in the US. The album topped the UK Albums Chart and reached number thirty-six on the American Billboard 200 chart. Five singles were released from Permission to Land: "Get Your Hands off My Woman", "Growing on Me", "I Believe in a Thing Called Love", "Christmas Time (Don't Let the Bells End)" (which only appears on the German Christmas edition), and "Love Is Only a Feeling". "I Believe in a Thing Called Love" was the most successful, reaching number two on the UK Singles Chart.

== History ==
The band was renowned for their live shows from very early on, and such was the popularity of the band, they had a Carling Homecoming gig booked for the London Astoria before they had even signed a record deal. Joe Taylor, Aled Jones and Paul Scaife at The Tip Sheet, a weekly magazine and CD insert for UK music industry insiders, first heard about the band through a post on The Tip Sheet message board, and featured "Love Is Only a Feeling" in January 2002. Record of the Day featured the song again around the time of SXSW in March 2003. "Friday Night" was to be featured next, but they were told the band was saving it for an album.

According to A&R man Nick Raphael in an interview with HitQuarters, there was no initial clamour to sign the band: "There couldn't have been less of a buzz, and only two record labels showed any interest in them." He believes the reason for lack of interest was that "The business as a whole thought they were uncool. In fact, people were saying that they were a joke and that they weren't real." As part of Sony Music UK, Raphael had attempted to sign them but the band instead opted to go with Atlantic Records.

Permission to Land went straight up to number two on the UK Albums Chart upon its release on 7 July 2003, before going to number one and staying there for four weeks, eventually going on to sell over 1.4 million copies in the UK alone.

In October 2023, a deluxe edition named "Permission to Land… Again" was released to celebrate the 20th anniversary of the album. This edition includes B-sides, unreleased demos, and live tracks.

== Recording ==
The band took inspiration for some of their work from the local north Suffolk area surrounding their home town, Lowestoft, including "Black Shuck", based on the legend of a dog which supposedly haunts the church of the nearby village of Blythburgh. "Stuck in a Rut" also mentions a set of roads known as the "Barnby Bends", and the "Acle Straight", both of which are prominent routes between Lowestoft and Beccles and Norwich and Great Yarmouth respectively. The band recorded an interview for MTV Japan, which discusses the inspiration behind these songs, as well as featuring self-filmed footage of their home town. This features on a bonus DVD included with the Japanese deluxe edition of the album.

== Critical reception ==
Professional ratings
Aggregate scores
Source	Rating
Metacritic	79/100
Review scores
Source	Rating
AllMusic	4/5 stars
Blender	4/5 stars
Entertainment Weekly	D
The Guardian	4/5 stars
Mojo	4/5 stars
NME	7/10
Pitchfork	8.4/10
Q	3/5 stars
Rolling Stone	3/5 stars
Uncut	4/5 stars

The album received widespread acclaim by critics. At Metacritic, which assigns a normalised rating out of 100 to reviews from mainstream critics, the album earned an average score of 79, based on 19 reviews.

"Permission to Land will never be the album that The Darkness think it is," decided Classic Rock, "but, taken in the spirit that it is offered, it's certainly more fun than Use Your Illusion." In July 2019, Decibel Magazine inducted Permission to Land into their Hall of Fame, stating that the album "that came to define hard rock in the early aughts sounds nothing like anything else that was released in 2003 – or the previous decade, for that matter".

== Awards and accolades ==
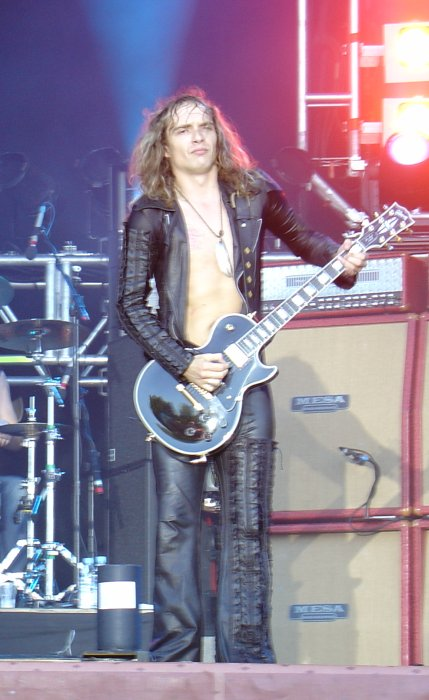
Justin Hawkins at the Ankkarock festival in Finland

The success of this album led to heavy touring for the band, including European portions of Metallica's Summer Sanitarium Tour 2003. They then went on to headline the Carling Festival in 2004. The band won three BRIT Awards in 2004 in response to the album, Best Group, Best Rock Group and Best Album. They also won two Kerrang! awards in 2004 for Best Live Act and Best British Band. The third single from the album, "I Believe in a Thing Called Love", was a substantial hit in the UK as was their tilt at the Christmas 2003 number 1, "Christmas Time (Don't Let the Bells End)", which only just fell short, both singles reaching No.2 in 2003.

In addition to its chart success, Permission to Land also provided the Darkness with two high-profile music awards; Best Rock Album at the 2003 Kerrang! Awards and Best British Album at the 2004 BRIT Awards (at which they also won the awards for Best British Group and Best British Rock Act). Permission to Land was voted 49th in the 50 Greatest Albums of the 21st Century in Kerrang!. Permission to Land was later referenced in the song "Whichever Way You Wanna Give It" by lead singer Justin Hawkins' other band Hot Leg. In 2005, the album was ranked number 356 in Rock Hard magazine's book The 500 Greatest Rock & Metal Albums of All Time. The album was also included in the book 1001 Albums You Must Hear Before You Die. In 2016, Metal Hammer ranked Permission to Land sixty-third in their list of the 100 Greatest Albums of the 21st Century, calling it 'one of the greatest debut albums of all time'.

== Track listing ==
All tracks are written by Justin Hawkins, Dan Hawkins, Frankie Poullain and Ed Graham.

Standard edition
No.	Title	Length
1.	"Black Shuck"	3:20
2.	"Get Your Hands off My Woman"	2:46
3.	"Growing on Me"	3:29
4.	"I Believe in a Thing Called Love"	3:36
5.	"Love Is Only a Feeling"	4:19
6.	"Givin' Up"	3:34
7.	"Stuck in a Rut"	3:17
8.	"Friday Night"	2:56
9.	"Love on the Rocks with No Ice"	5:56
10.	"Holding My Own"	4:56

European Christmas edition bonus track
No.	Title	Length
11.	"Christmas Time (Don't Let the Bells End)"	3:42

Japanese deluxe edition bonus tracks
No.	Title	Length
11.	"The Best of Me"	3:31
12.	"Makin' Out"	3:42

Japanese deluxe edition bonus DVD
No.	Title	Length
1.	"History of the Darkness" (Documentary)	20:00
2.	"Get Your Hands Off My Woman" (Live at the Astoria)	4:34
3.	"I Believe in a Thing Called Love" (Live at Knebworth)	3:52

B-sides
No.	Title	Appearance(s)	Length
1.	"The Best of Me"	B-side to "Get Your Hands off My Woman"	3:31
2.	"How Dare You Call This Love?"	B-side to "Growing on Me"	3:53
3.	"Bareback"	B-side to "Growing on Me"	3:07
4.	"Makin' Out"	B-side to "I Believe in a Thing Called Love"	3:42
5.	"Physical Sex"	B-side to "I Believe in a Thing Called Love"	3:34
6.	"Out of My Hands"	B-side to "I Believe in a Thing Called Love"	3:34
7.	"I Love You 5 Times"	B-side to "Christmas Time (Don't Let the Bells End)"	3:43
8.	"Planning Permission"	B-side to "Love Is Only a Feeling"	2:30
9.	"Curse of the Tollund Man"	B-side to "Love Is Only a Feeling"	3:09
10.	"I Had a Dream"	unreleased outtake	2:53
11.	"I Need You"	unreleased outtake	3:57

== Personnel ==
- Justin Hawkins – vocals, guitars, synthesiser, piano
- Dan Hawkins – guitars
- Frankie Poullain – bass guitar
- Ed Graham – drums

=== Additional ===
- Pedro Ferreira – production, mixing, engineering
- Mike Marsh – mastering
- Will Bartle – recording assistance
- Nick Taylor – mixing assistance
- Bruce Band – artwork
- Patrick Ford – photography

== Charts ==
=== Weekly charts ===
2003–2004 weekly chart performance for Permission to Land
Chart (2003–2004)	Peak position
Australian Albums (ARIA)	17
Austrian Albums (Ö3 Austria)	40
Belgian Albums (Ultratop Flanders)	43
Canadian Albums (Billboard)	10
Danish Albums (Hitlisten)	21
Dutch Albums (Album Top 100)	30
Finnish Albums (Suomen virallinen lista)	17
French Albums (SNEP)	62
German Albums (Offizielle Top 100)	19
Irish Albums (IRMA)	2
Italian Albums (FIMI)	16
New Zealand Albums (RMNZ)	5
Norwegian Albums (VG-lista)	13
Scottish Albums (Official Charts)	1
Swedish Albums (Sverigetopplistan)	8
Swiss Albums (Schweizer Hitparade)	59
UK Albums (Official Charts)	1
US Billboard 200	36

2023 weekly chart performance for Permission to Land
Chart (2023)	Peak position
Hungarian Physical Albums (MAHASZ)	13

=== Year-end charts ===
2003 year-end chart performance for Permission to Land
Chart (2003)	Position
Swedish Albums (Sverigetopplistan)	62
UK Albums (OCC)	6

2004 year-end chart performance for Permission to Land
Chart (2004)	Position
Australian Albums (ARIA)	55
New Zealand Albums (RMNZ)	15
Swedish Albums (Sverigetopplistan)	64
UK Albums (OCC)	56
US Billboard 200	129

== Certifications ==
Certifications and sales for Permission to Land
Region	Certification	Certified units/sales
Australia (ARIA)	Platinum	70,000^{^}
Canada (Music Canada)	Platinum	100,000^{^}
Denmark (IFPI Danmark)	Gold	20,000^{^}
New Zealand (RMNZ)	Platinum	15,000^{^}
Sweden (GLF)	Gold	30,000^{^}
United Kingdom (BPI)	4× Platinum	1,404,909
United States (RIAA)	Gold	710,000
Summaries
Europe (IFPI)	Platinum	1,000,000^{*}
^{*} Sales figures based on certification alone.^{^} Shipments figures based on certification alone.
