= Love Is Only a Feeling =

2004 single by the Darkness

Single by the Darkness

from the album Permission to Land
- B-side: "Planning Permission"; "Curse of the Tollund Man"
- Released: 22 March 2004
- Studio: Chapel (Lincolnshire, England)
- Genre: Rock
- Length: 4:20
- Label: Must... Destroy!!; Atlantic
- Songwriters: Justin Hawkins; Dan Hawkins; Frankie Poullain; Ed Graham
- Producer: Pedro Ferreira

The Darkness singles chronology
"Christmas Time (Don't Let the Bells End)" (2003)	"Love Is Only a Feeling" (2004)	"One Way Ticket" (2005)

"Love Is Only a Feeling" is a song by British rock band the Darkness, released as the fifth and final single from their 2003 debut studio album, Permission to Land. The power ballad peaked at number five on the UK Singles Chart.

== Music video ==
The music video for the song was filmed at locations around the Blue Mountains in Australia, including a flat rock mesa that has been known as Lincoln's Rock in Wentworth Falls since 2013; the Devils Coachhouse in the Jenolan Caves; and Walls Lookout, off Bells Line of Road.

== Track listings ==
- UK and Australian CD single
1. "Love is Only a Feeling"
2. "Planning Permission"
3. "Curse of the Tollund Man"
- UK 7-inch single

A. "Love is Only a Feeling"
B. "Planning Permission"

- UK DVD single
1. "Love is Only a Feeling" (video)
2. "Behind the Scenes" (video)
3. "Get Your Hands Off My Woman" (live at the Astoria video)

== Credits and personnel ==
Credits are taken from the Permission to Land album booklet.

Studios

- Recorded at Chapel Studios (Lincolnshire, England)
- Additional vocals recorded at Paul Smith Music Studios (London, England)
- Mixed at Roundhouse Recording Studios (London, England)
- Mastered at The Exchange (London, England)

Personnel

- Justin Hawkins – writing, vocals, guitar, synthesizer, piano
- Dan Hawkins – writing, guitar
- Frankie Poullain – writing, bass
- Ed Graham – writing, drums
- Pedro Ferreira – production, mixing, engineering
- Will Bartle – recording assistant
- Nick Taylor – mixing assistant
- Mike Marsh – mastering

== Charts ==
Chart (2004)	Peak position
Australia (ARIA)	35
Germany (GfK)	95
Ireland (IRMA)	10
Netherlands (Single Top 100)	92
New Zealand (Recorded Music NZ)	22
Scottish Singles Sales (Official Charts)	5
Sweden (Sverigetopplistan)	55
UK Singles (Official Charts)	5
UK Indie (Official Charts)	1
UK Rock & Metal (Official Charts)	1

== Certifications ==
Region	Certification	Certified units/sales
United Kingdom (BPI)	Silver	200,000^{‡}
^{‡} Sales+streaming figures based on certification alone.

== Release history ==
Region	Date	Format(s)	Label(s)	Ref.
United Kingdom	22 March 2004	7-inch vinyl; CD; DVD	Must... Destroy!!; Atlantic	
Australia	12 July 2004	CD	Must... Destroy!!; Atlantic	
