= Guilty (The Rasmus song) =

Single by The Rasmus

from the album Dead Letters
- B-side: "Guilty" (US Remix); "First Day of My Life" (live); "Guilty" (US Radio Edit; UK only); "Play Dead" (UK only)
- Released: 4 August 2004
- Recorded: June – December 2002
- Studio: Stockholm, Sweden
- Genre: Alternative rock
- Length: 3:46
- Label: Playground Music
- Songwriter(s): Aki Hakala, Eero Heinonen, Pauli Rantasalmi, Lauri Ylönen
- Producer(s): Mikael Nord and Martin Hansen

The Rasmus singles chronology
| "Funeral Song" (2003) | "Guilty" (2004) | "No Fear" (2005) |

"Guilty" is a song by Finnish alternative rock band The Rasmus, originally released on the band's fifth album Dead Letters on March 21, 2003.

The single was released on 4 August 2004 by the record label Playground Music. It was the last single from the album Dead Letters and also features the track "First Day of My Life" (live). The UK version features "Guilty" (US radio edit), "Play Dead" and the video of "Guilty".

== Content ==
The band have said that this song is about how they have neglected their family and friends because of the demanding and time-consuming nature of their job.

== Music video ==
The music video for "Guilty" was shot in Los Angeles in 2004. In the video, The Rasmus are performing in a darkened room, with a photographer taking numerous pictures of different people and the band. There is a problem in the photographs' development, and they turn into representations of the people's anguish, fear and pain.

== Track listing ==
CD-single

1. "Guilty" (US remix)
2. "First Day of My Life" (live)

UK edition

1. "Guilty" (US radio edit)
2. "Play Dead"
3. "Used to Feel Before"

UK Enhanced CD

1. "Guilty" (US Radio Edit)
2. "Play Dead"
3. "Used to Feel Before"
4. "Multimedia track:Guilty" (Video)

Enhanced CD (album version)

1. "Guilty" (album version)
2. "First Day of My Life" (live radio session)
3. "In the Shadows" (live radio session)
4. "Guilty" (video)

== Charts ==
Chart performance for "Guilty"
| Chart (2005) | Peak position |
|---|---|
| Australia (ARIA) | 55 |
| Austria (Ö3 Austria Top 40) | 32 |
| Belgium (Ultratip Bubbling Under Flanders) | 17 |
| Belgium (Ultratip Bubbling Under Wallonia) | 7 |
| Finland (Suomen virallinen lista) | 2 |
| Germany (GfK) | 20 |
| Italy (FIMI) | 39 |
| Netherlands (Single Top 100) | 58 |
| Switzerland (Schweizer Hitparade) | 43 |
| UK Singles (OCC) | 15 |
| UK Rock & Metal (OCC) | 1 |
