= First Day of My Life (The Rasmus song) =

Single by The Rasmus

from the album Dead Letters
- B-side: "Since You've Been Gone" (UK only)
- Released: 15 October 2003 (Europe); 1 November 2004 (UK)
- Recorded: June–December 2002 in Stockholm, Sweden
- Genre: Alternative rock, alternative metal
- Length: 3:44
- Label: Playground Music (Europe); Island Records (UK)
- Songwriter(s): Aki Hakala, Eero Heinonen, Pauli Rantasalmi, Lauri Ylönen
- Producer(s): Mikael Nord; Martin Hansen

The Rasmus singles chronology
| "In My Life" (2003) | "First Day of My Life" (2003) | "Funeral Song" (2004) |

"First Day of My Life" is a song by the Finnish alternative rock band The Rasmus, originally released on the band's fifth album Dead Letters on 21 March 2003. It became one of numerous hit singles from the album, with the highest position being No. 4 in Finland.

The single was released on 15 October 2003 by the record label Playground Music. The single (which was the third from Dead Letters) features the music video of the song. UK edition also includes "Guilty" (live) and the b-side "Since You've Been Gone".

== Lyrical meaning ==
Singer Lauri Ylönen explains the song as follows:

Flashing up from our German tour. We were watching a movie in the back of the tour bus, and in the movie there was a sentence "through the darkness". I took my guitar and made a chorus immediately. The song is about the band, being on tour and dreaming.

== Single track listing ==
Original version (2003)

1. "First Day of My Life" - 3:44
2. The "First Day of My Life" music video as MPEG

UK edition (2004)

1. "First Day of My Life" - 3:44
2. "Guilty" [live]
3. "Since You've Been Gone"
4. The "First Day of My Life" music video

== Music video ==
The band in the music video for "First Day Of My Life"

The music video for "First Day of My Life" was shot on a speedway in Germany the same year. It was directed by Sven Bollinger and produced by Volker Steinmetz (Erste Liebe Filmproduktion) in Lausitzring.

== Charts ==
=== Weekly charts ===
| Chart (2003–04) | Peak position |
|---|---|
| Austria (Ö3 Austria Top 40) | 9 |
| Belgium (Ultratop 50 Flanders) | 31 |
| Belgium (Ultratop 50 Wallonia) | 28 |
| Finland (Suomen virallinen lista) | 4 |
| Germany (GfK) | 6 |
| Hungary (Rádiós Top 40) | 40 |
| Hungary (Single Top 40) | 5 |
| Italy (FIMI) | 12 |
| Netherlands (Dutch Top 40) | 13 |
| Netherlands (Single Top 100) | 28 |
| Poland (Polish Airplay Chart) | 4 |
| Sweden (Sverigetopplistan) | 31 |
| Switzerland (Schweizer Hitparade) | 20 |
| UK Singles (OCC) | 50 |

=== Year-end charts ===
| Chart (2004) | Position |
|---|---|
| Netherlands (Dutch Top 40) | 91 |
