= List of downloadable English songs for the SingStar series =

SingStar is a series of music video games developed by London Studio and published by Sony Computer Entertainment for the PlayStation 2 and PlayStation 3 video game consoles. Gameplay in the SingStar games requires players to sing along to music in order to score points, using SingStar-specific USB microphones which ship with the game. Over 70 different SingStar SKUs have been released worldwide, featuring over 1,500 disc-based songs. There are usually 10–20 new English single tracks and one song pack on the SingStore every fortnight with usually double the amount of additions at Christmas.

Editions of SingStar for the PlayStation 3 support downloadable content in the form of additional songs for the game. Almost all songs are able to be purchased individually, although some songs can only be purchased in themed packs of five. Over 1600 songs have been made available as downloadable content, including a total of 569 English-language songs. Songs are made available worldwide where possible, although regional differences exist due to licensing and censorship restrictions. The success of the SingStore exceeded the expectations of the game's developers, with over 2.2 million songs purchased from the online service as of August 2008.

== English songs ==
Year	Artist	Title	Australia	UK	United States
1978	10cc	"Dreadlock Holiday"	Yes	Yes	Yes
1975	10cc	"I'm Not in Love"	Yes	Yes	Yes
2006	1990s	"You're Supposed to Be My Friend"	Yes	Yes	Yes
1992	2 Unlimited	"No Limit"	Yes	Yes	Yes
2003	3 Doors Down	"Here Without You"	Yes	Yes	Yes
2000	3 Doors Down	"Kryptonite"	Yes	Yes	Yes
2005	3 Doors Down	"Let Me Go"	Yes	Yes	No
2003	3 Doors Down	"When I'm Gone"	Yes	Yes	No
2005	Thirty Seconds to Mars	"A Beautiful Lie"	Yes	Yes	Yes
2005	Thirty Seconds to Mars	"From Yesterday"	Yes	Yes	Yes
2009	Thirty Seconds to Mars	"Kings and Queens"	Yes	Yes	Yes
2005	Thirty Seconds to Mars	"The Kill"	Yes	Yes	Yes
1995	3T	"Anything"	Yes	Yes	Yes
1996	3T	"I Need You"	Yes	Yes	Yes
1993	4 Non Blondes	"What's Up?"	Yes	Yes	Yes
2004	The 411	"Dumb"	Yes	Yes	Yes
2004	4–4–2	"Come On England"	Yes	Yes	Yes
1989	The 4 Of Us	"Mary"	Yes	Yes	Yes
2007	AaRON	"U-Turn (Lili)"	Yes	Yes	Yes
1976	ABBA	"Dancing Queen"	Yes	Yes	Yes
1979	ABBA	"Does Your Mother Know"	Yes	Yes	Yes
1976	ABBA	"Fernando"	Yes	Yes	Yes
1979	ABBA	"Gimme! Gimme! Gimme! (A Man After Midnight)"	Yes	Yes	Yes
1975	ABBA	"Mamma Mia"	Yes	Yes	Yes
1982	ABC	"The Look of Love"	Yes	Yes	Yes
1982	ABC	"Poison Arrow"	Yes	Yes	Yes
1994	Ace of Base	"Don't Turn Around"	Yes	Yes	Yes
1998	Ace of Base	"Life Is a Flower"	Yes	Yes	Yes
2008	Adele	"Cold Shoulder"	Yes	Yes	Yes
2008	Adele	"Chasing Pavements"	Yes	Yes	Yes
2007	Adele	"Hometown Glory"	Yes	Yes	Yes
2011	Adele	"Rolling In The Deep"	Yes	Yes	Yes
2011	Adele	"Set Fire To The Rain"	Yes	Yes	Yes
2011	Adele	"Someone Like You"	Yes	Yes	Yes
1982	Adam Ant	"Goody Two Shoes"	Yes	Yes	Yes
1980	Adam & The Ants	"Ant Music"	Yes	Yes	Yes
1981	Adam & The Ants	"Kings Of The Wild Frontier"	Yes	Yes	Yes
1981	Adam & The Ants	"Prince Charming"	Yes	Yes	Yes
1980	Adam & The Ants	"Stand And Deliver"	Yes	Yes	Yes
1993	Aerosmith	"Cryin'"	Yes	Yes	Yes
1987	Aerosmith	"Dude (Looks Like a Lady)"	Yes	Yes	Yes
2005	Agnes Carlsson	"Right Here, Right Now"	Yes	Yes	Yes
1996	Alanis Morissette	"Ironic"	Yes	Yes	Yes
1995	Alanis Morissette	"You Oughta Know"	Yes	Yes	Yes
2003	Alcazar	"Not a Sinner, Nor a Saint"	Yes	Yes	Yes
1985	Aled Jones	"Walking In The Air"		Yes	
2010	Alexandra Burke feat. Pitbull	"All Night Long"	Yes	Yes	Yes
2009	Alexandra Burke feat. Flo Rida	"Bad Boys"	Yes	Yes	Yes
2008	Alexandra Burke	"Hallelujah"	Yes	Yes	Yes
2006	Aleksander With	"A Little Too Perfect"	Yes	Yes	Yes
2006	Aleksander With	"The Other Side"	Yes	Yes	Yes
2009	Alexander Rybak	"Fairytale"	Yes	Yes	Yes
2005	Alexia	"Da Grande"	Unknown	Unknown	Yes
1973	Alice Cooper	"No More Mr. Nice Guy"	Yes	Yes	Yes
1989	Alice Cooper	"Poison"	Yes	Yes	Yes
1972	Alice Cooper	"School's Out"	Yes	Yes	Yes
1984	Alison Moyet	"All Cried Out"	Yes	Yes	Yes
1997	All Saints	"Never Ever"	Yes	Yes	Yes
1999	All Saints	"Pure Shores"	Yes	Yes	Yes
2010	Aloe Blacc	"I Need A Dollar"	Yes	Yes	Yes
2008	Alphabeat	"Boyfriend"	Yes	Yes	Yes
2007	Alphabeat	"Fantastic 6"	No	No	No
2007	Alphabeat	"Fascination"	No	No	Yes
2012	AlunaGeorge	"You Know You Like It"	Yes	Yes	Yes
2008	Amanda Jenssen	"Amarula Tree"	Yes	Yes	Yes
1966	Al Martino	"Spanish Eyes"	Yes	Yes	Yes
2007	Amy Winehouse	"Back To Black"	Yes	Yes	Yes
2007	Amy Winehouse	"Love Is a Losing Game"	Yes	Yes	Yes
2006	Amy Winehouse	"Rehab"	Yes	Yes	No
2007	Amy Winehouse	"Tears Dry on Their Own"	Yes	Yes	No
2007	Amy Winehouse	"You Know I'm No Good"	Yes	Yes	No
1999	Anastacia	"I'm Outta Love"	Yes	Yes	Yes
2000	Anastacia	"Not That Kind"	Yes	Yes	Yes
2005	Anberlin	"A Day Late"	Yes	Yes	Yes
2005	Anberlin	"Paperthin Hymn"	Yes	Yes	Yes
2001	Andreas Johnson	"Glorious"	Yes	Yes	Yes
2001	Andreas Johnson	"Sing For Me"	Yes	Yes	Yes
2008	Ane Brun	"True Colors"	Yes	Yes	Yes
2008	Angélico	"Bailarina"	Unknown	Unknown	Yes
1980	The Angels	"No Secrets"	Yes	Yes	Yes
2005	Anna Abreu	"End of Love"	Yes	Yes	Yes
2010	Anna Bergendahl	"This Is My Life"	Yes	Yes	Yes
2005	Annie	"Heartbeat"	Yes	Yes	Yes
2004	Anouk	"Girl"	Yes	Yes	Yes
2007	Anouk	"Good God"	No	Yes	No
1997	Anouk	"Nobody's Wife"	Yes	Yes	Yes
1997	Anouk	"Sacrifice"	Yes	Yes	Yes
2008	Apocalyptica	"I Don't Care"	Yes	Yes	Yes
2008	Aqua	"Back to the 80's"	Yes	Yes	Yes
1997	Aqua	"Barbie Girl"	Yes	Yes	Yes
2000	Aqua	"Cartoon Heroes"	Yes	Yes	Yes
2013	Arctic Monkeys	"Do I Wanna Know?"	Yes	Yes	Yes
1987	Aretha Franklin & George Michael	"I Knew You Were Waiting (For Me)"	Yes	Yes	Yes
1968	Aretha Franklin	"I Say a Little Prayer"	Yes	Yes	Yes
2007	Ari Koivunen	"Hear My Call"	Yes	Yes	Yes
1992	Arrested Development	"Tennessee"	Yes	Yes	Yes
1996	Ash	"Girl from Mars"	Yes	Yes	Yes
1996	Ash	"Goldfinger"	Yes	Yes	Yes
1996	Ash	"Kung Fu"	Yes	Yes	Yes
1996	Ash	"Oh Yeah"	Yes	Yes	Yes
2001	Ash	"Shining Light"	Yes	Yes	Yes
1988	Ashford & Simpson	"Solid"	Yes	Yes	Yes
2006	Ashlee Simpson	"Invisible"	Yes	Yes	Yes
1988	Aslan	"This Is"	Yes	Yes	Yes
1986	Aswad	"Don't Turn Around"		Yes	Yes
2001	Atomic Kitten	"Eternal Flame"	Yes	Yes	Yes
2002	Atomic Kitten	"The Tide Is High (Get the Feeling)"	Yes	Yes	Yes
1993	Atomic Swing	"Stone Me Into The Groove"	Yes	Yes	Yes
2006	Augie March	"One Crowded Hour"	Yes	Yes	Yes
2006	The Automatic	"Monster"	Yes	Yes	Yes
2013	Avicii	"Hey Brother"	Yes	Yes	Yes
2006	Avenged Sevenfold	"Bat Country"	Yes	Yes	No
2002	Avril Lavigne	"Complicated"	Yes	Yes	Yes
2007	Avril Lavigne	"Girlfriend"	Yes	Yes	Yes
2008	Avril Lavigne	"Hot"	Yes	Yes	Yes
2003	Avril Lavigne	"I'm with You"	Yes	Yes	Yes
2005	Avril Lavigne	"My Happy Ending"	Yes	Yes	Yes
2002	Avril Lavigne	"Sk8er Boi"	Yes	Yes	Yes
2011	Avril Lavigne	"Smile"	Yes	Yes	Yes
2011	Avril Lavigne	"What the Hell"	Yes	Yes	Yes
1996	Azúcar Moreno	"Sólo Se Vive Una Vez"	Unknown	Unknown	Yes
2009	A-ha	"Foot of the Mountain"	Yes	Yes	Yes
1985	A-ha	"Hunting High and Low"	Yes	Yes	Yes
1986	A-ha	"I've Been Losing You"	Yes	Yes	Yes
2009	A-ha	"Shadowside"	Yes	Yes	Yes
1985	A-ha	"Take On Me"	Yes	Yes	Yes
1985	A-ha	"The Sun Always Shines on T.V."	Yes	Yes	Yes
2012	B.o.B	"So Good"	Yes	Yes	Yes
1995	Babylon Zoo	"Spaceman"	Yes	Yes	Yes
1977	Baccara	"Yes Sir, I Can Boogie"	Yes	Yes	Yes
1997	Backstreet Boys	"Everybody (Backstreet's Back)"	Yes	Yes	Yes
1999	Backstreet Boys	"I Want It That Way"	Yes	Yes	Yes
1996	Babybird	"You're Gorgeous"	Yes	Yes	Yes
1998	Babyface	"Sleigh Ride"	Yes	Yes	Yes
2007	Babyshambles	"Delivery"	Yes	Yes	No
2000	Badly Drawn Boy	"Once Around The Block"	Yes	Yes	Yes
2002	Badly Drawn Boy	"You Were Right"	Yes	Yes	Yes
2001	Baha Men	"Who Let The Dogs Out?"	Yes	Yes	Yes
1985	Baltimora	"Tarzan Boy"	Yes	Yes	Yes
1984	Bananarama	"Cruel Summer"	Yes	Yes	Yes
1987	Bananarama	"Love in the First Degree"	Yes	Yes	Yes
1984	Bananarama	"Robert De Niro's Waiting"	Yes	Yes	Yes
1986	Bananarama	"Venus"	Yes	Yes	Yes
1989	The Bangles	"Eternal Flame"	Yes	Yes	Yes
1986	The Bangles	"Walk Like An Egyptian"	Yes	Yes	Yes
1974	Barry White	"You're the First, the Last, My Everything"	Yes	Yes	Yes
2001	Basement Jaxx	"Romeo"	Yes	Yes	No
1983	The Beach Boys	"Auld Lang Syne"	Yes	Yes	Yes
1965	The Beach Boys	"Barbara Ann"	Yes	Yes	Yes
1964	The Beach Boys	"Fun Fun Fun"	Yes	Yes	Yes
1966	The Beach Boys	"God Only Knows"	Yes	Yes	Yes
1966	The Beach Boys	"Good Vibrations"	Yes	Yes	Yes
1966	The Beach Boys	"Sloop John B"	Yes	Yes	Yes
1963	The Beach Boys	"Surfin' U.S.A."	Yes	Yes	Yes
1990	The Beautiful South	"A Little Time"	Yes	Yes	No
2005	The Bees	"Chicken Payback"	Yes	Yes	Yes
1987	Belinda Carlisle	"Heaven Is a Place on Earth"	Yes	Yes	No
2014	Ben Howard	"I Forget Where We Were"	Yes	Yes	Yes
2012	Ben Howard	"Only Love"	Yes	Yes	Yes
1997	Beth Orton	"She Cries Your Name"	Yes	Yes	Yes
1999	Beth Orton	"Stolen Car"	Yes	Yes	No
2002	Beverley Knight	"Shoulda Woulda Coulda"	Yes	Yes	Yes
1997	Bic Runga	"Sway"	Yes	Yes	Yes
2013	Biffy Clyro	"Black Chandelier"	Yes	Yes	Yes
2008	Biffy Clyro	"Mountains"	Yes	Yes	Yes
2000	BigBang	"Girl in Oslo"	Yes	Yes	Yes
2007	BigBang	"I Don't Wanna"	Yes	Yes	Yes
2002	Big Brovaz	"Nu Flow"	Yes	Yes	Yes
2006	Big Fat Snake	"Bonsoir Madame"	Yes	Yes	Yes
1971	Bill Withers	"Ain't No Sunshine"	Yes	Yes	Yes
1972	Bill Withers	"Lean on Me"	Yes	Yes	Yes
1980	Billy Joel	"It's Still Rock and Roll to Me"	Yes	Yes	Yes
1989	Billy Joel	"I Go to Extremes"	Yes	Yes	Yes
1977	Billy Joel	"Just the Way You Are"	Yes	Yes	Yes
1973	Billy Joel	"Piano Man"	Yes	Yes	Yes
1993	Billy Joel	"The River of Dreams"	Yes	Yes	Yes
1983	Billy Joel	"Tell Her About It"	Yes	Yes	Yes
1987	Billy Joel	"Uptown Girl"	Yes	Yes	Yes
1989	Billy Joel	"We Didn't Start the Fire"	Yes	Yes	Yes
1984	Billy Ocean	"Caribbean Queen (No More Love on the Run)"	Yes	Yes	Yes
1985	Billy Ocean	"When the Going Gets Tough, the Tough Get Going"	Yes	Yes	Yes
1992	Billy Ray Cyrus	"Achy Breaky Heart"	Yes	Yes	No
1950	Bing Crosby	"Auld Lang Syne"		Yes	Yes
1984	Bizarre Inc	"I'm Gonna Get You"	Yes	Yes	Yes
1985	Black	"Wonderful Life"	Yes	Yes	Yes
2003	The Black Eyed Peas	"Shut Up"	Yes	Yes	Yes
1970	Black Sabbath	"Paranoid"	Yes	Yes	No
1996	Blacknuss Allstars	"Last Night a DJ Saved My Life"	Yes	Yes	Yes
2008	Blind	"Break Away"	Yes	Yes	Yes
1992	Blind Melon	"No Rain"	Yes	Yes	Yes
2005	Bloc Party	"Banquet"	Yes	Yes	No
2004	Bloc Party	"Helicopter"	Yes	Yes	No
2009	Bloc Party	"One More Chance"	Yes	Yes	No
2007	Bloc Party	"The Prayer"	Yes	Yes	No
1980	Blondie	"Atomic"	Yes	Yes	Yes
1980	Blondie	"Call Me"	Yes	Yes	Yes
1978	Blondie	"Hanging on the Telephone"	Yes	Yes	Yes
1978	Blondie	"Heart of Glass"	Yes	Yes	Yes
1979	Blondie	"One Way or Another"	Yes	Yes	Yes
1981	Blondie	"Rapture"	Yes	Yes	Yes
1980	Blondie	"The Tide Is High"	Yes	Yes	Yes
1986	The Blow Monkeys	"Digging Your Scene"	Yes	Yes	Yes
1987	The Blow Monkeys	"It Doesn't Have To Be This Way"	Yes	Yes	Yes
2001	Blu Cantrell	"Hit 'Em Up Style (Oops!)"	Yes	Yes	Yes
2002	Blue	"One Love"	Yes	Yes	Yes
1976	Blue Öyster Cult	"(Don't Fear) The Reaper"	Yes	Yes	Yes
1997	Blur	"Beetlebum"	Yes	Yes	No
1996	Blur	"Charmless Man"	Yes	Yes	Yes
1999	Blur	"Coffee & TV"	Yes	Yes	Yes
1994	Blur	"End of a Century"	Yes	Yes	Yes
1993	Blur	"For Tomorrow"	Yes	Yes	Yes
1994	Blur	"Girls & Boys"	Yes	Yes	No
2003	Blur	"Good Song"	Yes	Yes	Yes
1994	Blur	"Parklife"	Yes	Yes	Yes
1990	Blur	"She's So High"	Yes	Yes	Yes
1996	Blur	"Song 2"	Yes	Yes	Yes
1999	Blur	"Tender"	Yes	Yes	Yes
1991	Blur	"There's No Other Way"	Yes	Yes	Yes
1994	Blur	"This Is a Low"	Yes	Yes	Yes
1994	Blur	"To the End"	Yes	Yes	Yes
1995	Blur	"The Universal"	Yes	Yes	Yes
2007	Bob Sinclar	"Sound of Freedom"	Yes	Yes	Yes
1969	Bobbie Gentry	"I'll Never Fall In Love Again"	Yes	Yes	Yes
2013	Bonnie Tyler	"Believe in Me"	Yes	Yes	Yes
1983	Bonnie Tyler	"Total Eclipse of the Heart"	Yes	Yes	Yes
2006	Booty Luv	"Shine"	Yes	Yes	Yes
1977	Boney M.	"Ma Baker"	Yes	Yes	Yes
1976	Boney M.	"Daddy Cool"	Yes	Yes	Yes
1978	Boney M.	"Rivers of Babylon"	Yes	Yes	Yes
1995	The Boo Radleys	"Wake Up Boo!"	Yes	Yes	Yes
2005	Boss AC	"Hip-hop (sou eu e és tu)"	Unknown	Unknown	Yes
1976	Boston	"More than a Feeling"	Yes	Yes	Yes
2008	Börni	"Scream My Name"	Yes	Yes	Yes
1988	Boy Meets Girl	"Waiting for a Star to Fall"	Yes	Yes	Yes
2007	Boys Like Girls	Hero/Heroine	Yes	Yes	Yes
2007	Boys Like Girls	"The Great Escape"	Yes	Yes	Yes
1994	Boyz II Men	"I'll Make Love to You"	Yes	Yes	No
1991	Boyz II Men	"Motownphilly"	Yes	Yes	No
1995	Boyzone	"Father and Son"	Yes	Yes	No
1994	Boyzone	"Love Me For A Reason"	Yes	Yes	No
1996	Boyzone	"Words"	Yes	Yes	No
2007	Brad Paisley	"Online"	Yes	Yes	Yes
2008	Bratz	"Friends Are Everything"	Yes	Yes	Yes
2007	The Bravery	"Believe"	Yes	Yes	No
1992	Brian May	"Driven by You"	Yes	Yes	Yes
1999	Britney Spears	"Baby One More Time"	Yes	Yes	Yes
1999	Britney Spears	"Born to Make You Happy"	Yes	Yes	Yes
1999	Britney Spears	"From the Bottom of My Broken Heart"	Yes	Yes	Yes
2002	Britney Spears	"I'm Not a Girl, Not Yet a Woman"	Yes	Yes	Yes
2002	Britney Spears	"I Love Rock N Roll"	Yes	Yes	Yes
2002	Britney Spears	"Overprotected"	Yes	Yes	Yes
2000	Britney Spears	"Oops!... I Did It Again"	Yes	Yes	Yes
1999	Britney Spears	"Sometimes"	Yes	Yes	Yes
2000	Britney Spears	"Stronger"	Yes	Yes	Yes
1999	Britney Spears	"(You Drive Me) Crazy"	Yes	Yes	Yes
1992	Brooks and Dunn	"Boot Scootin' Boogie"	Yes	Yes	Yes
1988	Bros	"I Owe You Nothing"	Yes	Yes	Yes
1987	Bros	"When Will I Be Famous?"	Yes	Yes	Yes
1988	Brother Beyond	"The Harder I Try"	Yes	Yes	Yes
1976	Bryan Ferry	"Let's Stick Together"	Yes	Yes	Yes
2005	Bryan Rice	"No Promises"	Yes	Yes	Yes
1981	Bucks Fizz	"Making Your Mind Up"	Yes	Yes	Yes
1979	Buggles	"Video Killed the Radio Star"	Yes	Yes	Yes
2007	Burhan G	"Who Is He?"	Yes	Yes	Yes
2002	Busted	"What I Go to School For"	Yes	Yes	No
2006	The Butterfly Effect	"Gone"	Yes	Yes	Yes
2006	The Butterfly Effect	"A Slow Descent"	Yes	Yes	No
1978	Buzzcocks	"Ever Fallen in Love (With Someone You Shouldn't've)"	Yes	Yes	Yes
2006	Caesars	"Jerk It Out"	Yes	Yes	Yes
2001	The Calling	"Wherever You Will Go"	Yes	Yes	Yes
2007	Calvin Harris	"Acceptable in the 80s"	Yes	Yes	Yes
2011	Calvin Harris	"Feel So Close"	Yes	Yes	Yes
2007	Calvin Harris	"The Girls"	Yes	Yes	Yes
2009	Calvin Harris	"I'm Not Alone"	Yes	Yes	Yes
2009	Calvin Harris	"Ready For The Weekend"	Unknown	Yes	Yes
2014	Calvin Harris	"Summer"	Yes	Yes	Yes
1986	Cameo	"Word Up!"	Yes	Yes	No
1999	The Cardigans	"Erase/Rewind"	Unknown	Yes	No
1996	The Cardigans	"Lovefool"	Yes	Yes	No
1998	The Cardigans	"My Favourite Game"	Yes	Yes	No
1974	Carl Douglas	"Kung Fu Fighting"	Yes	Yes	No
2010	Carpark North	"Just Human"	Yes	Yes	Yes
2006	Carrie Underwood	"Before He Cheats"	Unknown	Unknown	Yes
2006	Cartel	"Honestly"	Yes	Yes	Yes
2007	Cartel	"Lose It"	Yes	Yes	Yes
2006	Cat Power	"Lived in Bars"	Yes	Yes	No
1998	Catatonia	"Road Rage"	Yes	Yes	Yes
2004	Cathy Davey	"Clean and Neat"	Yes	Yes	Yes
2012	Carly Rae Jepsen	"Call Me Maybe"	Yes	Yes	Yes
1996	Céline Dion	"All By Myself"	Yes	Yes	Yes
2002	Céline Dion	"A New Day Has Come"	Yes	Yes	No
1998	Céline Dion	"Christmas Eve"	Yes	Yes	Yes
1992	Céline Dion	"Love Can Move Mountains"	Yes	Yes	Yes
1998	Celine Dion	"O Holy Night"		Yes	
1994	Céline Dion	"Think Twice"	Yes	Yes	Yes
1977	Charlene	"I've Never Been to Me"	Yes	Yes	No
1992	Charles & Eddie	"Would I Lie To You"	Yes	Yes	Yes
2013	Charlie Brown	"On My Way"	Yes	Yes	Yes
2008	Charlotte Perrelli	"Hero"	Yes	Yes	No
1980	Chas & Dave	"Rabbit"	Yes	Yes	Yes
1979	Cheap Trick	"I Want You To Want Me"	Yes	Yes	Yes
1982	Cheap Trick	"If You Want My Love"	Yes	Yes	Yes
1988	Cheap Trick	"The Flame"	Yes	Yes	Yes
2005	The Chemical Brothers	"Galvanize"	Yes	Yes	Yes
1989	Cher	"If I Could Turn Back Time"	Yes	Yes	No
2011	Cher Lloyd	"Swagger Jagger"	Yes	Yes	Yes
2012	Cher Lloyd	"Want U Back"	Yes	Yes	Yes
2011	Cher Lloyd feat. Mike Posner	"With Ur Love"	Yes	Yes	Yes
2009	Cheryl Cole	"Fight For This Love"	Yes	Yes	Yes
1979	Chic	"Good Times"	Yes	Yes	Yes
2009	Chipmunk	"Look For Me"	Yes	Yes	Yes
1982	Chris De Burgh	"Don't Pay the Ferryman"	Yes	Yes	Yes
1983	Chris De Burgh	"High on Emotion"	Yes	Yes	Yes
1986	Chris De Burgh	"The Lady in Red"	Yes	Yes	Yes
2011	Chris Brown feat. Benny Benassi	"Beautiful People"	Yes	Yes	Yes
2008	Chris Brown	"Forever"	Yes	Yes	Yes
2009	Chris Brown feat. Lil Wayne and Swizz Beatz	"I Can Transform Ya"	Yes	Yes	Yes
2007	Chris Brown feat. T-Pain	"Kiss Kiss"	Yes	Yes	Yes
2007	Chris Brown	"Wall to Wall"	Yes	Yes	Yes
2007	Chris Brown	"With You"	Yes	Yes	Yes
1988	The Christians	"Harvest for the World"	Yes	Yes	No
2010	Chip feat. Chris Brown	"Champion"	Yes	Yes	Yes
1997	Chumbawamba	"Tubthumping"	Yes	Yes	Yes
2004	Ciara	"1, 2 Step"	Yes	Yes	Yes
1984	The Clash	"Should I Stay or Should I Go"	Yes	Yes	Yes
1989	Cliff Richard	"I Just Don't Have the Heart"	Yes	Yes	Yes
1988	Cliff Richard	"Mistletoe and Wine"	Yes	Yes	Yes
1983	Cliff Richard	"Ocean Deep"	Yes	Yes	Yes
1990	Cliff Richard	"Saviour's Day"		Yes	
1959	Cliff Richard and The Drifters	"Living Doll"	Yes	Yes	No
2004	Coheed and Cambria	"A Favor House Atlantic"	Yes	Yes	Yes
2010	Coldplay	"Christmas Lights"	Yes	Yes	Yes
2002	Coldplay	"Clocks"	Yes	Yes	Yes
2005	Coldplay	"Don't Panic"	Yes	Yes	Yes
2011	Coldplay	"Every Teardrop Is a Waterfall"	Yes	Yes	Yes
2005	Coldplay	"Fix You"	Yes	Yes	Yes
2006	Coldplay	"The Hardest Part"	Yes	Yes	Yes
2002	Coldplay	"In My Place"	Yes	Yes	Yes
2009	Coldplay	"Life in Technicolor II"	Yes	Yes	Yes
2008	Coldplay	"Lost!"	Yes	Yes	Yes
2011	Coldplay	"Paradise"	Yes	Yes	Yes
2002	Coldplay	"The Scientist"	Yes	Yes	Yes
2000	Coldplay	"Shiver"	Yes	Yes	Yes
2005	Coldplay	"Speed of Sound"	Yes	Yes	Yes
2008	Coldplay	"Strawberry Swing"	Yes	Yes	Yes
2006	Coldplay	"Talk"	Yes	Yes	Yes
2000	Coldplay	"Trouble"	Yes	Yes	Yes
2008	Coldplay	"Violet Hill"	Yes	Yes	Yes
2008	Coldplay	"Viva la Vida"	Yes	Yes	Yes
2000	Coldplay	"Yellow"	Yes	Yes	Yes
1998	Collapsed Lung	"Eat my Goal"	Yes	Yes	Yes
1977	The Commodores	"Easy"	Yes	Yes	No
1978	The Commodores	"Three Times a Lady"	Yes	Yes	No
1987	The Communards	"Never Can Say Goodbye"	Yes	Yes	Yes
2006	The Concretes	"On The Radio"	Yes	Yes	Yes
2003	The Coral	"Bill McCai"	Yes	Yes	Yes
2002	The Coral	"Dreaming of You"	Yes	Yes	Yes
2005	The Coral	"In The Morning"	Yes	Yes	Yes
2003	The Coral	"Pass It On"	Yes	Yes	Yes
2007	Corinne Bailey Rae	"I'd Like To"	Yes	Yes	Yes
2006	Corinne Bailey Rae	"Like a Star"	Yes	Yes	Yes
2005	Corinne Bailey Rae	"Put Your Records On"	Yes	Yes	Yes
1997	Cornershop	"Brimful of Asha"	Unknown	Unknown	Yes
2000	The Corrs	"Breathless"	Yes	Yes	Yes
1995	The Corrs	"Runaway"	Yes	Yes	Yes
1999	The Corrs	"Radio"	Yes	Yes	Yes
1998	The Corrs	"What Can I Do?"	Yes	Yes	Yes
1986	Corynne Charby	"Boule de flipper"	Unknown	Unknown	Yes
2006	Cosmo4	"Adios Amigos"	Yes	Yes	Yes
2006	Cosmo4	"Peek-A-Boo"	Yes	Yes	Yes
1991	Crash Test Dummies	"Mmm Mmm Mmm Mmm"	Yes	Yes	Yes
1990	The Creeps	"Ooh I Like It!"	Yes	Yes	Yes
1988	Crowded House	"Better Be Home Soon"	Yes	Yes	Yes
1993	Crowded House	"Distant Sun"	Yes	Yes	Yes
1986	Crowded House	"Don't Dream It's Over"	Yes	Yes	Yes
1991	Crowded House	"Fall at Your Feet"	Yes	Yes	Yes
1992	Crowded House	"Four Seasons In One Day"	Yes	Yes	Yes
1996	Crowded House	"Instinct"	Yes	Yes	No
1992	Crowded House	"It's Only Natural"	Yes	Yes	Yes
1994	Crowded House	"Locked Out"	Yes	Yes	Yes
1986	Crowded House	"Mean To Me"	Yes	Yes	Yes
1996	Crowded House	"Not the Girl You Think You Are"	Yes	Yes	No
1992	Crowded House	"Weather with You"	Yes	Yes	Yes
2008	Crystal Castles	"Courtship Dating"	Yes	Yes	No
1982	Culture Club	"Do You Really Want to Hurt Me"	Yes	Yes	Yes
1983	Culture Club	"Karma Chameleon"	Yes	Yes	Yes
1986	The Cure	"Boys Don't Cry"	Yes	Yes	No
1992	The Cure	"Friday I'm in Love"	Yes	Yes	No
1987	The Cure	"Just Like Heaven"	Yes	Yes	No
1990	The Cure	"Pictures of You"	Yes	Yes	No
1986	Cutting Crew	"(I Just) Died in Your Arms"	Yes	Yes	Yes
1983	Cyndi Lauper	"Girls Just Want to Have Fun"	Yes	Yes	Yes
1984	Cyndi Lauper	"She Bop"	Yes	Yes	Yes
1984	Cyndi Lauper	"Time After Time"	Yes	Yes	Yes
1986	Cyndi Lauper	"True Colors"	Yes	Yes	Yes
1991	D-A-D	"Bad Craziness"	No	Yes	Yes
1991	D-A-D	"Laugh N a Half"	No	Yes	Yes
1971	Daddy Cool	"Eagle Rock"	Yes	Yes	Yes
2007	Damien Leith	"22 Steps"	Yes	Yes	Yes
2006	Damien Leith	"Night of My Life"	Yes	Yes	Unknown
2001	The Dandy Warhols	"Bohemian Like You"	Yes	Yes	Yes
2003	The Dandy Warhols	"We Used to Be Friends"	Yes	Yes	Yes
2004	Daniel Lindström	"Coming True"	Yes	Yes	Yes
2005	Daniel Powter	"Bad Day"	Yes	Yes	Yes
2005	Darin	"Money for Nothing"	Yes	Yes	Yes
2003	The Darkness	"I Believe in a Thing Called Love"	Yes	Yes	Yes
1988	Daryl Braithwaite	"One Summer"	Unknown	Unknown	Yes
2002	Dashboard Confessional	"Screaming Infidelities"	Yes	Yes	Yes
2003	Datarock	"Fa Fa Fa"	Yes	Yes	Yes
2007	Daughtry	"Home"	Yes	Yes	Yes
1988	Dave Dobbyn	"Loyal"	Unknown	Yes	Yes
1986	Dave Dobbyn	"Slice Of Heaven"	Yes	Yes	Yes
2003	David	"Wild at Heart"	No	Yes	Yes
1986	David Bowie	"Absolute Beginners"	Yes	Yes	No
1972	David Bowie	"Changes"	Yes	Yes	No
1977	David Bowie	"Heroes"	Yes	Yes	Yes
1973	David Bowie	"The Jean Genie"	Yes	Yes	Yes
1984	David Bowie	"Let's Dance"	Yes	Yes	Yes
1971	David Bowie	"Life on Mars?"	Yes	Yes	Yes
1974	David Bowie	"Rebel Rebel"	Yes	Yes	Yes
1972	David Bowie	"Starman"	Yes	Yes	Yes
1982	David Essex	"A Winter's Tale"		Yes	
2003	David Fonseca	"The 80s"	Yes	Yes	No
2006	David Hasselhoff	"Jump in My Car"	Yes	Yes	Yes
1985	David Lee Roth	"Just a Gigalo – I Ain't Got Nobody"	Yes	Yes	Yes
1984	Dead or Alive	"You Spin Me Round (Like a Record)"	Yes	Yes	Yes
1995	Deep Blue Something	"Breakfast at Tiffany's"	Yes	Yes	Yes
1971	Deep Purple	"Strange Kind of Woman"	Yes	Yes	No
1996	Deep Purple	"Strange Kind of Woman" (A side Remix '96)	No	No	Yes
2007	Delorentos	"Basis of Everything"	Unknown	Yes	Yes
2007	Delorentos	"Do You Realise"	Unknown	Yes	Yes
2006	Delorentos	"The Rules"	Unknown	Yes	Yes
2002	Delta Goodrem	"Born to Try"	Yes	Yes	Yes
2003	Delta Goodrem	"Innocent Eyes"	Yes	Yes	No
1986	Depeche Mode	"A Question of Lust"	Yes	Yes	No
1990	Depeche Mode	"Enjoy the Silence"	Yes	Yes	No
1983	Depeche Mode	"Everything Counts"	Yes	Yes	Unknown
1993	Depeche Mode	"I Feel You"	Yes	Yes	Unknown
1981	Depeche Mode	"Just Can't Get Enough"	Yes	Yes	No
1987	Depeche Mode	"Never Let Me Down Again"	Yes	Yes	No
1989	Depeche Mode	"Personal Jesus"	Yes	Yes	No
2005	Depeche Mode	"Precious"	Yes	Yes	Unknown
1982	Depeche Mode	"See You"	Yes	Yes	No
1985	Depeche Mode	"Shake the Disease"	Yes	Yes	No
1973	Demis Roussos	"Forever and Ever"	Yes	Yes	No
1968	Desmond Dekker & The Aces	"Israelites"	Yes	Yes	No
1982	Dexy's Midnight Runners	"Come On Eileen"	Yes	Yes	No
2003	Di-rect	"A Good Thing"	Unknown	Yes	Yes
2002	Di-rect	"Adrenaline"	Yes	Yes	Yes
2005	Di-rect	"Cool Without You"	Unknown	Unknown	Yes
2005	Di-rect	"Hungry For Love"	Yes	Yes	Unknown
1964	Diana Ross & The Supremes	"Baby Love"	Yes	Yes	No
1967	Diana Ross & The Supremes and The Temptations	"I Second That Emotion"		Yes	
2001	Dido	"Here with Me"	Yes	Yes	Yes
2003	Dido	"Life for Rent"	Yes	Yes	Yes
2000	Dido	"Thank You"	Yes	Yes	Yes
2003	Dido	"White Flag"	Yes	Yes	Yes
1992	Digable Planets	"Rebirth of Slick (Cool Like Dat)"	Yes	Yes	Yes
2008	Dima Bilan	"Believe"	Yes	Yes	Unknown
1985	Dire Straits	"Brothers in Arms"	Yes	Yes	Yes
1985	Dire Straits	"Money for Nothing"	Yes	Yes	Yes
1978	Dire Straits	"Sultans of Swing"	Yes	Yes	Yes
1985	Dire Straits	"Walk of Life"	Yes	Yes	Yes
1996	The Divine Comedy	"Becoming More Life Alfie"	Unknown	Unknown	Yes
1996	The Divine Comedy	"My Lovely Horse"	Yes	Yes	Yes
1999	The Divine Comedy	"National Express"	Yes	Yes	Yes
1996	The Divine Comedy	"Something for the Weekend"	Yes	Yes	Yes
1981	Divinyls	"Boys in Town"	Yes	Yes	Yes
1990	Divinyls	"I Touch Myself"	Yes	Yes	Yes
2004	Dizzee Rascal	"Dream"	Yes	Yes	Yes
2003	Dizzee Rascal	"Fix Up, Look Sharp"	Yes	Yes	Yes
2007	Dizzee Rascal	"Flex"	Yes	Yes	Yes
2009	Dizzee Rascal feat. Chrome	"Holiday"	Yes	Yes	Unknown
2009	Dizzee Rascal feat. Calvin Harris & Chrome	"Dance Wiv Me"	Yes	Unknown	Yes
2009	Dizzee Rascal/Armand Van Helden	"Bonkers"	Yes	Yes	Yes
2007	DJ Bobo	"Because of You"	Yes	Yes	Yes
2002	DJ Bobo	"Chihuahua 2002"	Yes	Yes	No
2001	DJ Bobo	"Hard to Say I'm Sorry"	Yes	Yes	No
1996	DJ Bobo	"It's My Life"	Yes	Yes	Yes
1994	DJ Bobo	"Let The Dream Come True"	Unknown	Unknown	Yes
2005	DJ Bobo	"Pirates Of Dance"	Yes	Yes	Yes
2007	DJ Bobo	"Vampires Are Alive"	Yes	Yes	Yes
1991	DJ Jazzy Jeff & The Fresh Prince	"Summertime"	Yes	Yes	Yes
2000	DJ Ötzi	"Hey Baby"	Yes	Yes	Unknown
1971	Don McLean	"American Pie"	Yes	Yes	Yes
1972	Don McLean	"Vincent"	Yes	Yes	Yes
2008	Donots	"New Hope for the Dead"	Unknown	Yes	Yes
2005	Donots	"Saccharine Smile"	Unknown	Unknown	Yes
2008	Donots	"Stop The Clocks"	Unknown	Unknown	Yes
1964	Doris Day	"Have Yourself A Merry Little Christmas"		Yes	
1997	Dover	"Serenade"	Yes	Yes	Yes
2005	Doves	"Black and White Town"	Yes	Yes	Yes
1977	Dragon	"April Sun in Cuba"	Yes	Yes	Yes
1992	Dr Alban	"It's My Life"	Yes	Unknown	Yes
2008	Duffy	"Mercy"	Yes	Yes	Yes
2008	Duffy	"Rain on Your Parade"	Unknown	Yes	Unknown
2008	Duffy	"Warwick Avenue"	Yes	Yes	Unknown
2013	Duke Dumont feat. A*M*E	"Need U (100%)"	Yes	Yes	Yes
1981	Duran Duran	"Girls on Film"	Yes	Yes	Yes
1982	Duran Duran	"Hungry Like the Wolf"	Yes	Yes	Yes
1983	Duran Duran	"Is There Something I Should Know?"	Yes	Yes	Yes
1993	Duran Duran	"Ordinary World"	Yes	Yes	Yes
1981	Duran Duran	"Planet Earth"	Yes	Yes	Yes
1983	Duran Duran	"The Reflex"	Yes	Yes	Yes
1982	Duran Duran	"Rio"	Yes	Yes	Yes
1982	Duran Duran	"Save a Prayer"	Yes	Yes	Yes
1983	Duran Duran	"Union of the Snake"	Yes	Yes	Yes
1984	Duran Duran	"The Wild Boys"	Yes	Yes	Yes
1968	Dusty Springfield	"I Close My Eyes And Count To Ten"	Yes	Yes	No
1964	Dusty Springfield	"I Just Don't Know What to Do with Myself"	Yes	Yes	No
1970	Dusty Springfield	"Spooky"	Yes	Yes	No
1969	Dusty Springfield	"Son of a Preacher Man"	Yes	Yes	No
1967	Dusty Springfield	"The Look of Love"	Yes	Yes	No
1966	Dusty Springfield	"You Don't Have to Say You Love Me"	Yes	Yes	No
1979	Earth, Wind & Fire	"Boogie Wonderland"	Yes	Yes	Yes
1979	Earth and Fire	"Weekend"	Yes	Yes	Yes
1994	East 17	"Stay Another Day"	Yes	Yes	Yes
1983	Eddy Grant	"Electric Avenue"	Yes	Yes	No
1988	Eddy Grant	"Gimme Hope Jo'anna"	Yes	Yes	No
1982	Eddy Grant	"I Don't Wanna Dance"	Yes	Yes	No
1983	Eddy Grant	"Living On The Front Line"	Yes	Yes	No
2005	Editors	"Munich"	Yes	Yes	Yes
2009	Editors	"Papillon"	Yes	Yes	Yes
2008	Editors	"Push Your Head Towards the Air"	Yes	Yes	Yes
2008	Editors	"The Racing Rats"	Yes	Yes	Yes
2007	Editors	"Smokers Outside the Hospital Doors"	Yes	Yes	Yes
2010	Edward Sharpe and the Magnetic Zeros	"Home"	Yes	Yes	Yes
1979	Edwin Starr	"H.A.P.P.Y Radio"	Yes	Yes	No
1970	Edwin Starr	"War"	Yes	Yes	No
1996	Eels	"Novocaine For The Soul"	Yes	Yes	No
2008	Elbow	"Grounds for Divorce"	Yes	Yes	Yes
2010	Ellie Goulding	"Guns and Horses"	Yes	Yes	Yes
2010	Ellie Goulding	"Starry Eyed"	Yes	Yes	Yes
2010	Ellie Goulding	"Your Song"	Yes	Yes	Yes
1974	Elton John	"Candle in the Wind"	Yes	Yes	No
1972	Elton John	"Crocodile Rock"	Yes	Yes	No
1985	Elton John	"Nikita"	Yes	Yes	No
1972	Elton John	"Rocket Man (I Think It's Going To Be A Long Long Time)"	Yes	Yes	Yes
1989	Elton John	"Sacrifice"	Yes	Yes	No
1984	Elton John	"Sad Songs (Say So Much)"	Yes	Yes	No
1973	Elton John	"Step Into Christmas"		Yes	
1978	Elton John	"Your Song"	Yes	Yes	No
2006	Elvira Nikolaisen	"Egypt Song"	Yes	Yes	Yes
2006	Elvira Nikolaisen	"Love I Can't Defend"	Yes	Yes	Yes
2006	Elvira Nikolaisen	"Sweet Sweet"	No	Yes	Yes
1969	Elvis Presley	"Suspicious Minds"	Yes	Yes	Yes
1977	Elvis Presley	"Way Down"	Yes	Yes	Yes
2009	Emilíana Torrini	"Jungle Drum"	Yes	Yes	Yes
2008	Empire of the Sun	"Walking on a Dream"	Yes	Yes	Yes
2008	Empire of the Sun	"We Are The People"	Yes	Yes	Yes
2008	Empyr	"New Day"	Yes	Yes	Yes
1996	En Vogue	"Don't Let Go (Love)"	Yes	Yes	Yes
1992	En Vogue	"Free Your Mind"	Yes	Yes	Yes
1993	En Vogue	"My Lovin' (You're Never Gonna Get It)"	Yes	Yes	Yes
2005	End of Fashion	"O Yeah"	Yes	Yes	Yes
1970	England Football Team 70	"Back Home"	Yes	Yes	No
2011	Emeli Sandé	"Heaven"	Yes	Yes	Yes
2012	Emeli Sandé	"Next to Me"	Yes	Yes	Yes
2013	Emmelie de Forest	"Only Teardrops"	Yes	Yes	Yes
2009	Eoghan Quigg	28,000 Friends	Yes	Yes	Yes
1968	The Equals	"Baby Come Back"	Yes	Yes	No
1994	Erasure	"Always"	Yes	Yes	Unknown
1988	Erasure	"Chains Of Love"	Unknown	Yes	Unknown
1985	Erasure	"Heavenly Action"	Yes	Yes	No
1988	Erasure	"A Little Respect"	Yes	Yes	No
1986	Erasure	"Oh l'amour"	Yes	Yes	Unknown
1986	Erasure	"Sometimes"	Yes	Yes	Unknown
1990	Erasure	"Star"	Yes	Yes	No
2006	Erik Faber	"Not Over"	Yes	Yes	Yes
2009	Erik Hassle	"Hurtful"	Yes	Yes	No
2005	Eskobar avec Emma Daumas	"You Got Me"	Yes	Yes	No
1997	Espen Lind	"When Susannah Cries"	Yes	Yes	No
1987	Europe	"Carrie"	Yes	Yes	Yes
1986	Europe	"The Final Countdown"	Yes	Yes	Yes
2003	Evanescence	"Bring Me To Life	Yes	Yes	Yes
2004	Evanescence	"Everybody's Fool	Yes	Yes	Yes
2003	Evanescence	"Going Under"	Yes	Yes	Yes
2007	Evanescence	"Good Enough"	Yes	Yes	Yes
2007	Evanescence	"Lithium"	Yes	Yes	Yes
2003	Evanescence	"My Immortal"	Yes	Yes	Yes
1997	Everclear	"Everything To Everyone"	Yes	Yes	Unknown
1998	Everclear	"I Will Buy You A New Life"	Unknown	Yes	Unknown
1995	Everclear	"Santa Monica"	Yes	Yes	Unknown
2004	Evermore	"It's Too Late"	Yes	Yes	Yes
2011	Example	"Stay Awake"	Yes	Yes	
2010	Example	"Won't Go Quietly"	Yes	Yes	Yes
2009	FACT	"A Fact Of Life"	Yes	Yes	Unknown
1988	Fairground Attraction	"Perfect"	Yes	Yes	Yes
1992	Faith No More	"Easy"	Yes	Yes	Yes
2007	Faker	"This Heart Attack"	Yes	Yes	Yes
1985	Falco	"Rock Me Amadeus"	Yes	Yes	Yes
2006	Fall Out Boy	"Dance, Dance"	Yes	Yes	No
2003	Fall Out Boy	"Grand Theft Autumn/Where Is Your Boy"	Yes	Yes	Unknown
2003	Fall Out Boy	"My Songs Know What You Did in the Dark (Light Em Up)"	Yes	Yes	Unknown
2007	Fall Out Boy	"This Ain't A Scene, It's An Arms Race"	Yes	Yes	Unknown
2007	Fall Out Boy	"Thnks fr th Mmrs"	Yes	Yes	No
2001	Feeder	"Buck Rogers"	Yes	Yes	Yes
2014	Fifth Harmony	"Boss"	Yes	Yes	Yes
1989	Fine Young Cannibals	"She Drives Me Crazy"	Yes	Yes	Yes
1998	Five	"Everybody Get Up"	Yes	Yes	Yes
2000	Five	"Keep on Movin'"	Yes	Yes	Yes
1986	Five Star	"System Addict"	Yes	Yes	Yes
2002	The Flaming Lips	"Do You Realize??"	Yes	Yes	Yes
1999	The Flaming Lips	"Race for the Prize"	Yes	Yes	Yes
2006	The Flaming Lips	"The Yeah Yeah Yeah Song (With All Your Power)"	Yes	Yes	No
1982	A Flock of Seagulls	"I Ran (So Far Away)"	Yes	Yes	Yes
2008	Flo Rida feat. Timbaland	"Elevator"	Yes	Yes	Yes
2005	Foo Fighters	"DOA"	Yes	Yes	Yes
2000	Foo Fighters	"Generator"	Yes	Yes	Yes
2011	Foo Fighters	"These Days"	Yes	Yes	Yes
1995	Fools Garden	"Lemon Tree"	Yes	Yes	Yes
1984	Foreigner	"I Want to Know What Love Is"	Yes	Yes	Yes
1968	The Foundations	"Build Me Up Buttercup"	Yes	Yes	No
2003	Fountains of Wayne	"Stacy's Mom"	Yes	Yes	Yes
1965	The Four Tops	"I Can't Help Myself"	Yes	Yes	No
2005	Franz Ferdinand	"Do You Want To"	Yes	Yes	Yes
2013	Franz Ferdinand	"Right Action"	No	Yes	No
2006	Franz Ferdinand	"Take Me Out"	Yes	Yes	Yes
2008	Franz Ferdinand	"Ulysses"	No	Yes	No
2006	The Fratellis	"Chelsea Dagger"	Yes	Yes	Yes
2005	The Fray	"How to Save a Life"	Yes	Yes	Yes
2005	The Fray	"Over My Head (Cable Car)"	Yes	Yes	Yes
1987	Freddie Mercury & Montserrat Caballé	"Barcelona"	Yes	Yes	Yes
1985	Freddie Mercury	"I Was Born to Love You"	Yes	Yes	Yes
1993	Freddie Mercury	"Living On My Own (1993)"	Yes	Yes	Yes
1985	Freddie Mercury	"Made In Heaven"	Yes	Yes	Yes
1987	Freddie Mercury	"The Great Pretender"	Yes	Yes	Yes
1970	Free	"Alright Now"	Yes	Yes	No
2008	Freemasons	"When You Touch Me"	Yes	Yes	Yes
2007	Friendly Fires	"Paris"	Yes	Yes	Yes
1981	Fun Boy Three	"Our Lips Are Sealed"	Yes	Yes	Unknown
2008	Fun Feat. Janelle Monáe	"We Are Young"	Yes	Yes	Yes
2008	Gabriella Cilmi	"Sweet About Me"	Yes	Yes	Unknown
1998	Garbage	"I Think I'm Paranoid"	Yes	Yes	Yes
1995	Garbage	"Only Happy When It Rains"	Yes	Yes	Yes
1998	Garbage	"Push It"	Yes	Yes	Yes
1996	Garbage	"Stupid Girl"	Yes	Yes	Yes
1999	Garbage	"When I Grow Up"	Yes	Yes	Yes
1985	GANGgajang	"Sounds of Then (This Is Australia)"	Yes	Yes	Yes
1979	Gary Numan	"Cars"	Yes	Yes	Yes
1964	Gene Pitney	"24 Hours from Tulsa"	Yes	Yes	Yes
2014	George Ezra	"Blame It on Me"	Yes	Yes	Yes
2013	George Ezra	"Budapest"	Yes	Yes	Yes
2014	George Ezra	"Cassy O'"	Yes	Yes	Yes
1984	George Michael	"Careless Whisper"	Yes	Yes	Yes
1987	George Michael	"Faith"	Yes	Yes	Yes
1990	George Michael	"Freedom! '90"	Yes	Yes	Yes
1987	George Michael	"I Want Your Sex"	Yes	Yes	Yes
1998	George Michael	"Outside"	Yes	Yes	Yes
1992	George Michael	"Too Funky"	Yes	Yes	Yes
1998	The Gift	"Ok! Do You Want Something Simple?"	Yes	Yes	Yes
2001	The Gift	"Question of Love"	Yes	Yes	Yes
1993	Gin Blossoms	"Hey Jealousy"	Yes	Yes	Yes
2005	Girls Aloud	"Biology"	Yes	Yes	No
2006	Girls Aloud	"I Think We're Alone Now"	Yes	Yes	No
2004	Girls Aloud	"I'll Stand By You"	Yes	Yes	No
2004	Girls Aloud	"Love Machine"	Yes	Yes	No
2004	Girls Aloud	"The Show"	Yes	Yes	No
2006	Girls Aloud	"Something Kinda Ooooh"	Yes	Yes	No
2002	Girls Aloud	"Sound of the Underground"	Yes	Yes	No
2007	Glasvegas	"Daddy's Gone"	Yes	Yes	Yes
2009	Glasvegas	"Flowers & Football Tops"	Yes	Yes	Unknown
1988	Gloria Estefan	"1–2–3"	Yes	Yes	Unknown
1984	Gloria Estefan	"Dr. Beat"	Yes	Yes	Unknown
1987	Gloria Estefan	"Rhythm Is Gonna Get You"	Yes	Yes	Yes
1978	Gloria Gaynor	"I Will Survive"	Yes	Yes	Yes
2002	Gluecifer	"Easy Living"	Yes	Yes	No
1988	The Go-Betweens	"Streets Of Your Town"	Yes	Yes	Yes
1985	Go West	"We Close Our Eyes"	Yes	Yes	Yes
1974	Golden Earring	"Radar Love"	Yes	Yes	Yes
1982	Golden Earring	"Twilight Zone"	Yes	Yes	Unknown
2005	Goldfrapp	"Ooh La La"	Yes	Yes	Yes
2010	Gomo	"Final Stroke"	Yes	Yes	Yes
2002	Good Charlotte	"Girls & Boys"	Yes	Yes	No
2007	Good Charlotte	"I Don't Want To Be In Love (Dance Floor Anthem)"	Yes	Yes	Unknown
2004	Good Charlotte	"I Just Wanna Live"	Yes	Yes	Yes
2002	Good Charlotte	"Lifestyles of the Rich & Famous"	Yes	Yes	Yes
2007	Good Charlotte	"The River"	Yes	Yes	Yes
2001	Gorillaz	"19-2000"	Yes	Yes	Yes
2005	Gorillaz	"Dare"	Yes	Yes	Unknown
2005	Gorillaz	"Dirty Harry"	Yes	Yes	Yes
2005	Gorillaz	"Feel Good Inc."	Yes	Yes	Yes
2009	Gossip	"Heavy Cross"	Yes	Yes	Yes
2007	Gossip	"Listen Up!"	Yes	Yes	Yes
2009	Gossip	"Love Long Distance"	Yes	Yes	Yes
2006	Gossip	"Standing in the Way of Control"	Yes	Yes	Yes
2005	Gotthard	"Lift U Up"	Unknown	Yes	Yes
2006	Graham Coxon	"Standing on My Own Again"	Yes	Yes	Yes
2006	Graham Coxon	"You & I"	Yes	Yes	Yes
2007	Guano Apes	"You Can't Stop Me"	Yes	Yes	Yes
2007	Gwen Stefani	"4 In The Morning"	Yes	Yes	Yes
2005	Gwen Stefani	"Cool"	Yes	Yes	No
2004	Gwen Stefani	"What You Waiting For?"	Yes	Yes	Yes
2012	Handsome Poets	"Sky on Fire"	Yes	Yes	Yes
2007	Hanna Pakarinen	"Leave Me Alone"	Yes	Yes	Yes
1997	Hanson	"MMMBop"	Yes	Yes	Yes
2005	Hard-Fi	"Cash Machine"	Yes	Yes	Yes
2005	Hard-Fi	"Hard to Beat"	Yes	Yes	No
1972	Hawkwind	"Silver Machine"	Yes	Yes	Yes
1983	Heaven 17	"Temptation"	Yes	Yes	Yes
2005	Helena Paparizou	"My Number One"	No	Yes	Yes
2000	HIM	"And Love Said No"	No	Yes	Yes
2007	HIM	"Bleed Well"	Yes	Yes	Yes
1999	HIM	"Join Me in Death"	Yes	Yes	Yes
2006	HIM	"Killing Loneliness"	Yes	Yes	Yes
1999	HIM	"Right Here in My Arms"	Yes	Yes	Yes
2005	HIM	"Wings of a Butterfly"	Yes	Yes	Yes
2006	Hinder	"Lips Of An Angel"	Yes	Yes	No
2000	The Hives	"Hate to Say I Told You So"	Yes	Yes	Yes
2000	The Hives	"Main Offender"	Yes	Yes	Yes
2007	The Hives	"Tick Tick Boom"	Yes	Yes	No
2004	The Hives	"Walk Idiot Walk"	Yes	Yes	No
2008	The Hold Steady	"Stay Positive"	Yes	Yes	Unknown
1998	The Honeyz	"End of the Line"	Yes	Yes	No
2004	Hoobastank	"The Reason"	Yes	Yes	Unknown
2007	The Hoosiers	"Cops and Robbers"	Yes	Yes	Yes
2007	The Hoosiers	"Goodbye Mr A"	Yes	Yes	Yes
2007	The Hoosiers	"Worst Case Scenario"	Yes	Yes	Yes
2006	Hot Chip	"Boy From School"	Yes	Yes	No
2005	Hot Chip	"Over and Over"	Yes	Yes	Yes
2008	Hot Chip	"Ready for the Floor"	Yes	Yes	Yes
1975	Hot Chocolate	"You Sexy Thing"	Yes	Yes	Yes
2006	Hooverphonic	"You Hurt Me"	Yes	Yes	Unknown
1981	The Human League	"Don't You Want Me"	Yes	Yes	Yes
1986	The Human League	"Human"	Yes	Yes	Yes
1983	The Human League	"(Keep Feeling) Fascination"	Yes	Yes	No
1981	The Human League	"Love Action (I Believe in Love)"	Yes	Yes	Yes
2011	Hurts	"Illuminated"	Yes	Yes	No
2010	Hurts	"Stay"	Yes	Yes	No
2006	I'm From Barcelona	"We're From Barcelona"	Yes	Yes	Yes
2008	Ida Maria	"Stella"	Yes	Yes	Yes
2014	Idina Menzel	"Let It Go"	Yes	Yes	Yes
2004	Idlewild	"Love Steals Us from Loneliness"	Yes	Yes	Yes
2000	Idlewild	"You Held the World in Your Arms"	Yes	Yes	Yes
2005	Il Divo	"All By Myself"	Yes	Yes	Yes
2005	Il Divo	"Ave Maria"	Yes	Yes	Yes
2005	Il Divo	"Mama"	Yes	Yes	Yes
2004	Il Divo	"The Power of Love"	Yes	Yes	Yes
2005	Il Divo	"Unbreak My Heart"	Yes	Yes	Yes
1981	Imagination	"Flashback"	Yes	Yes	Yes
2012	Jake Bugg	"Lightning Bolt"	Yes	Yes	Yes
2012	Jake Bugg	"Taste It"	Yes	Yes	Yes
2012	Jake Bugg	"Two Fingers"	Yes	Yes	Yes
1957	Jackie Wilson	"Reet Petite"	Yes	Yes	No
1970	The Jackson 5	"ABC"	Yes	Yes	No
1974	The Jackson 5	"Dancing Machine"	Yes	Yes	No
1970	The Jackson 5	"Frosty the Snowman"	Yes	Yes	No
1969	The Jackson 5	"I Want You Back"	Yes	Yes	Unknown
1970	The Jackson 5	"I'll Be There"	Yes	Yes	No
1970	The Jackson 5	"The Love You Save"	Yes	Yes	No
1971	The Jackson 5	"Mama's Pearl"	Yes	Yes	No
1971	The Jackson 5	"Never Can Say Goodbye"	Yes	Yes	No
1970	The Jackson 5 feat. The Supremes	"Santa Claus Is Comin' to Town"	Yes	Yes	No
1969	The Jackson 5	"Who's Loving You"	Yes	Yes	No
2005	Jakob Sveistrup	"Talking to You"	Yes	Yes	Yes
2006	Jamelia	"Beware of the Dog"	Yes	Yes	Yes
2004	Jamelia	"See It in a Boy's Eyes"	Yes	Yes	Yes
2005	Jamelia	"Stop"	Yes	Yes	Yes
2006	Jamelia	"Superstar"	Yes	Yes	Yes
1989	James	"Sit Down"	Yes	Yes	No
2006	James Dean Bradfield	"That's No Way to Tell a Lie"	Yes	Yes	Yes
2008	James Morrison	"You Make It Real"	Yes	Yes	No
2008	James Morrison feat. Nelly Furtado	"Broken Strings"	Yes	Yes	No
1996	Jamiroquai	"Alright"	Yes	Yes	Yes
1996	Jamiroquai	"Cosmic Girl"	Yes	Yes	Yes
1998	Jamiroquai	"Deeper Underground"	Yes	Yes	Yes
1996	Jamiroquai	"Virtual Insanity"	Yes	Yes	No
1982	Japan	"I Second That Emotion"	Yes	Yes	Yes
2010	Jason DeRulo	"Ridin' Solo"	Yes	Yes	Yes
1989	Jason Donovan	"Too Many Broken Hearts"	Unknown	Yes	Yes
2002	Jasper Steverlinck and Steven and Stijn Kolacny	"Life on Mars?"	Yes	Yes	No
2005	Jehro	"Everything"	Yes	Yes	No
1985	Jennifer Rush	"The Power of Love"	Yes	Yes	Yes
2010	Jessie J	"Do It like a Dude"	Yes	Yes	Yes
2011	Jessie J	"Who's Laughing Now"	Yes	Yes	Yes
2011	Jessie J	"Who You Are"	Yes	Yes	Yes
1990	Jesus Jones	"Right Here, Right Now"	Yes	Yes	Yes
2003	Jet	"Are You Gonna Be My Girl"	Yes	Yes	Yes
2003	Jill Johnson	"Crazy in Love"	Yes	Yes	Yes
1985	Jimmy Barnes	"No Second Prize"	Yes	Yes	Yes
1985	Jimmy Barnes	"Working Class Man"	Yes	Yes	Yes
2009	JLS	"Beat Again"	Yes	Yes	Yes
2009	JLS	"Everybody in Love"	Yes	Yes	Yes
1995	Jodeci	"Freek'N You"	Yes	Yes	No
1990	John Farnham	"Burn For You"	Yes	Yes	Yes
1990	John Farnham	"Chain Reaction"	Yes	Yes	Unknown
1986	John Farnham	"Pressure Down"	Yes	Yes	Unknown
1988	John Farnham	"Two Strong Hearts"	Yes	Yes	Unknown
1986	John Farnham	"You're the Voice"	Yes	Yes	Yes
1971	John Lennon	"Imagine"	Yes	Yes	Yes
1985	John Lennon	"Jealous Guy"	Yes	Yes	Yes
1980	John Lennon	"(Just Like) Starting Over"	Yes	Yes	Yes
1970	John Lennon	"Love"	Yes	Yes	Yes
1973	John Lennon	"Mind Games"	Yes	Yes	Yes
1970	John Lennon	"Mother"	Yes	Yes	Yes
1984	John Lennon	"Nobody Told Me"	Yes	Yes	Yes
1975	John Lennon	"Stand by Me"	Yes	Yes	Yes
1974	John Lennon	"Whatever Gets You thru the Night"	Yes	Yes	Yes
1981	John Lennon	"Woman"	Yes	Yes	Yes
2012	John Newman	"Love Me Again"	Yes	Yes	Yes
1969	Johnny Cash	"A Boy Named Sue"	Yes	Yes	Unknown
1989	Johnny Diesel And The Injectors	"Cry In Shame"	Yes	Yes	Unknown
1980	Jona Lewie	"Stop the Cavalry"	Yes	Yes	Yes
2007	Sharon Jones & The Dap-Kings	"100 Days, 100 Nights"	Yes	Yes	Unknown
2008	Josh Turner	"Another Try"	Yes	Yes	No
1980	Joy Division	"Love Will Tear Us Apart"	Yes	Yes	Yes
1980	Judas Priest	"Breaking The Law"	Yes	Yes	Yes
1990	Judas Priest	"A Touch of Evil"	Yes	Yes	Yes
1982	Judas Priest	"You've Got Another Thing Comin'"	Yes	Yes	Yes
2002	Junior Senior	"Move Your Feet"	Yes	Yes	Unknown
2007	Justice	"D.A.N.C.E."	Yes	Yes	Yes
2005	Kaiser Chiefs	"Everyday I Love You Less and Less"	Yes	Yes	No
2007	Kaiser Chiefs	"Everything Is Average Nowadays"	Yes	Yes	No
2004	Kaiser Chiefs	"I Predict a Riot"	Yes	Yes	No
2008	Kaiser Chiefs	"Never Miss a Beat"	Unknown	Yes	Unknown
2004	Kaiser Chiefs	"Oh My God"	Yes	Yes	No
2007	Kaiser Chiefs	"Ruby"	Yes	Yes	Unknown
1983	Kajagoogoo	"Too Shy"	Yes	Yes	Yes
2004	Kasabian	"Club Foot"	Yes	Yes	Yes
2009	Kasabian	"Fire"	Yes	Yes	Unknown
2004	Kasabian	"L.S.F."	Yes	Yes	Yes
2011	Katy B	"Broken Record"	Yes	Yes	Yes
2011	Katy B	"Easy Please Me"	Yes	Yes	Yes
2010	Katy B feat. Ms. Dynamite	"Lights On"	Yes	Yes	Yes
2011	Katy B	"Louder"	Yes	Yes	Yes
2010	Katy B	"Katy on a Mission"	Yes	Yes	Yes
1980	Kate Bush	"Babooshka"	Yes	Yes	Yes
2011	Kate Nash	"Do-Wah-Doo"	Yes	Yes	Yes
2007	Kate Nash	"Mouthwash"	Yes	Yes	Yes
1985	Katrina and the Waves	"Walking on Sunshine"	Yes	Yes	Yes
2006	Keane	"Crystal Ball"	Yes	Yes	Unknown
2004	Keane	"Everybody's Changing"	Yes	Yes	Unknown
2006	Keane	"Is It Any Wonder?"	Yes	Yes	No
2004	Keane	"Somewhere Only We Know"	Unknown	Yes	Unknown
2005	Kelly Clarkson	"Because of You"	Yes	Yes	Yes
2004	Kelly Clarkson	"Breakaway"	Yes	Yes	Yes
2005	Kelly Clarkson	"Behind These Hazel Eyes"	Yes	Yes	Yes
2003	Kelly Clarkson	"Miss Independent"	Yes	Yes	Yes
2005	Kelly Clarkson	"Since U Been Gone"	Yes	Yes	Yes
2006	Kelly Clarkson	"Walk Away"	Yes	Yes	Yes
2007	The Killers	"For Reasons Unknown"	Yes	Yes	Yes
2008	The Killers	"Human"	Yes	Yes	Yes
2003	The Killers	"Mr. Brightside"	Yes	Yes	Yes
2007	The Killers	"Read My Mind"	Yes	Yes	Yes
2012	The Killers	"Runaways"	Yes	Yes	Yes
2004	The Killers	"Somebody Told Me"	Yes	Yes	Yes
2006	The Killers	When You Were Young	Yes	Yes	Yes
1999	Killing Heidi	"Weir"	Yes	Yes	No
2008	Kim Herold	"Social Butterfly"	Yes	Yes	No
1980	Kim Carnes	"Bette Davis Eyes"	Yes	Yes	Yes
1981	Kim Wilde	"Cambodia"	Yes	Yes	Yes
1981	Kim Wilde	"Kids in America"	Yes	Yes	Yes
1986	Kim Wilde	"You Keep Me Hangin' On"	Yes	Yes	Yes
2004	Kine	"In the Air Tonight"	Yes	Yes	Yes
1964	The Kinks	"You Really Got Me"	Yes	Yes	No
2005	Kisschasy	"Do-Do's & Whoa-Oh's"	Yes	Yes	No
2009	Kisschasy	"Generation Why"	Yes	Yes	No
2007	Kisschasy	"Opinions Won't Keep You Warm at Night"	Yes	Yes	No
2007	Kisschasy	"Spray On Pants"	Yes	Yes	No
2006	Klaxons	"Gravity's Rainbow"	Yes	Yes	No
2008	Kleerup feat. Marit Bergman	"3AM"	Unknown	Yes	Yes
2008	The Kooks	"Always Where I Need to Be"	Yes	Yes	Yes
1980	Kool & the Gang	"Celebration"	Yes	Yes	Unknown
1979	Kool & the Gang	"Ladies Night"	Yes	Yes	Yes
2009	Koop Arponen	"Every Song I Hear"	Yes	Yes	Yes
1999	Korn	"Freak on a Leash"	Yes	Yes	Unknown
2008	Kraak & Smaak feat. Ben Westbeech	"Squeeze Me"	Unknown	Yes	Yes
2007	Kreesha Turner	"Bounce With Me"	Yes	Yes	Unknown
2000	Krezip	"All Unsaid"	Yes	Yes	Unknown
2005	Krezip	"Don't Crush Me"	Yes	Yes	Unknown
2001	Krezip	"Everything And More"	Yes	Yes	Unknown
2000	Krezip	"I Would Stay"	Yes	Yes	Unknown
2001	Krezip	"In Her Sun (Stupid)"	Yes	Yes	Unknown
2005	Krezip	"Out of My Bed"	Unknown	Yes	Yes
2007	Krezip	"Plug It In and Turn Me Onl"	Unknown	Yes	Yes
2002	Krezip	"Promise"	Yes	Yes	Unknown
2002	Krezip	"That'll Be Me"	Yes	Yes	Unknown
2002	Krezip	"You Can Say"	Yes	Yes	Unknown
2005	KT Tunstall	"Black Horse and the Cherry Tree"	Yes	Yes	Yes
2005	KT Tunstall	"Suddenly I See"	Yes	Yes	Yes
1994	Kylie Minogue	"Confide in Me"	Yes	Yes	Yes
1988	Kylie Minogue & Jason Donovan	"Especially for You"	Yes	Yes	Yes
1992	Kylie Minogue	"Give Me Just a Little More Time"	No	Yes	Yes
1989	Kylie Minogue	"Hand on Your Heart"	No	Yes	Yes
1988	Kylie Minogue	"I Should Be So Lucky"	No	Yes	Yes
1988	Kylie Minogue	"Je ne sais pas pourquoi"	No	Yes	Yes
1987	Kylie Minogue	"Locomotion"	No	Yes	Yes
1990	Kylie Minogue	"Step Back in Time"	No	Yes	Yes
1991	Kylie Minogue	"What Do I Have to Do"	No	Yes	Yes
2009	La Roux	"Bulletproof"	Yes	Yes	Unknown
2009	La Roux	"In For The Kill"	Yes	Yes	No
2009	Lady Gaga	"Bad Romance"	Yes	Yes	Yes
2011	Lady Gaga	"Born This Way"	Yes	Yes	Yes
2009	Lady Gaga	"Eh, Eh (Nothing Else I Can Say)"	Yes	Yes	Yes
2009	Lady Gaga	"LoveGame"	Yes	Yes	Yes
2008	Lady Gaga	"Poker Face"	Yes	Yes	Yes
2008	Lady Gaga feat. Colby O'Donis	"Just Dance"	Yes	Yes	Yes
2000	Laid Back	"Sunshine Reggae"	No	Yes	Yes
2012	Lana Del Rey	"Blue Jeans"	Yes	Yes	Yes
2011	Lana Del Rey	"Born to Die"	Yes	Yes	Yes
2011	Lana Del Rey	"Video Games"	Yes	Yes	Yes
2012	Lawson	"Lawson"	Yes	Yes	Yes
2006	Lemar	"It's Not That Easy"	Yes	Yes	Yes
1999	Len	"Steal My Sunshine"	Yes	Yes	Yes
2010	Lena Meyer-Landrut	"Satellite"	Yes	Yes	Yes
1998	Lene Marlin	"Unforgivable Sinner"	Yes	Yes	Yes
2000	Lene Marlin	"Where I'm Headed"	Yes	Yes	Yes
1976	Leo Sayer	"You Make Me Feel Like Dancing"	Yes	Yes	Yes
2006	Leona Lewis	"A Moment Like This"	Yes	Yes	Yes
2009	Leona Lewis	"Happy"	Yes	Yes	Yes
2008	Leona Lewis	"Run"	Yes	Yes	Yes
2010	Leona Lewis	"I Got You"	Yes	Yes	Yes
1970	Leonard Cohen	"Famous Blue Raincoat"	Yes	Yes	Yes
1997	The Levellers	"What a Beautiful Day"	Yes	Yes	Yes
2007	Liars	"Freak Out"	Yes	Yes	Unknown
2004	The Libertines	"Can't Stand Me Now"	Yes	Yes	Yes
2002	Liberty X	"Just A Little"	Yes	Yes	No
2005	Lifehouse	"Blind"	Yes	Yes	No
1995	Lighthouse Family	"Lifted"	Yes	Yes	No
1998	Lightning Seeds	"Three Lions"	Yes	Yes	Yes
2004	Lil Wayne	"Go D.J."	Yes	Yes	No
2006	Lily Allen	"LDN"	Yes	Yes	Yes
2006	Lily Allen	"Littlest Things"	Yes	Yes	Yes
2009	Lily Allen	"Not Fair"	Yes	Yes	Unknown
2006	Lily Allen	"Smile"	Yes	Yes	Yes
2009	Lily Allen	"The Fear"	Yes	Yes	Yes
2000	Lionel Richie	"Angel"	Yes	Yes	No
1983	Lionel Richie	"All Night Long"	Yes	Yes	No
1984	Lionel Richie	"Hello"	Yes	Yes	No
1992	Lionel Richie	"My Destiny"	Yes	Yes	No
1985	Lionel Richie	"Say You, Say Me"	Yes	Yes	No
1982	Lionel Richie	"Truly"	Yes	Yes	No
1983	Lionel Richie	"You Are"	Yes	Yes	No
1994	Lisa Loeb	"Stay (I Missed You)"	Yes	Yes	Yes
2008	Lisa Mitchell	"Neopolitan Dreams"	Yes	Yes	Yes
1989	Lisa Stansfield	"All Around The World"	Yes	Yes	Yes
1987	LL Cool J	"I Need Love"	Yes	Yes	No
2007	Lloyd	"Get It Shawty"	Yes	Yes	Unknown
2012	Loreen	"Euphoria"	Yes	Yes	Yes
2006	Lordi	"Hard Rock Hallelujah"	Yes	Yes	Yes
1966	Los Bravos	"Black Is Black"	Yes	Yes	Yes
2007	Lostprophets	"4am Forever"	Yes	Yes	Yes
2006	Lostprophets	"A Town Called Hypocrisy"	Yes	Yes	Unknown
2006	Lostprophets	"Can't Catch Tomorrow"	Yes	Yes	Unknown
2001	Lostprophets	"Shinobi vs Dragon Ninja"	Yes	Yes	Yes
2004	Lostprophets	"Wake Up (Make a Move)"	Yes	Yes	Yes
2007	Loto	"Cuckoo Plan"	Yes	Yes	No
1999	Lou Bega	"Mambo No. 5 (A Little Bit Of...)"	Yes	Yes	Unknown
1966	Lovin' Spoonful	"Summer In The City"	Yes	Yes	Yes
2010	Lulla	"Bye A Bigger Plan"	Yes	Yes	Yes
1974	Lynyrd Skynyrd	"Sweet Home Alabama"	Yes	Yes	Yes
1993	M People	"Moving on Up"	Yes	Yes	Yes
1980	Madness	"Baggy Trousers"	Yes	Yes	Unknown
1982	Madness	"Driving in My Car"	Yes	Yes	Unknown
1982	Madness	"House of Fun"	Yes	Yes	Unknown
1981	Madness	"It Must Be Love"	Yes	Yes	Unknown
1979	Madness	"My Girl"	Yes	Yes	Unknown
1982	Madness	"Our House"	Yes	Yes	Unknown
2005	The Magic Numbers	"Forever Lost"	Yes	Yes	Yes
2007	The Magic Numbers	"This Is a Song"	Yes	Yes	Yes
1964	Manfred Mann	"Do Wah Diddy Diddy"	Yes	Yes	Yes
1996	Manic Street Preachers	"A Design for Life"	Yes	Yes	Yes
1996	Manic Street Preachers	"Everything Must Go"	Yes	Yes	Yes
1993	Manic Street Preachers	"La Tristesse Durera (Scream to a Sigh)"	Yes	Yes	Yes
1992	Manic Street Preachers	"Motorcycle Emptiness"	Yes	Yes	Yes
2007	Manic Street Preachers	"Your Love Alone Is Not Enough"	Yes	Yes	Yes
2007	Måns Zelmerlöw	"Cara Mia"	Yes	Yes	Yes
1991	Marc Cohn	"Walking In Memphis"	Yes	Yes	Yes
2006	Margaret Berger	"Samantha"	Yes	Yes	Yes
2008	Maria Mena	"Belly Up"	Yes	Yes	Unknown
2005	Maria Mena	"Just Hold Me"	Yes	Yes	Yes
2002	Maria Mena	"My Lullaby"	Yes	Yes	Yes
2004	Maria Mena	"You're the Only One"	Yes	Yes	No
1987	Marillion	"Incommunicado"	Yes	Yes	Yes
1985	Marillion	"Kayleigh"	Yes	Yes	Yes
2004	Marilyn Manson	"Personal Jesus"	Yes	Yes	No
2006	Marit Bergman	"No Party"	Yes	Yes	Yes
2007	Mark Medlock	"Now or Never"	Yes	Yes	Yes
2007	Mark Medlock & Dieter Bohlen	"You Can Get It"	Yes	Yes	Yes
2007	Mark Ronson feat. Daniel Merriweather	"Stop Me"	Yes	Yes	Yes
2008	Mark Ronson feat. Phantom Planet	"Just"	Yes	Yes	Yes
2011	Marlon Roudette	"New Age"	Yes	Yes	No
2007	Maroon 5	"Makes Me Wonder"	Yes	Yes	No
2004	Maroon 5	"She Will Be Loved"	Yes	Yes	No
2004	Maroon 5	"This Love"	Yes	Yes	No
1980	Martha and the Muffins	"Echo Beach"	Yes	Yes	Yes
1964	Martha Reeves	"Dancing in The Street"	Yes	Yes	No
1997	Martina McBride	"A Broken Wing"	No	Yes	Yes
1968	Marvin Gaye	"I Heard It Through The Grapevine"	Yes	Yes	No
1966	Marvin Gaye & Kim Weston	"It Takes Two"	Yes	Yes	No
1967	Marvin Gaye & Tammi Terrell	"Ain't No Mountain High Enough"	Yes	Yes	No
1998	Massive Attack	"Teardrop"	Yes	Yes	Yes
2005	Maxïmo Park	"Apply Some Pressure"	Yes	Yes	No
2007	Maxïmo Park	"Books from Boxes"	Yes	Yes	Yes
2005	Maxïmo Park	"The Coast Is Always Changing"	Yes	Yes	Yes
2007	Maxïmo Park	"Girls Who Play Guitars"	Yes	Yes	Yes
2005	Maxïmo Park	"Going Missing"	Yes	Yes	Yes
2005	Maxïmo Park	"Graffiti"	Yes	Yes	Yes
2005	Maxïmo Park	"I Want You to Stay"	Yes	Yes	Yes
2007	Maxïmo Park	"Our Velocity"	Yes	Yes	Yes
2009	Maxïmo Park	"Questing, Not Coasting"	Yes	Yes	Yes
1989	MC Hammer	"U Can't Touch This"	Yes	Yes	Yes
2004	McFly	"5 Colours in Her Hair"	Yes	Yes	No
1993	Meat Loaf	"I'd Do Anything For Love (But I Won't Do That)"	Yes	Yes	No
1995	Meat Loaf	"I'd Lie For You (And That's The Truth)"	Yes	Yes	No
1996	Meat Loaf	"Not A Dry Eye In The House"	Yes	Yes	No
1996	Meat Loaf	"Rock and Roll Dreams Come Through"	Yes	Yes	No
1986	Megadeth	"Peace Sells"	Yes	Yes	Yes
1987	Mel and Kim	"Respectable"	Yes	Yes	Yes
1986	Mel and Kim	"Showing Out (Get Fresh at the Weekend)"	Yes	Yes	Yes
1982	Men at Work	"Down Under"	Yes	Yes	Yes
1982	Men at Work	"Who Can It Be Now?"	Yes	Yes	Yes
1998	Mercury Rev	"Goddess on a Hiway"	Yes	Yes	Yes
1997	Meredith Brooks	"Bitch"	Yes	Yes	Yes
2008	Metro Station	"Shake It"	Yes	Yes	Yes
1988	Mica Paris	"My One Temptation"	Yes	Yes	No
1989	Michael Bolton	"How Am I Supposed to Live Without You"	Unknown	Yes	Yes
2007	Michael Bublé	"Everything"	Yes	Yes	Yes
2009	Michael Bublé	"Haven't Met You Yet"	Yes	Yes	Yes
2005	Michael Bublé	"Home"	Yes	Yes	Yes
2013	Michael Bublé	"It's a Beautiful Day"	Yes	Yes	Yes
1997	Mighty Mighty Bosstones	"The Impression That I Get"	Yes	Yes	Yes
2007	Mika	"Big Girl (You Are Beautiful)"	Yes	Yes	Yes
2006	Mika	"Grace Kelly"	Yes	Yes	Unknown
2009	Mika	"Rain"	Yes	Yes	No
2007	Mika	"Love Today"	Yes	Yes	Unknown
2006	Mika	"Relax (Take It Easy)"	Yes	Yes	Unknown
2009	Mika	"We Are Golden"	Yes	Yes	No
2000	Milk Inc.	"Walk On Water"	Yes	Yes	Yes
2004	Milk Inc.	"Whisper"	Yes	Yes	Unknown
1964	Millie	"My Boy Lollipop"	Yes	Yes	No
1974	Millie Jackson	"(If Loving You Is Wrong) I Don't Want to Be Right"	Yes	Yes	Yes
2008	Milow	"Out of My Hands"	Unknown	Yes	Yes
2008	Milow	"The Ride"	Yes	Yes	Yes
2007	Milow	"You Don't Know"	Yes	Yes	Yes
1997	MiNa feat. Pal Angleskar	"Living In Between"	Yes	Yes	Yes
1975	Minnie Riperton	"Lovin' You"	Yes	Yes	Yes
2002	Minor Majority	"Dancing in the Backyard"	No	Yes	Yes
2006	Minor Majority	"Supergirl"	No	Yes	Yes
1957	Miss Li	"Oh Boy"	Yes	Yes	Unknown
2001	Mis-Teeq	"One Night Stand"	Yes	Yes	No
1985	Modern Talking	"Cheri Cheri Lady"	Yes	Yes	Yes
1984	Modern Talking	"You're My Heart, You're My Soul"	Yes	Yes	Yes
1999	Moloko	"Sing It Back"	Yes	Yes	Yes
2000	Moloko	The Time Is Now"	Yes	Yes	Yes
1968	The Monkees	"Daydream Believer"	Yes	Yes	Yes
1983	The Monroes	"Sunday People"	Yes	Yes	Yes
2007	Moriarty	"Jimmy"	Yes	Yes	Unknown
1988	Morrissey	"Everyday Is Like Sunday"	Yes	Yes	No
1988	Morrissey	"Suedehead"	Yes	Yes	No
2007	Motion City Soundtrack	"This Is for Real"	Yes	Yes	Yes
1980	Motörhead	"Ace Of Spades"	Yes	Yes	Yes
1999	Motorpsycho	"The Other Fool"	Yes	Yes	Yes
1991	Mr. Big	"To Be With You"	Yes	Yes	Yes
2009	Mr Hudson feat. Kanye West	"Supernova"	Yes	Yes	Yes
1974	Mud	"Lonely This Christmas"	Yes	Yes	Yes
2006	Muse	"Supermassive Black Hole"	Yes	Yes	Unknown
1982	Musical Youth	"Pass the Dutchie"	Yes	Yes	Unknown
2007	My Chemical Romance	"Teenagers"	Yes	Yes	Yes
2006	My Chemical Romance	"Welcome to the Black Parade"	Yes	Yes	Yes
2007	N-Dubz	"Feva Las Vegas"	Yes	Yes	No
2009	N-Dubz	"I Need You"	Yes	Yes	No
2009	N-Dubz	"Strong Again"	Yes	Yes	No
1983	Naked Eyes	"Always Something There to Remind Me"	Yes	Yes	Yes
2004	Natalia	"Fragile Not Broken"	Yes	Yes	Yes
2007	Natalia	"Gone to Stay"	Yes	Yes	Yes
2008	Natalia	"I Survived You"	Yes	Yes	Yes
2003	Natalia	"I Want You Back"	Yes	Yes	Yes
2003	Natalia	"I've Only Begun to Fight"	Yes	Yes	Yes
2004	Natalia	"Shelter"	Yes	Yes	Yes
2005	Natalie Imbruglia	"Shiver"	Yes	Yes	Yes
1997	Natalie Imbruglia	"Torn"	Yes	Yes	Yes
2008	Natasha Bedingfield	"Pocketful of Sunshine"	Yes	Yes	Yes
2004	Natasha Bedingfield	"Single"	Yes	Yes	Yes
2004	Natasha Bedingfield	"These Words"	Yes	Yes	Yes
2004	Natasha Bedingfield	"Unwritten"	Yes	Yes	Yes
1991	Naughty by Nature	"O.P.P."	Yes	Yes	Yes
2006	Nelly Furtado	"Maneater"	Yes	Yes	Yes
2001	Nelly Furtado	"Turn Off the Light"	Yes	Yes	Yes
1983	Nena	"99 Red Balloons"	Yes	Yes	Yes
2008	Neverstore	"Rejected All Along"	Yes	Yes	Yes
1999	New Found Glory	"Hit or Miss"	Yes	Yes	No
1990	New Kids on the Block	"Step by Step"	Yes	Yes	Yes
1988	New Order	"Blue Monday 1988"	Yes	Yes	Yes
1993	New Order	"World (The Price of Love)"	Yes	Yes	Yes
2007	Newton Faulkner	"All I Got"	Yes	Yes	Yes
2007	Newton Faulkner	"I Need Something"	Yes	Yes	Yes
2007	Newton Faulkner	"Teardrop"	Yes	Yes	Yes
2007	Ne-Yo	"Because Of You"	Yes	Yes	No
1990	Nick Kamen	"I Promised Myself"	Yes	Yes	Yes
1997	Nick Cave And The Bad Seeds	"Are You The One That I've Been Waiting For?"	Yes	Yes	Unknown
1997	Nick Cave And The Bad Seeds	"Into My Arms"	Yes	Yes	Unknown
1992	Nick Cave and the Bad Seeds	"The Ship Song"	Yes	Yes	Yes
2000	Nick Cave and the Bad Seeds and Kylie Minogue	"Where the Wild Roses Grow"	Yes	Yes	No
2009	Nickelback	"Burn It to the Ground"	Yes	Yes	Yes
2008	Nickelback	"Gotta Be Somebody"	Yes	Yes	Yes
2007	Nightwish	"Amaranth"	Yes	Yes	Yes
2008	Nightwish	"Bye Bye Beautiful"	Yes	Yes	Yes
2004	Nightwish	"Nemo"	Yes	Yes	Yes
2011	Nightwish	"Storytime"	Yes	Yes	Yes
2008	Nightwish	"The Islander"	Yes	Yes	Yes
2004	Nightwish	"Wish I Had an Angel"	Yes	Yes	Yes
1983	Nik Kershaw	"I Won't Let the Sun Go Down on Me"	Yes	Yes	No
1984	Nik Kershaw	"Wouldn't It Be Good"	Yes	Yes	No
1992	Nirvana	"Come As You Are"	Yes	Yes	Yes
1992	Nirvana	"Lithium"	Yes	Yes	No
1996	No Doubt	"Don't Speak"	Yes	Yes	No
2000	No Doubt	"Ex-Girlfriend"	Yes	Yes	No
2002	No Doubt	"Hella Good"	Yes	Yes	No
1995	No Doubt	"Just a Girl"	Yes	Yes	No
2003	No Doubt	"Running (No Doubt song)"	Yes	Yes	No
1996	No Doubt	"Spiderwebs"	Yes	Yes	No
2001	No Doubt feat. Bounty Killer	"Hey Baby"	Yes	Yes	No
2000	'N Sync	"Bye Bye Bye"	Yes	Yes	Yes
1996	'N Sync	"I Want You Back"	Yes	Yes	Yes
1996	Oasis	"Champagne Supernova"	Yes	Yes	Yes
1996	Oasis	"Don't Look Back in Anger"	Yes	Yes	Yes
2009	Oasis	"Falling Down"	Yes	Yes	Yes
2005	Oasis	"The Importance of Being Idle"	Yes	Yes	Yes
2002	Oasis	"Little by Little"	Yes	Yes	Yes
1994	Oasis	"Live Forever"	Yes	Yes	Yes
2005	Oasis	"Lyla"	Yes	Yes	Yes
1995	Oasis	"Morning Glory"	Yes	Yes	Yes
1995	Oasis	"Some Might Say"	Yes	Yes	Yes
2002	Oasis	"Stop Crying Your Heart Out"	Yes	Yes	Yes
1994	Oasis	"Supersonic"	Yes	Yes	Yes
1995	Oasis	"Wonderwall"	Yes	Yes	Yes
1997	The Offspring	"All I Want"	Yes	Yes	Yes
1995	The Offspring	"Gotta Get Away"	Yes	Yes	Yes
2003	The Offspring	"Hit That"	Yes	Yes	Yes
1998	The Offspring	"Pretty Fly (For A White Guy)"	Yes	Yes	Unknown
1994	The Offspring	"Self Esteem"	Yes	Yes	Yes
2000	The Offspring	"Want You Bad"	Yes	Yes	Yes
2008	The Offspring	"You're Gonna Go Far, Kid"	Yes	Yes	Yes
2011	Olly Murs	"Dance with Me Tonight"	Yes	Yes	Yes
2010	Olly Murs	"Please Don't Let Me Go"	Yes	Yes	Yes
2012	One Direction	"Live While We're Young"	Yes	Yes	Yes
2007	One Love Family	"Reggae Music"	Yes	Yes	Yes
2013	OneRepublic	"Counting Stars"	Yes	Yes	Yes
2007	OneRepublic	"Stop And Stare"	Yes	Yes	Yes
2003	One True Voice	"Shakespeare's (Way With) Words"	Yes	Yes	Yes
2001	Opus X	"Loving You Girl"	Yes	Yes	Yes
2006	Orson	"No Tomorrow"	Yes	Yes	No
1985	The Outfield	"Your Love"	Yes	Yes	Yes
2003	OutKast	"Hey Ya!"	Yes	Yes	Yes
2006	OutKast	"Idlewild Blue (Don't chu Worry 'Bout Me)"	Yes	Yes	Yes
2001	OutKast	"Ms. Jackson"	Yes	Yes	Yes
2004	OutKast	"Roses"	Yes	Yes	Yes
2003	Paddy Casey	"Saints and Sinners"	Yes	Yes	Yes
1998	Paddy Casey	"Whatever Gets You True"	Yes	Yes	No
2009	Paloma Faith	"New York"	Yes	Yes	Yes
2014	Paloma Faith	"Only Love Can Hurt Like This"	Yes	Yes	Yes
2012	Paloma Faith	"Picking Up the Pieces"	Yes	Yes	Yes
2009	Paloma Faith	"Stone Cold Sober"	Yes	Yes	Yes
2006	Panic! at the Disco	"But It's Better If You Do"	Yes	Yes	Yes
2005	Panic! at the Disco	"I Write Sins Not Tragedies"	Yes	Yes	Yes
2008	Panic! at the Disco	"Nine in the Afternoon"	Yes	Yes	Yes
2008	Panic! at the Disco	"That Green Gentleman (Things Have Changed)"	Yes	Yes	Yes
1992	Pantera	"Walk"	Yes	Yes	No
2013	Passenger	"Let Her Go"	Yes	Yes	Yes
1961	Patsy Cline	"Crazy"	Yes	Yes	Unknown
1980	Paul McCartney	"Coming Up"	Yes	Yes	Unknown
2007	Paul McCartney	"Dance Tonight"	Yes	Yes	Yes
1983	Paul McCartney	"Pipes of Peace"	Yes	Yes	Yes
1979	Paul McCartney	"Wonderful Christmastime"	Yes	Yes	Yes
1984	Paul McCartney and the Frog Chorus	"We All Stand Together"	Yes	Yes	Yes
1973	Paul McCartney and Wings	"Jet"	Yes	Yes	Yes
1989	Paula Abdul	"Opposites Attract"	Yes	Yes	Yes
1983	Peabo Bryson and Roberta Flack	"Tonight I Celebrate My Love"	Yes	Yes	Yes
1958	Peggy Lee	"Fever"	Yes	Yes	Yes
2007	Pendulum	"Granite"	Yes	Yes	Yes
1957	Perry Como	"Magic Moments"	Yes	Yes	Yes
1987	Pet Shop Boys	"Always on My Mind"	Yes	Yes	Yes
1993	Pet Shop Boys	"Go West"	Yes	Yes	No
1988	Pet Shop Boys	"Heart"	Yes	Yes	Yes
2002	Pet Shop Boys	"I Get Along"	Yes	Yes	Unknown
1987	Pet Shop Boys	"It's a Sin"	Yes	Yes	Unknown
1985	Pet Shop Boys	"Opportunities"	Yes	Yes	Unknown
1987	Pet Shop Boys	"Rent"	Yes	Yes	Unknown
1996	Pet Shop Boys	"Single Bilingual"	Yes	Yes	Unknown
2000	Pet Shop Boys	"You Only Tell Me You Love Me When You're Drunk"	Yes	Yes	Unknown
1985	Pet Shop Boys	"West End Girls"	Yes	Yes	Yes
1995	Peter Andre	"Mysterious Girl"	Yes	Yes	Yes
1964	Petula Clark	"Downtown"	Yes	Yes	No
2006	Phoenix	"Consolation Prizes"	Yes	Yes	Unknown
2004	Phoenix	"Everything Is Everything"	Yes	Yes	Unknown
2008	The Pigeon Detectives	"Everybody Wants Me"	No	Yes	No
2007	The Pigeon Detectives	"I'm Not Sorry"	No	Yes	No
2008	The Pigeon Detectives	"This Is an Emergency"	No	Yes	No
2001	P!nk	"Don't Let Me Get Me"	Yes	Yes	Yes
2001	P!nk	"Family Portrait"	Yes	Yes	Yes
2010	P!nk	"Fuckin' Perfect"	Yes	Yes	Yes
2001	P!nk	"Get the Party Started"	Yes	Yes	Yes
2009	P!nk	"I Don't Believe You"	Yes	Yes	Yes
2001	P!nk	"Just Like a Pill"	Yes	Yes	Yes
2004	P!nk	"Last To Know"	Yes	Yes	Yes
2007	P!nk	"Leave Me Alone (I'm Lonely)"	Yes	Yes	Yes
2000	P!nk	"Most Girls"	Yes	Yes	Yes
2006	P!nk	"Nobody Knows"	Yes	Yes	Yes
2008	P!nk	"So What"	Yes	Yes	Yes
2006	P!nk	"U + Ur Hand"	Yes	Yes	No
2006	P!nk	"Who Knew"	Yes	Yes	Yes
2007	The Pipettes	"Pull Shapes"	Yes	Yes	Yes
2011	Pitbull feat. Chris Brown	"International Love"	Yes	Yes	Yes
2011	Pixie Lott	"All About Tonight"	Yes	Yes	No
2009	Pixie Lott	"Boys & Girls"	Yes	Yes	No
2012	Pixie Lott	"Kiss the Stars"	Yes	Yes	No
2009	Pixie Lott	"Mama Do"	Yes	Yes	No
1989	Pixies	"Here Comes Your Man"	Yes	Yes	Yes
2010	Placebo	"Bright Lights"	Yes	Yes	Yes
1999	Placebo	"Every You Every Me"	Yes	Yes	No
1997	Placebo	"Nancy Boy"	Yes	Yes	No
1998	Placebo	"Pure Morning"	Yes	Yes	Yes
2008	Plain White Ts	"1, 2, 3, 4"	Yes	Yes	Yes
2006	Plain White Ts	"Hey There Delilah"	Yes	Yes	Yes
1988	Poison	"Every Rose Has Its Thorn"	Yes	Yes	Yes
1988	Poison	"Fallen Angel"	Yes	Yes	Yes
1988	Poison	"Nothin' but a Good Time"	Yes	Yes	Yes
1990	Poison	"Unskinny Bop"	Yes	Yes	Unknown
1980	The Police	"Don't Stand So Close To Me"	Yes	Yes	Unknown
2006	The Poodles	"Metal Will Stand Tall"	Unknown	Yes	Unknown
2006	The Poodles	"Night of Passion"	Yes	Yes	Yes
2008	The Poodles	"Raise the Banner"	Yes	Yes	Yes
2007	The Poodles	"Seven Seas"	Yes	Yes	Unknown
2006	The Poodles	"Song For You"	Yes	Yes	Unknown
2007	The Poodles	"Streets Of Fire"	Yes	Yes	Unknown
2007	The Potbelleez	"Don't Hold Back"	Yes	Yes	Yes
1984	The Pretenders	"Brass in Pocket"	Yes	Yes	Yes
1992	Primal Scream	"Movin' On Up"	Yes	Yes	Yes
1994	Primal Scream	"Rocks"	Yes	Yes	No
1991	Primus	"Jerry Was a Race Car Driver"	Yes	Yes	No
1995	Primus	"Wynona's Big Brown Beaver"	Yes	Yes	No
1987	The Proclaimers	"Letter from America"	Yes	Yes	Yes
1988	The Proclaimers	"I'm Gonna Be (500 Miles)"	Yes	Yes	Yes
1995	Pulp	"Common People"	Yes	Yes	No
2005	The Pussycat Dolls	"Don't Cha"	Yes	Yes	No
2009	The Pussycat Dolls	"Hush Hush; Hush Hush"	Yes	Yes	No
2008	The Pussycat Dolls	"When I Grow Up"	Yes	Yes	No
1980	Queen	"Another One Bites the Dust"	Yes	Yes	No
1978	Queen	"Bicycle Race"	Yes	Yes	No
1975	Queen	"Bohemian Rhapsody"	Yes	Yes	No
1979	Queen	"Crazy Little Thing Called Love"	Yes	Yes	No
1989	Queen	"Breakthru"	Yes	Yes	No
1978	Queen	"Don't Stop Me Now"	Yes	Yes	No
1978	Queen	"Fat Bottomed Girls"	Yes	Yes	Unknown
1984	Queen	"Hammer to Fall"	Yes	Yes	No
1991	Queen	"Headlong"	Yes	Yes	No
1989	Queen	"I Want It All"	Yes	Yes	No
1984	Queen	"I Want To Break Free"	Yes	Yes	No
1975	Queen	"I'm in Love with My Car"	Yes	Yes	Unknown
1991	Queen	"I'm Going Slightly Mad"	Yes	Yes	Unknown
1991	Queen	"Innuendo"	Yes	Yes	No
1984	Queen	"It's a Hard Life"	Yes	Yes	No
1974	Queen	"Killer Queen"	Yes	Yes	No
1986	Queen	"A Kind of Magic"	Yes	Yes	No
1985	Queen	"One Vision"	Yes	Yes	No
1980	Queen	"Play The Game"	Yes	Yes	No
1986	Queen	"Princes of the Universe"	Yes	Yes	No
1984	Queen	"Radio Ga Ga"	Yes	Yes	No
1980	Queen	"Save Me"	Yes	Yes	No
1991	Queen	"The Show Must Go On"	Yes	Yes	No
1976	Queen	"Somebody To Love"	Yes	Yes	Unknown
1991	Queen	"These Are the Days of Our Lives"	Yes	Yes	No
1977	Queen	"Tie Your Mother Down"	Yes	Yes	Unknown
1981	Queen	"Under Pressure"	Yes	Yes	No
1977	Queen	"We are the Champions"	Yes	Yes	No
1978	Queen	"We Will Rock You"	Yes	Yes	No
1986	Queen	"Who Wants to Live Forever"	Yes	Yes	No
1976	Queen	"You're My Best Friend"	Yes	Yes	Unknown
2003	Queens of the Stone Age	"Go With The Flow"	Yes	Yes	No
1983	Quiet Riot	"Cum on Feel the Noize"	Yes	Yes	Yes
1992	R.E.M.	"Everybody Hurts"	Yes	Yes	Yes
1991	R.E.M.	"Losing My Religion"	Yes	Yes	Yes
1988	R.E.M.	"Orange Crush"	Yes	Yes	Yes
1988	R.E.M.	"Stand"	Yes	Yes	Yes
1994	R.E.M.	"What's the Frequency, Kenneth?"	Yes	Yes	Yes
2008	The Raconteurs	"Salute Your Solution"	Yes	Yes	Unknown
2006	The Raconteurs	"Steady, As She Goes"	No	Yes	
1992	Radiohead	"Creep"	Yes	Yes	Yes
1995	Radiohead	"Fake Plastic Trees"	Yes	Yes	Yes
1995	Radiohead	"High and Dry"	Yes	Yes	Yes
1995	Radiohead	"Just"	Yes	Yes	Yes
1997	Radiohead	"Karma Police"	Yes	Yes	Yes
1998	Radiohead	"No Surprises"	Yes	Yes	Unknown
1997	Radiohead	"Paranoid Android"	Yes	Yes	Yes
2001	Radiohead	"Pyramid Song"	Yes	Yes	Yes
1996	Radiohead	"Street Spirit"	Yes	Yes	Yes
1970	Rainbow	"Since You've Been Gone"	Yes	Yes	No
1978	Ramones	"I Wanna Be Sedated"	Yes	Yes	Yes
2001	The Rasmus	"Chill"	Yes	Yes	Yes
2003	The Rasmus	"First Day of My Life"	Yes	Yes	No
2003	The Rasmus	"Guilty"	Yes	Yes	Yes
2003	The Rasmus	"In My Life"	Yes	Yes	Yes
2003	The Rasmus	"In the Shadows"	Yes	Yes	Yes
2008	The Rasmus	"Livin' in a World Without You"	Yes	Yes	Unknown
2005	The Rasmus	"No Fear"	Yes	Yes	Yes
2005	The Rasmus	"Shot"	Yes	Yes	Yes
1961	Ray Charles	"Hit the Road Jack"	Yes	Yes	Unknown
2006	Razorlight	"America"	Yes	Yes	No
2006	Razorlight	"Before I Fall to Pieces"	Yes	Yes	No
2004	Razorlight	"Golden Touch"	Yes	Yes	No
2006	Razorlight	"In The Morning"	Yes	Yes	No
2005	Razorlight	"Somewhere Else"	Yes	Yes	No
2004	Razorlight	"Vice"	Yes	Yes	No
2008	Razorlight	"Wire to Wire"	Yes	Yes	No
2000	Reamonn	"Supergirl"	Yes	Yes	No
1994	Rednex	"Cotton Eye Joe"	Yes	Yes	Yes
1994	Rednex	"Old Pop In An Oak"	Yes	Yes	Yes
2007	Richard Hawley	"Tonight the Streets Are Ours"	Yes	Yes	Yes
2008	Richard Hawley	"Valentine"	No	Yes	Yes
1992	Richard Marx	"Hazard"	Yes	Yes	Yes
1989	Richard Marx	"Right Here Waiting"	Yes	Yes	Yes
1986	Rick Astley	"Never Gonna Give You Up"	Yes	Yes	Yes
1987	Rick Astley	"Together Forever"	Yes	Yes	Yes
1981	Rick James	"Super Freak"	Unknown	Yes	Yes
1999	Ricky Martin	"Livin' la Vida Loca"	Yes	Yes	Yes
1999	Ricky Martin	"Shake Your Bon-Bon"	Yes	Yes	Yes
2002	Right Said Fred	"Stand Up (For the Champions)"	Yes	Yes	Yes
2001	Right Said Fred	"You're My Mate"	Yes	Yes	Yes
1965	The Righteous Brothers	"Unchained Melody"	Yes	Yes	Yes
2006	Rihanna	"Unfaithful"	Yes	Yes	Yes
2006	Rihanna	"We Ride"	Yes	Yes	No
2008	Rita Redshoes	"Dream on Girl"	Yes	Yes	Yes
1994	Roachford	"Only to Be with You"	Yes	Yes	Yes
1997	Robbie Williams	"Angels"	Yes	Yes	Yes
2005	Robbie Williams	"Advertising Space"	Yes	Yes	Yes
2009	Robbie Williams	"Bodies"	Yes	Yes	Yes
1997	Robbie Williams	"Let Me Entertain You"	Yes	Yes	Yes
2000	Robbie Williams	"Rock DJ"	Yes	Yes	Yes
2001	Robbie Williams & Nicole Kidman	"Somethin' Stupid"	Yes	Yes	Yes
2005	Robbie Williams	"Tripping"	Yes	Yes	Yes
1986	Robert Palmer	"Addicted To Love"	Yes	Yes	Yes
1997	Robyn	"Show Me Love"	Yes	Yes	Yes
1984	Rockwell	"Somebody's Watching Me"	Yes	Yes	No
2005	Rogue Traders	"Voodoo Child"	Yes	Yes	Yes
2000	Ronan Keating	"Life Is A Rollercoaster"	Yes	Yes	No
2001	Ronan Keating	"Lovin' Each Day"	Yes	Yes	No
2004	Ronan Keating feat. Yusuf Islam	"Father and Son"	Yes	Yes	No
2008	Rongedal	"Just a Minute"	Yes	Yes	Yes
2007	Rooney	"When Did Your Heart Go Missing?"	Yes	Yes	No
2003	Rooster	"Come Get Some"	Yes	Yes	Yes
2001	Roots Manuva	"Witness (One Hope)"	Yes	Yes	No
1989	Roxette	"Dressed for Success"	Yes	Yes	No
1991	Roxette	"Fading Like A Flower"	Yes	Yes	No
1987	Roxette	"It Must Have Been Love"	Yes	Yes	No
1991	Roxette	"Joyride"	Yes	Yes	No
1989	Roxette	"Listen To Your Heart"	Yes	Yes	No
1994	Roxette	"Run To You"	Yes	Yes	No
2011	Roxette	"She's Got Nothing On (But the Radio)"	Yes	Yes	No
1994	Roxette	"Sleeping in My Car"	Yes	Yes	No
1991	Roxette	"Spending My Time"	Yes	Yes	No
1989	Roxette	"The Look"	Yes	Yes	No
1999	Roxette	"Wish I Could Fly"	Yes	Yes	No
1982	Roxy Music	"Avalon"	Yes	Yes	Yes
1981	Roxy Music	"Jealous Guy"	Yes	Yes	Yes
1975	Roxy Music	"Love Is the Drug"	Yes	Yes	Yes
1982	Roxy Music	"More Than This"	Yes	Yes	Yes
1963	Roy Orbison	"Blue Bayou"	Yes	Yes	Yes
1962	Roy Orbison	"Crying"	Yes	Yes	Yes
1992	Roy Orbison	"I Drove All Night"	Yes	Yes	Unknown
1987	Roy Orbison	"In Dreams"	Yes	Yes	Yes
1964	Roy Orbison	"Oh, Pretty Woman"	Yes	Yes	Yes
1961	Roy Orbison	"Only the Lonely (Know the Way I Feel)"	Yes	Yes	Yes
1963	Roy Orbison	"Pretty Paper"	Yes	Yes	Yes
1986	Run-D.M.C.	"It's Tricky"	Yes	Yes	Yes
2013	Rudimental Feat. Ella Eyre	"Waiting All Night"	Yes	Yes	Yes
2004	Ruslana	"Wild Dances"	Yes	Yes	Unknown
2003	Ryan Cabrera	"On the Way Down"	Yes	Yes	Yes
1984	Sade	"Smooth Operator"	Yes	Yes	Unknown
1976	The Saints	"(I'm) Stranded"	Yes	Yes	Yes
2006	Salem Al Fakir	"Good Song"	Yes	Yes	Yes
1987	Salt-n-Pepa	"Push It"	Yes	Yes	Yes
2008	Sam Sparro	"Black And Gold"	Yes	Yes	No
2005	Sandi Thom	"I Wish I Was a Punk Rocker (With Flowers in My Hair)"	Yes	Yes	No
1985	Sandra	"(I'll Never Be) Maria Magdalena"	Yes	Yes	Yes
2008	Sanna Nielsen	"Empty Room"	Yes	Yes	Yes
2005	Sanne Salomonsen	"Everybody's Eyes On You"	Yes	Yes	Yes
2005	Sanne Salomonsen	"You've Never Been Loved Before"	No	Yes	Yes
2008	Santogold	"L.E.S. Artistes"	Yes	Yes	Yes
2008	Sara Bareilles	Bottle It Up	No	Yes	No
2008	Sara Bareilles	Love Song	No	Yes	Yes
2003	Sarah Connor	"Bounce"	Yes	Yes	No
1997	Sarah McLachlan	"Building a Mystery"	Yes	Yes	Unknown
2008	The Saturdays	"Chasing Lights"	Yes	Yes	No
2008	The Saturdays	"Fall"	Yes	Yes	No
2008	The Saturdays	"Issues"	Yes	Yes	No
2009	The Saturdays	"Just Can't Get Enough"	Yes	Yes	No
2008	The Saturdays	"Set Me Off"	Yes	Yes	No
2008	The Saturdays	"Up"	Yes	Yes	No
1997	Savage Garden	"To the Moon and Back"	Yes	Yes	Yes
1997	Savage Garden	"I Want You"	Yes	No	No
2001	Saves the Day	"At Your Funeral"	Yes	Yes	Unknown
2002	Saybia	"The Day After Tomorrow"	Yes	Yes	Yes
2003	Scissor Sisters	"Laura"	Yes	Yes	Unknown
2004	Scissor Sisters	"Take Your Mama"	Yes	Yes	No
1984	Scorpions	"Rock You Like a Hurricane"	Yes	Yes	No
1984	Scorpions	"Still Loving You"	Yes	Yes	No
1991	Scorpions	"Wind Of Change"	Yes	Yes	No
1967	Scott McKenzie	"San Francisco (Be Sure to Wear Flowers in Your Hair)"	Yes	Yes	Yes
2007	Scouting for Girls	"Elvis Ain't Dead"	Yes	Yes	Yes
2007	Scouting for Girls	"Heartbeat"	Yes	Yes	Yes
2007	Scouting for Girls	"It's Not About You"	Yes	Yes	Yes
2007	Scouting for Girls	"She's So Lovely"	Yes	Yes	Yes
1991	Screaming Jets	"Better"	Yes	Yes	Yes
2008	The Script	"The Man Who Can't Be Moved"	Yes	Yes	Yes
2008	The Script	"We Cry"	Yes	Yes	Yes
1991	Seal	"Crazy"	Yes	Yes	Yes
1991	Seal	"Killer"	Yes	Yes	Yes
1994	Seal	"Kiss from a Rose"	Yes	Yes	Yes
2007	Self Against City	"Becoming a Monster"	Yes	Yes	Yes
2006	Senses Fail	"Can't be Saved"	Yes	Yes	Yes
2005	Septembersha	"Satellites"	Yes	Yes	Yes
1992	Shaggy	"Oh Carolina"	Yes	Yes	Yes
1981	Shakin' Stevens	"Green Door"	Yes	Yes	Yes
1985	Shakin' Stevens	"Merry Christmas Everyone"	Yes	Yes	Yes
1981	Shakin' Stevens	"This Ole House"	Yes	Yes	Yes
1998	Shania Twain	"That Don't Impress Me Much"	Yes	Yes	Yes
1999	Shania Twain	"Man! I Feel Like a Woman!"	Yes	Yes	Yes
2007	Shannon Noll	"Loud"	Yes	Yes	Yes
2004	Shannon Noll	"What About Me"	Yes	Yes	Yes
2006	Shapeshifter	"Bring Change"	Yes	Yes	No
2005	Shayne Ward	"That's My Goal"	Yes	Yes	Yes
1969	Shocking Blue	"Venus"	Yes	Yes	Yes
2014	Sigma feat. Paloma Faith	"Changing"	Yes	Yes	Yes
2000	Silverchair	"Tomorrow"	Yes	Yes	No
2008	Simon Mathew	"All Night Long"	No	Yes	Yes
1985	Simple Minds	"Alive and Kicking"	Yes	Yes	Yes
1985	Simple Minds	"Don't You (Forget About Me)"	Yes	Yes	Yes
2004	Simple Plan	"Shut Up!"	Yes	Yes	Yes
2004	Simple Plan	"Welcome to My Life"	Yes	Yes	Yes
1985	Simply Red	"Holding Back the Years"	Yes	Yes	Yes
1991	Simply Red	"Stars"	Yes	Yes	Yes
1991	Simply Red	"Something Got Me Started"	Yes	Yes	Yes
1988	Sinitta	"Cross My Broken Heart"	Yes	Yes	Unknown
1979	Sister Sledge	"He's the Greatest Dancer"	Yes	Yes	Yes
1979	Sister Sledge	"Lost in Music"	Yes	Yes	Yes
1979	Sister Sledge	"We Are Family"	Yes	Yes	Yes
1998	Sixpence None The Richer	"Kiss Me"	Yes	Yes	Yes
1973	Slade	"Merry Xmas Everybody"	Yes	Yes	Yes
2008	Slimmy	"Beatsound Loverboy"	Yes	Yes	Yes
1981	Smokey Robinson	"Being With You"	Yes	Yes	No
1992	Snap!	"Rhythm Is a Dancer"	Yes	Yes	Yes
1990	Snap!	"The Power"	Yes	Yes	Yes
2002	Snoop Dogg feat. Pharrell, Uncle Charlie, Wilson	"Beautiful"	Yes	Yes	Yes
2006	Snow Patrol	"Chasing Cars"	Yes	Yes	No
2004	Snow Patrol	"Chocolate"	Yes	Yes	No
2008	Snow Patrol	"Crack the Shutters"	Yes	Yes	No
2004	Snow Patrol	"Run"	Yes	Yes	No
2007	Snow Patrol	"Shut Your Eyes"	Yes	Yes	No
2007	Snow Patrol	"Signal Fire"	Yes	Yes	No
2004	Snow Patrol	"Spitting Games"	Yes	Yes	No
2008	Snow Patrol	"Take Back the City"	Unknown	Yes	Unknown
2006	Snow Patrol	"You're All I Have"	Unknown	Yes	Unknown
2006	Snow Patrol And Martha Wainwright	"Set the Fire to the Third Bar"	Yes	Yes	No
2002	Something Corporate	"Hurricane"	Yes	Yes	No
1965	Sonny & Cher	"I Got You Babe"	Yes	Yes	Yes
2001	Sophie Ellis-Bextor	"Murder on the Dancefloor"	Yes	Yes	No
2005	Spleen United	"Spleen United"	Yes	Yes	Yes
1981	Soft Cell	"Tainted Love"	Yes	Yes	Yes
1996	Soulwax	"Caramel"	Yes	Yes	Yes
2006	The Sounds	"Painted by Numbers"	Yes	Yes	Yes
1983	Spandau Ballet	"Gold"	Yes	Yes	Yes
1982	Spandau Ballet	"Lifeline"	Yes	Yes	Yes
1986	Spandau Ballet	"Through the Barricades"	Yes	Yes	Yes
1980	Spandau Ballet	"To Cut a Long Story Short"	Yes	Yes	Yes
1982	Spandau Ballet	"True"	Yes	Yes	Yes
1979	The Specials	"A Message To You Rudy"	Yes	Yes	Yes
1981	The Specials	"Ghost Town"	Yes	Yes	Yes
1980	The Specials	"Too Much Too Young"	Yes	Yes	Yes
1965	The Spencer Davis Group	"Keep On Running"	Yes	Yes	No
1998	Spice Girls	"Goodbye"	Yes	Yes	Yes
2007	Spice Girls	"Headlines (Friendship Never Ends)"	Yes	Yes	Yes
1996	Spice Girls	"Say You'll Be There"	Yes	Yes	Yes
1997	Spice Girls	"Spice Up Your Life"	Yes	Yes	Yes
1995	Spice Girls	"Wannabe"	Yes	Yes	Yes
1996	Spice Girls	"Who Do You Think You Are"	Yes	Yes	Yes
1993	Spin Doctors	"Little Miss Can't Be Wrong"	Yes	Yes	Yes
1991	Spin Doctors	"Two Princes"	Yes	Yes	Yes
2005	Spleen United	"Spleen United"	Yes	Yes	Yes
1979	Squeeze	"Cool for Cats"	Yes	Yes	No
1981	Squeeze	"Tempted"	Yes	Yes	No
1979	Squeeze	"Up the Junction"	Yes	Yes	No
1950	The Stanley Brothers with The Clinch Mountain Boys	"I'm A Man Of Constant Sorrow"	Yes	Yes	No
2009	Starsailor	"Tell Me It's Not Over"	Yes	Yes	Unknown
1985	Starship	"We Built This City"	Yes	Yes	Yes
1974	Status Quo	"Down Down"	Yes	Yes	Yes
1979	Status Quo	"Whatever You Want"	Yes	Yes	Yes
1968	Steppenwolf	"Born to Be Wild"	Yes	Yes	No
1999	Steps	"Deeper Shade of Blue"	Yes	Yes	Yes
2001	Steps	"It's the Way You Make Me Feel"	Yes	Yes	Yes
1998	Steps	"Last Thing on My Mind"	Yes	Yes	Yes
1998	Steps	"One for Sorrow"	Yes	Yes	Yes
1992	Stereo MC's	"Connected"	Yes	Yes	No
1999	Stereophonics	"The Bartender and the Thief"	Yes	Yes	Yes
2010	Stereophonics	"Could You Be the One"	Yes	Yes	No
2005	Stereophonics	"Dakota"	Yes	Yes	Yes
2001	Stereophonics	"Have a Nice Day"	Yes	Yes	No
2009	Stereophonics	"Innocent"	Yes	Yes	No
1999	Stereophonics	"Just Looking"	Yes	Yes	No
2003	Stereophonics	"Maybe Tomorrow"	Yes	Yes	No
2003	Steriogram	"Walkie Talkie Man"	Yes	Yes	Yes
1968	Stevie Wonder	"For Once in My Life"	Yes	Yes	Yes
1988	Sting	"Englishman In New York"	Yes	Yes	No
1996	The Stone Roses	"Fools Gold"	Yes	Yes	Yes
1992	The Stone Roses	"I Am the Resurrection"	Yes	Yes	Unknown
1991	The Stone Roses	"I Wanna Be Adored"	Yes	Yes	Yes
1989	The Stone Roses	"She Bangs the Drums"	Yes	Yes	Yes
1989	The Stone Roses	"Waterfall"	Yes	Yes	Yes
1977	The Stranglers	"Peaches"	Yes	Yes	No
2005	The Subways	"Oh Yeah"	Yes	Yes	Yes
2005	The Subways	"Rock & Roll Queen"	Yes	Yes	Yes
1993	Suede	"Animal Nitrate"	Yes	Yes	Yes
1996	Suede	"Beautiful Ones"	Yes	Yes	Yes
1999	Suede	"Everything Will Flow"	Yes	Yes	Yes
1997	Suede	"Filmstar"	Yes	Yes	Yes
1997	Suede	"Lazy"	Yes	Yes	Yes
1992	Suede	"Metal Mickey"	Yes	Yes	Yes
1997	Suede	"Saturday Night"	Yes	Yes	Yes
1996	Suede	"Trash"	Yes	Yes	Yes
2007	Sugababes	"About You Now"	Yes	Yes	No
2005	Sugababes	"Push the Button"	Yes	Yes	No
2005	Sugababes	"Ugly"	Yes	Yes	No
2003	Sugababes	"Too Lost in You"	Yes	Yes	No
1993	Sultans of Ping FC	"Where's Me Jumper"	Yes	Yes	No
2008	Sunrise Avenue	"Choose to be Me"	Yes	Yes	Yes
2006	Sunrise Avenue	"Fairytale Gone Bad"	Yes	Yes	Yes
2007	Sunrise Avenue	"Forever Yours"	Yes	Yes	Yes
2007	Sunrise Avenue	"Heal Me"	Yes	Yes	Yes
2011	Sunrise Avenue	"Hollywood Hills"	Yes	Yes	Yes
2009	Sunrise Avenue	"Not Again"	Yes	Yes	Yes
2006	Sunrise Avenue	"Romeo"	Yes	Yes	Yes
2011	Sunrise Avenue	"Somebody Help Me"	Yes	Yes	Yes
2007	Superfamily	"I Could Be A Real Winner"	Yes	Yes	Yes
2005	Superfamily	"Taxi Dancing"	Unknown	Yes	Unknown
2007	Superfamily	"The Radio Has Expressed Concerns About What You Did Last Night"	Yes	Yes	Yes
1995	Supergrass	"Alright"	Yes	Yes	No
2007	Supergrass	"Diamond Hoo Ha Man"	Yes	Yes	Yes
1999	Supergrass	"Pumping on Your Stereo"	Yes	Yes	Yes
1997	Supergrass	"Richard III"	Yes	Yes	Yes
1997	Supergrass	"Sun Hits the Sky"	Yes	Yes	Yes
1965	The Supremes	"Santa Claus Is Comin' to Town"	Yes	Yes	No
1965	The Supremes	"Stop! In the Name of Love"	Yes	Yes	No
1966	The Supremes	"You Can't Hurry Love"	Yes	Yes	No
1965	The Supremes	"You Keep Me Hanging On"	Yes	Yes	No
2003	Surferosa	"Lucky Lipstick"	Yes	Yes	Yes
2004	Surferosa	"Saturday Night"	Yes	Yes	Yes
2007	Surferosa	"Royal Uniform"	Yes	Yes	Yes
1982	Survivor	"Eye of the Tiger"	Yes	Yes	Yes
2010	Susan Boyle	"Amazing Grace"	Yes	Yes	Yes
1987	Suzanne Vega	"Luka"	Yes	Yes	Yes
1987	Suzanne Vega	"Tom's Diner"	Yes	Yes	Yes
2012	Swedish House Mafia Feat. John Martin	"Don't You Worry Child"	Yes	Yes	Yes
1981	The Swingers	"Counting the Beat"	Yes	Yes	Yes
1987	T'Pau	"China in Your Hand"	Yes	Yes	Yes
1987	T'Pau	t"Heart And Soul"	Yes	Yes	Yes
1973	T.Rex	"20th Century Boy"	Yes	Yes	Yes
2009	Taio Cruz	"Break Your Heart"	Yes	Yes	Yes
2010	Taio Cruz	"Dirty Picture"	No	Yes	No
1983	Talking Heads	"Burning Down the House"	Yes	Yes	Yes
1984	Talk Talk	"It's My Life"	Yes	Yes	Yes
1984	Talk Talk	"Such a Shame"	Yes	Yes	Yes
1992	Take That	"A Million Love Songs"	Yes	Yes	No
1993	Take That	"Babe"	Yes	Yes	No
1995	Take That	"Back for Good"	Yes	Yes	No
1992	Take That	"Could It Be Magic"	Yes	Yes	No
1994	Take That	"Everything Changes"	Yes	Yes	No
2006	Take That	"Greatest Day"	Yes	Yes	No
2009	Take That	"Hold Up a Light"	Yes	Yes	No
2007	Take That	"I'd Wait for Life"	Yes	Yes	No
1992	Take That	"It Only Takes a Minute"	Yes	Yes	No
1994	Take That	"Love Ain't Here Anymore"	Yes	Yes	No
1995	Take That	"Never Forget"	Yes	Yes	No
2006	Take That	"Patience"	Yes	Yes	No
1993	Take That	"Pray"	Yes	Yes	No
1991	Take That	"Promises"	Yes	Yes	No
1993	Take That feat. Lulu	"Relight My Fire"	Yes	Yes	No
2007	Take That	"Rule the World"	Yes	Yes	No
2009	Take That	"Said It All"	Yes	Yes	No
2007	Take That	"Shine"	Yes	Yes	No
1994	Take That	"Sure"	Yes	Yes	No
2009	Take That	"The Garden"	Yes	Yes	No
1988	Tanita Tikaram	"Twist In My Sobriety"	Yes	Yes	Yes
1985	Tears For Fears	"Everybody Wants To Rule The World"	Yes	Yes	Unknown
1985	Tears For Fears	"Head over Heels"	Yes	Yes	Unknown
1982	Tears For Fears	"Mad World"	Yes	Yes	No
1982	Tears For Fears	"Pale Shelter"	Yes	Yes	No
1984	Tears For Fears	"Shout"	Yes	Yes	No
1989	Tears For Fears	"Sowing the Seeds of Love"	Yes	Yes	No
1989	Tears For Fears	"Woman in Chains"	Yes	Yes	No
1972	The Temptations	"Papa Was a Rollin' Stone"	Yes	Yes	Yes
2008	The Temper Trap	"Sweet Disposition"	Yes	Yes	Yes
1991	Ten Sharp	"You"	Yes	Yes	Yes
1987	Terence Trent D'Arby	"If You Let Me Stay"	Yes	Yes	Yes
1987	Terence Trent D'Arby	"Sign Your Name"	Yes	Yes	Yes
1987	Terence Trent D'Arby	"Wishing Well"	Yes	Yes	Yes
1997	Texas	"Black Eyed Boy"	Yes	Yes	No
1997	Texas	"Halo"	Yes	Yes	No
1997	Texas	"Say What You Want"	Yes	Yes	No
1999	Texas	"Summer Son"	Yes	Yes	No
1993	Things Of Stone and Wood	"Happy Birthday Helen"	Yes	Yes	Unknown
1984	Thompson Twins	"Hold Me Now"	Yes	Yes	Yes
2003	The Thrills	"One Horse Town"	Yes	Yes	Yes
2003	The Thrills	"Santa Cruz (You're Not That Far)"	Yes	Yes	Yes
1987	Tiffany	"I Think We're Alone Now"	Yes	Yes	Unknown
2008	Tiki Taane	"Always on my Mind"	Yes	Yes	Yes
2007	Timbaland feat. OneRepublic	"Apologize"	Yes	Yes	Yes
1989	Tina Turner	"The Best"	Yes	Yes	Yes
1993	Tina Turner	"I Don't Wanna Fight"	Yes	Yes	Yes
1984	Tina Turner	"Private Dancer"	Yes	Yes	Yes
1990	Tina Turner	"Steamy Windows"	Yes	Yes	Yes
1985	Tina Turner	"We Don't Need Another Hero"	Yes	Yes	Yes
1984	Tina Turner	"What's Love Got to Do with It"	Yes	Yes	Yes
2009	Tinchy Stryder feat. Amelle	"Never Leave You"	Yes	Yes	No
2009	Tinchy Stryder feat. N-Dubz	"Number 1"	Yes	Yes	No
2008	The Ting Tings	"Great DJ"	Yes	Yes	Yes
2008	The Ting Tings	"Shut Up and Let Me Go"	Yes	Yes	Yes
2008	The Ting Tings	"That's Not My Name"	Yes	Yes	Yes
2010	Tinie Tempah	"Pass Out"	Yes	Yes	No
2004	Titiyo	"Come Along"	Yes	Yes	Yes
2002	Tocotronic	"This Boy is Tocotronic"	Yes	Yes	Yes
1965	Tom Jones	"It's Not Unusual"	Yes	Yes	No
1971	Tom Jones	"She's a Lady"	Yes	Yes	No
1965	Tom Jones	"What's New Pussycat?"	Yes	Yes	No
1989	Tone Loc	"Funky Cold Medina"	Yes	Yes	Yes
1988	Tone Loc	"Wild Thing"	Yes	Yes	Yes
2001	Toni Braxton	"Have Yourself a Merry Little Christmas"	Yes	Yes	Yes
1996	Toni Braxton	"Un-Break My Heart"	Yes	Yes	Yes
2000	Toploader	"Dancing in the Moonlight"	Yes	Yes	Yes
1982	Toto	"Africa"	Yes	Yes	Yes
1978	Toto	"Hold the Line"	Yes	Yes	Yes
1982	Toto	"Rosanna"	Yes	Yes	Yes
1988	Toto	"Stop Loving You"	Yes	Yes	Yes
1976	The Trammps	"Disco Inferno"	Yes	Yes	Yes
1989	Transvision Vamp	"Baby I Don't Care"	Yes	Yes	No
1999	Travis	"Driftwood (single)"	Yes	Yes	No
2002	Travis	"Flowers in the Window"	Yes	Yes	Yes
2001	Travis	"Sing"	Yes	Yes	Yes
2008	Travis	"Something Anything"	Yes	Yes	Yes
1999	Travis	"Why Does It Always Rain On Me?"	Yes	Yes	No
1986	Trio Rio	"New York, Rio, Tokyo"	Yes	Yes	Yes
1966	The Troggs	"Wild Thing"	Yes	Yes	Yes
2005	Turbonegro	"High on the Crime"	Yes	Yes	No
1984	Twisted Sister	"We're Not Gonna Take It"	Yes	Yes	Yes
1987	U2	"I Still Haven't Found What I'm Looking For"	Yes	Yes	Yes
1984	U2	"Pride (In the Name of Love)"	Yes	Yes	Yes
1987	U2	"With or Without You"	Yes	Yes	Yes
1987	UB40	"Rat in Mi Kitchen"	Yes	Yes	Yes
1983	UB40	"Red Red Wine"	Yes	Yes	Yes
2003	Ultrabeat	"Feelin' Fine"	Yes	Yes	No
1984	Ultravox	"Love's Great Adventure"	Yes	Yes	Yes
1980	Ultravox	"Vienna"	Yes	Yes	Yes
1978	The Undertones	"Teenage Kicks"	Yes	Yes	Yes
2013	Union J	"Carry You"	Yes	Yes	Yes
2006	US5	"365 Days"	Yes	Yes	Unknown
2006	US5	"Come Back To Me Baby"	Yes	Yes	Unknown
2006	US5	"In The Club"	Yes	Yes	Unknown
2005	US5	"Just Because of You"	Yes	Yes	Unknown
2006	US5	"Mama"	Yes	Yes	Unknown
2005	US5	"Maria"	Yes	Yes	Unknown
2007	US5	"Rhythm of Life"	Yes	Yes	Unknown
2008	Vampire Weekend	"A-Punk"	Yes	Yes	Yes
2008	Vampire Weekend	"Oxford Comma"	Yes	Yes	Yes
1987	Vaya Con Dios	"Just A Friend of Mine"	Yes	Yes	Unknown
1992	Vaya Con Dios	"Time Flies"	Yes	Yes	Unknown
1985	The Velvet Underground	"I'm Sticking With You"	Yes	Yes	No
2005	The Veronicas	"4ever"	Yes	Yes	Yes
2007	The Veronicas	"Hook Me Up"	Yes	Yes	Yes
1978	Village People	"Y.M.C.A."	Yes	Yes	No
2007	Vincent	"Don't Hate On Me"	Yes	Yes	Unknown
2002	The Vines	"Get Free"	Yes	Yes	Yes
2004	The Vines	"Ride"	Yes	Yes	Yes
2006	Von Hertzen Brothers	"Let Thy Will Be Done"	Yes	Yes	No
2010	The Wanted	"All Time Low"	Yes	Yes	Yes
2011	The Wanted	"Glad You Came"	Yes	Yes	Yes
2011	The Wanted	"Lightning"	Yes	Yes	Yes
2010	The Wanted	"Lose My Mind"	Yes	Yes	Yes
1990	Warrant	"Cherry Pie"	Yes	Yes	Yes
1983	The Weather Girls	"It's Raining Men"	Yes	Yes	Yes
1995	Weezer	"Perfect Situation"	Yes	Yes	Yes
1985	"Weird Al" Yankovic	"Like a Surgeon"	Yes	Yes	Yes
2008	Wes Carr	"You"	Yes	Yes	Unknown
2002	Westlife	"Bop Bop Baby"	Yes	Yes	Yes
1999	Westlife	"Flying Without Wings"	Yes	Yes	Yes
1999	Westlife	"Fool Again"	Yes	Yes	Yes
1999	Westlife	"If I Let You Go"	Yes	Yes	Yes
2003	Westlife	"Mandy"	Yes	Yes	Yes
2001	Westlife	"Queen of my Heart"	Yes	Yes	Yes
2006	Westlife	"The Rose"	Yes	Yes	Yes
2002	Westlife	"Unbreakable"	Yes	Yes	Yes
2001	Westlife	"Uptown Girl"	Yes	Yes	Yes
2001	Westlife	"World of Our Own"	Yes	Yes	Yes
1994	Wet Wet Wet	"Love Is All Around"	Yes	Yes	Yes
1983	Wham!	"Club Tropicana"	Yes	Yes	Yes
1985	Wham!	"Last Christmas"	Yes	Yes	Yes
1985	Wham!	"Wake Me Up Before You Go-Go"	Yes	Yes	Yes
1985	Whitney Houston	"Greatest Love of All"	Yes	Yes	Yes
1999	Whitney Houston	"It's Not Right but It's Okay"	Yes	Yes	Yes
1987	Whitney Houston	"I Wanna Dance with Somebody (Who Loves Me)"	Yes	Yes	Yes
1990	Whitney Houston	"I'm Your Baby Tonight"	Yes	Yes	Yes
1999	Whitney Houston	"My Love Is Your Love"	Yes	Yes	Yes
1988	Whitney Houston	"One Moment in Time"	Yes	Yes	Yes
1987	Whitney Houston	"So Emotional"	Yes	Yes	Yes
1987	Whitney Houston	"Where Do Broken Hearts Go"	Yes	Yes	Yes
2008	Will Young	"Changes"	Yes	Yes	Yes
2008	Will Young	"Grace"	Yes	Yes	Yes
	Will Young	"Oh Yeah"	Yes	Yes	Yes
2005	Will Young	"Switch It On"	Yes	Yes	Yes
2007	will.i.am	"I Got It from My Mama"	Yes	Yes	No
2008	will.i.am feat. Cheryl Cole	"Heartbreaker"	Yes	Yes	No
1990	Wilson Phillips	"Hold On"	Yes	Yes	Yes
1973	Wings	"Band on the Run"	Yes	Yes	Yes
1976	Wings	"Let 'Em In"	Yes	Yes	Yes
1977	Wings	"Mull of Kintyre"	Yes	Yes	Yes
1976	Wings	"Silly Love Songs"	Yes	Yes	Unknown
1973	Wizzard	"I Wish It Could Be Christmas Everyday"	Yes	Yes	Yes
2006	Wolfmother	"Love Train"	Yes	Yes	No
2006	Wolfmother	"Woman"	Yes	Yes	No
2007	The Wombats	"Backfire at the Disco"	Yes	Yes	Yes
2008	The Wombats	"Moving to New York"	Yes	Yes	Yes
1974	The Wombles	"Wombling Merry Christmas"	Yes	Yes	Yes
2006	X-Wife	"Ping Pong"	Yes	Yes	Yes
1982	Yazoo	"Don't Go"	Yes	Yes	Unknown
1982	Yazoo	"Only You"	Yes	Yes	No
1988	Yazz And The Plastic Population	"The Only Way Is Up"	Unknown	Yes	Unknown
2006	Yeah Yeah Yeahs	"Gold Lion"	Yes	Yes	No
2009	Yeah Yeah Yeahs	"Heads Will Roll"	Yes	Yes	No
2009	Yeah Yeah Yeahs	"Zero"	Yes	Yes	No
2014	Years & Years	"Desire"	Yes	Yes	Yes
2009	Yohanna	"Is It True?"	Yes	Yes	No
1993	You Am I	"Berlin Chair"	Yes	Yes	Yes
1995	You Am I	"Purple Sneakers"	Yes	Yes	Yes
2004	Zornik	"Scared Of Yourself"	Yes	Yes	No
2006	The Zutons	"Oh Stacey (Look What You've Done!)"	Yes	Yes	Yes
2006	The Zutons	"Valerie"	Yes	Yes	Yes
2006	The Zutons	"Why Won't You Give Me Your Love?"	Yes	Yes	Yes
2006	The Zutons	"You Will You Won't"	Yes	Yes	Yes
