= Keep Calm and Carry On (album) =

Album by Stereophonics

Studio album by Stereophonics
- Released: 16 November 2009
- Recorded: Mid–late 2008 at: State of the Ark, Rak, London; Westpoint Studios, London
- Genres: Rock; alternative rock; pop rock
- Length: 45:09
- Labels: V2; Mercury
- Producers: Kelly Jones; Jim Abbiss; Jim Lowe

Stereophonics chronology
Decade in the Sun: Best of Stereophonics (2008)	Keep Calm and Carry On (2009)	Graffiti on the Train (2013)

Singles from Keep Calm and Carry On
- 1. "Innocent" Released: 9 November 2009; 2. "Could You Be the One?" Released: 15 February 2010

Keep Calm and Carry On is the seventh studio album by Welsh rock band Stereophonics. Released by Mercury on 16 November 2009, the album debuted at number 11 with sales of 42,771 on the UK Albums Chart, the lowest position for a studio album released by the band. The album was named after a British World War II poster of the same name. Keep Calm and Carry On was the first studio album by the band to feature guitarist Adam Zindani as a permanent member of the band. In the initial months after release, fans could access bonus content from the band's website with their copy of the album. This featured videos of a Track By Track rundown of the album, a Welcome Message from the group, the photoshoot for the album, and live audio of "You're My Star" (Acoustic) and "I Stopped to Fill My Car Up" from the Greatest Hits tour.

== Release ==
Region	Date
United Kingdom	16 November 2009
Taiwan	5 February 2010
Germany	26 February 2010
United States	11 May 2010

== Reception ==
Professional ratings
Aggregate scores
Source	Rating
AnyDecentMusic?	5.3/10
Metacritic	59/100
Review scores
Source	Rating
AllMusic	3/5 stars
Drowned in Sound	4/10
Daily Express	3/5 stars
The Guardian	3/5 stars
Guitarist	3/5 stars
musicOMH	3/5 stars
Mojo	4/5 stars
Q	3/5 stars
The Times	4/5 stars
Uncut	4/5 stars

Critical reception of the album was generally mixed. At Metacritic, which assigns a normalized rating out of 100 to reviews from mainstream critics, the album has received an average score of 59, based on 8 reviews. The Sunday Times called it "their best album yet" but BBC critic Will Dean wrote "musically it's as solid as you'd expect [...] [b]ut Keep Calm... is unlikely to win Stereophonics any new fans," while Andy Gill, for The Independent, concluded that "overall, what comes across from Keep Calm and Carry On is confusion."

== Track listing ==
All tracks are written by Kelly Jones

No.	Title	Length
1.	"She's Alright"	3:27
2.	"Innocent"	3:41
3.	"Beerbottle"	3:54
4.	"Trouble"	3:04
5.	"Could You Be the One?"	3:52
6.	"I Got Your Number"	3:22
7.	"Uppercut"	4:16
8.	"Live 'n' Love"	3:45
9.	"100mph"	4:15
10.	"Wonder"	3:44
11.	"Stuck in a Rut"	3:07
12.	"Show Me How"	4:42

Japanese release bonus tracks
No.	Title	Length
13.	"Innocent" (live)	4:03
14.	"I Stopped to Fill My Car Up" (live)	6:49
15.	"You're My Star" (live)	6:05

== Deluxe edition CD/DVD ==
Keep Calm and Carry On (Deluxe Edition)

Video by Stereophonics
- Released: 16 November 2009
- Genres: Rock music, Indie

This deluxe edition of Keep Calm and Carry On, as well as containing the actual album, houses additional pictures and a bonus DVD. The DVD gives a backstage look into the Decade in the Sun: The Best of Stereophonics tour, and also footage of the recording process for the album. Hidden live content from Riverside Studios (originally only showcased online by Babelgum) and the Isle of Wight Festival 2009 is also included

=== Track listing ===
1. Keep Calm and Carry On - In the Studio
2. Just Looking - Behind the Scenes of the 2008 Greatest Hits Arena Tour

=== Hidden Content ===
1. Live at Riverside Studios
2. "Innocent" (Isle of Wight Festival 2009)

== Personnel ==
Stereophonics

- Kelly Jones – lead vocals, guitar
- Richard Jones – bass
- Adam Zindani – guitar, backing vocals
- Javier Weyler – drums

Additional

- Niel Cowley – piano, Wurlitzer, organ on track 2, 3, 4, 12
- Jim Abbiss – piano, percussion on track 1. Piano on track 2. Organ on track 3, 4, 5. Synthesizer on track 3. Vibraphone on track 5.
- Arnulf Lindner – cello on track 12

Technical personnel

- Production – Kelly Jones, Jim Abbiss
- Production on track 7 – Jones
- Production on track 8, 9 – Jones, Jim Lowe
- Mixing – Barny Barnicott
- Additional mixing – Lowe
- Mixing on track 9 – Lowe
- Engineering – Jonathan Shakhovskoy
- Additional Engineering – Tom Hough, Helen Atkinson, Ian Sherwin
- Mastering – John Davis

== Charts and certifications ==
Album charts (weekly)
Chart (2009)	Peak
UK Albums Chart	11
Irish Albums Chart	32

Singles chart (weekly)
Year	Title	Peak
Year	Title	UK
2009	Innocent	54
2010	Could You Be the One?	-

Certifications
Region	Certification	Certified units/sales
United Kingdom (BPI)	Gold	165,000
