= Could You Be the One? (Stereophonics song) =

Single by Stereophonics

from the album Keep Calm and Carry On
- Released: 15 February 2010
- Recorded: 2009
- Genre: Rock
- Length: 3:52
- Label: Mercury
- Songwriter: Kelly Jones

Stereophonics singles chronology
"Innocent" (2009)	"Could You Be the One?" (2010)	"In a Moment" (2012)

Music video
- "Could You Be the One?" on YouTube

"Could You Be the One?" is a single by Welsh rock band Stereophonics which was released on 15 February 2010. It is the second single taken from their seventh studio album, Keep Calm and Carry On. It failed to chart in the UK, their first single to do so.

Talking about the track, singer Kelly Jones says: "I knew there was something in the melody. I was trying to keep it beautiful rather than piling in for a big chorus."

== Track listing ==
Digital download

1. "Could You Be the One?" (3:52)
