= Quiet Exit =

Studio album by Elvira Nikolaisen
- Released: 6 March 2006
- Genre: Pop
- Label: Columbia
- Producer: Knut Schreiner

Elvira Nikolaisen chronology
Quiet Exit (2006)	Indian Summer (2008)

Singles from Quiet Exit
- 1. "Love I Can't Defend" Released: 2005; 2. "Egypt Song" Released: 2006

Quiet Exit is the 2006 debut album of Norwegian singer-songwriter Elvira Nikolaisen. The album contains twelve songs written by Nikolaisen. The album sold over fifty thousand copies in 2006, making it the 14th most sold album in Norway that year.

== Production ==
The album was produced by Knut Schreiner, better known as Euroboy, lead guitarist of Turbonegro, and lead singer/guitarist of Euroboys, enlisting fellow Euroboys guitarist Trond Mjøen to accompany on electric/acoustic guitars, while Tom Rudi Torjussen of Jim Stärk plays drums/percussion. Ole Kristian Wetten plays bass. Nikolaisen's older brother, Emil Nikolaisen, of Serena Maneesh also contributed, by providing background vocals on three of the songs. All the lyrics and melodies were written by Nikolaisen.Recording took place in Athletic Sound Studio in Halden and finished in September 2005.

Several reviewers commented positively on the album's production. One reviewer complimented Schreiner and the backing band for the "many exciting details in the soundscape, that reveals something new every time you listen to the songs". Thorstein Krogedahl also received praise for his performance on background saxophone in the chorus of Egypt Song.

== Release and reception ==
Professional ratings
Review scores
Source	Rating
Aftenposten	5/6 stars
Dagbladet	5/6 stars
Verdens Gang	5/6 stars

The album's lead single, "Love I Can't Defend", released in late 2005, was a success, peaking at No. 3 on the Norwegian airplay chart, making Quiet Exit one of the most anticipated albums of 2006. At the release concert, Nikolaisen said: "Quiet Exit is a result of many years of passionate work." The album was released on 6 March 2006, the same day as another much anticipated debut album, Marit Larsen's Under the Surface. An article in Verdens Gang written by Thomas Talseth described the simultaneous release as the peak of a "girl war", referring to the large number of Norwegian female artists making their record debuts in early 2006. The article sparked some controversy. Several music journalists and artists criticized Talseth for his use of the term "girl war". However, Talseth later defended his use of the term, calling it a "nice tabloid angle".

The album was well received by critics. In his review for Verdens Gang, Talseth gave it 5 out of 6. Dagbladet's reviewer also gave it 5/6, calling the album "comfortable and beautiful music that deserves many listeners", characterizing Nikolaisen as a "female crooner". Another reviewer praised Nikolaisen for her "soulful voice". The album went straight to the No. 2 spot on the Norwegian album chart, only beaten by David Gilmour's On an Island, and remained on the list for 34 consecutive weeks.

The album's second single, "Egypt Song", was also successful, capturing the top spot on the Norwegian airplay chart. Per 29 June 2007, it was the second most played song on NRK P1, Norway's largest radio station. The song spent 18 consecutive weeks on the Norwegian singles chart, peaking at No. 6.

Nikolaisen received three Spelemann-nominations for the album: "Best Female Artist", "Newcomer of the Year", and "Hit of the Year" (for "Love I Can't Defend").

== Track listing ==
"Egypt Song" (2006)
"Egypt Song" was the most played song on Norwegian radio in early 2007.

#	Title	Time
1	"Love I Can't Defend"	3:30
2	"Quiet Exit"	3:08
3	"Habit"	4:02
4	"Egypt Song"	3:17
5	"Not My Place"	4:29
6	"Sweet, Sweet"	5:29
7	"Carpenter"	3:02
8	"My Way Back In"	3:38
9	"Scarecrow"	4:14
10	"Troops"	4:46
11	"Disheartening"	5:04
12	"Everything Reminds Me Of You"	3:54
