= Elvira Nikolaisen =

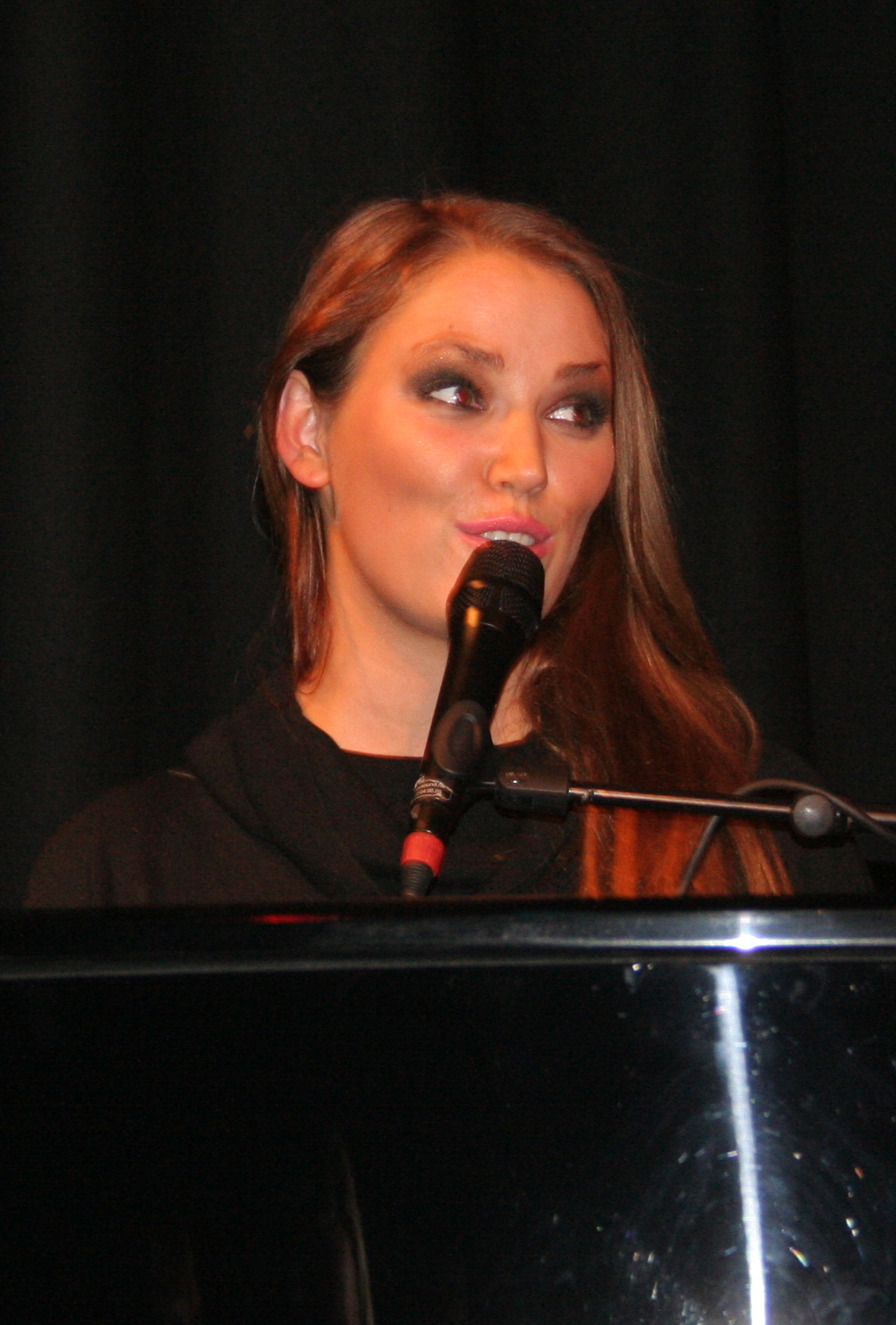
- Elvira Nikolaisen performing on 7 June 2007 at the Paradiso, Amsterdam.

Background information
- Born: 16 July 1980 (age 45)
- Origin: Moi, Norway
- Genres: Pop
- Occupation: Singer–songwriter
- Instruments: vocals, piano
- Years active: 2005–present
- Label: Columbia Records / Sony Music

Elvira Nikolaisen (born 16 July 1980 in Moi) is a Norwegian singer-songwriter signed for Sony BMG. She released her debut single Love I Can't Defend in December 2005, it reached the number 3 spot on the Norwegian singles list. She followed up the hit with her first album, Quiet Exit, and a second single, Egypt Song, in March 2006. The album peaked at No. 2 in the Norwegian chart.

== Career ==
Nikolaisen is from a musical family, her father is a church organist and her brother Emil is the vocalist and guitarist for Serena Maneesh, and her sister Hilma is the bassist for the same band. Her brother Ivar is lead singer of the Norwegian punk band Silver. In 1998, Nikolaisen with her brother Emil fronted the independent band Royal. The band released one album titled My Dear on Soulscape Records and distributed through Tooth and Nail Records. While she's from a very religious family, Nikolaisen rejected her Christian beliefs at the age of eighteen. Some of her lyrics reflect the impact of this change on her life.

Nikolaisen released her second album, Indian Summer in April 2008. However, she failed to repeat the success of the debut album, Quiet Exit. On the latest album I Concentrate on You (2013) Nikolaisen in collaboration with the Jaga Jazzist trumpeter Mathias Eick, moves into American popular music, fulfilling her old dream to go into the great American songbook. Other contributors on this album are Ola Kvernberg (violin, viola & bass-violin), Andreas Ulvo (piano, cembalo, celesta) and Gard Nilssen (drums).

== Discography ==
=== Albums ===
Year	Album	Peak positions	Certification
Year	Album	NOR	Certification
2006	Quiet Exit	2	
2009	Indian Summer	13	
2011	Lighthouse	25	
2013	I Concentrate on You	11	

=== Singles ===
Year	Single	Peak positions	Album
Year	Single	NOR	Album
2006	"Love I Can't Defend"	3	Quiet Exit
2006	"Egypt Song"	6	Quiet Exit
