= Innocent (Stereophonics song) =

Single by Stereophonics

from the album Keep Calm and Carry On
- Released: 9 November 2009
- Recorded: 2009
- Genre: Rock
- Length: 3:41
- Label: Mercury
- Songwriter: Kelly Jones
- Producers: Kelly Jones; Jim Abbiss

Stereophonics singles chronology
"You're My Star" (2008)	"Innocent" (2009)	"Could You Be the One?" (2010)

Music video
- "Innocent" on YouTube

"Innocent" is a single by Welsh rock band Stereophonics which was released on 9 November 2009. It was the first single taken from their seventh studio album, Keep Calm and Carry On, which was released a week later, on 16 November 2009. It was also the band's first single for Mercury Records.

== Track listings ==
All tracks are written by Kelly Jones

Digital download
No.	Title	Length
1.	"Innocent"	4:05

All tracks are written by Kelly Jones

CD single
No.	Title	Length
1.	"Innocent"
2.	"I Stopped To Fill Up My Car" (live)
3.	"Innocent" (live)
4.	"Innocent" (video)

All lyrics are written by Kelly Jones; all music is composed by Kelly Jones, Adam Zindani

7" vinyl
No.	Title	Length
1.	"Innocent"
2.	"You're My Star" (live)

- Note: The physical CD and vinyl formats were subsequently cancelled.

== Music video ==
The music video for "Innocent" premiered on the group's YouTube account on 5 October 2009.

== Personnel ==
Stereophonics

- Kelly Jones – lead vocalist, guitar
- Richard Jones – bass
- Adam Zindani – guitar, backing vocals
- Javier Weyler – drums

Additional

- Niel Cowley – piano, Wurlitzer, organ
- Jim Abbiss – piano

Technical personnel

- Production – Kelly Jones, Jim Abbiss
- Mixing – Barny Barnicott
- Additional mixing – Jim Lowe
- Engineering – Jonathan Shakhovskoy
- Additional Engineering – Tom Hough, Helen Atkinson, Ian Sherwin
- Mastering – John Davis

== Charts ==
Singles charts (weekly)
Chart (2009)	Peak
UK Albums Chart	54

Singles charts (weekly)
Chart (2010)	Peak
Belgium Albums Chart (Flanders)	30
