= Hanna Pakarinen discography =

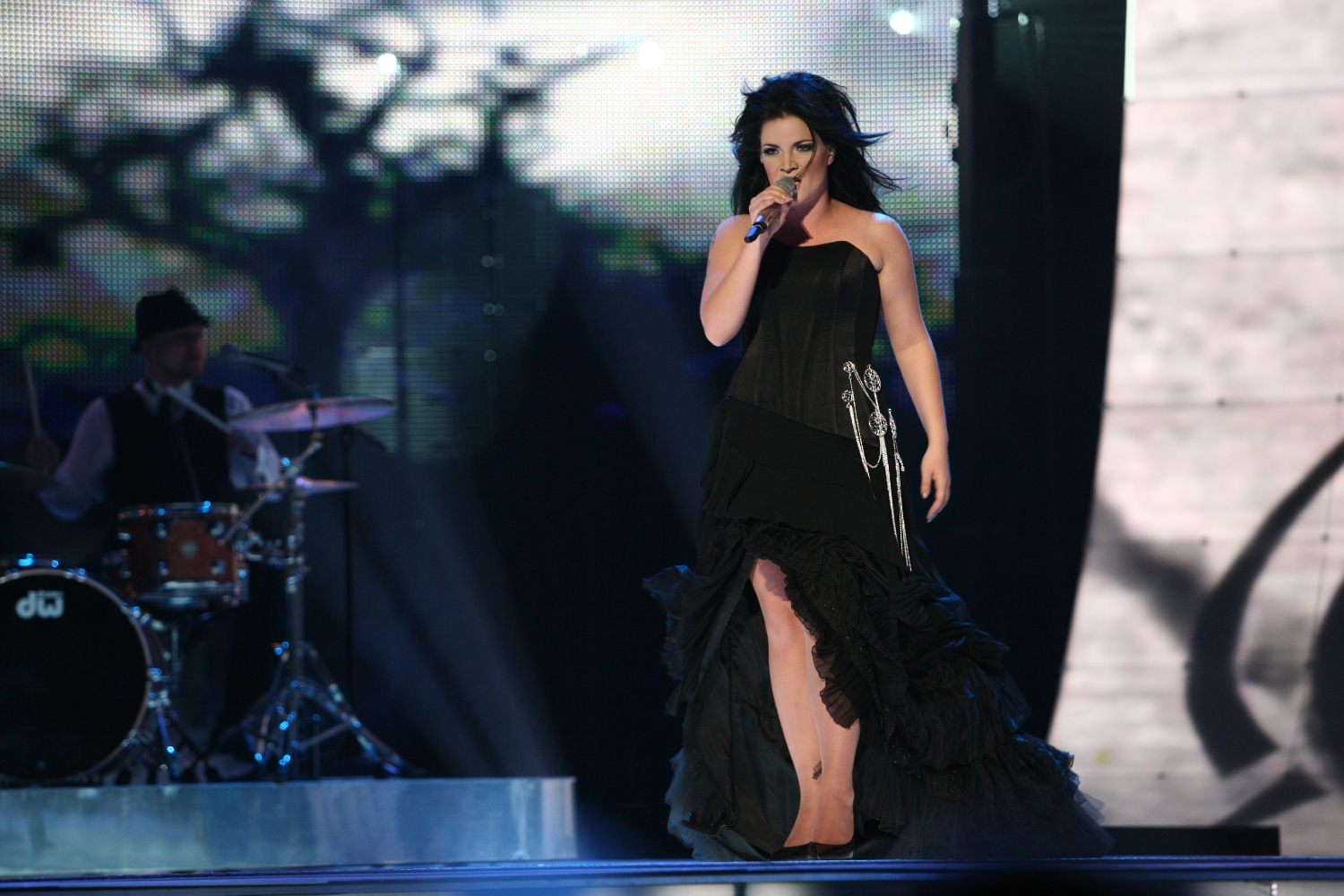
- Pakarinen performing "Leave Me Alone" at the finals of the 2007 Eurovision Song Contest
- Studio albums: 6
- Singles: 15
- Music videos: 6
- B-sides: 5
- Miscellaneous: 1
- Collaborations: 1
- Tours: 4

The following is the complete discography of Finnish pop/rock singer Hanna Pakarinen.

== Albums ==
Year	Information	Finland	Sales and Certifications
2004	When I Become Me: First studio album; Released: 16 June 2004; Label: RCA Records; Format: CD, digital download	2	^{Finnish sales: 52,826 IFPI: Platinum}
2005	Stronger: Second studio album; Released: 7 September 2005; Label: RCA Records; Format: CD, digital download	2	^{Finnish sales: 16,473 IFPI: Gold}
2007	Lovers: Third studio album; Released: 14 February 2007; Label: RCA Records; Format: CD, digital download	3	^{Finnish sales: 16,163 IFPI: Gold}
2009	Love In A Million Shades: Fourth studio album; Release: 14 January 2009; Label: RCA Records; Format: CD, digital download	7	^{Finnish sales: 7,000 IFPI: N/A}
2010	Paperimiehen Tytär: Fifth studio album; First Finnish-language album; Release: 20 October 2010; Label: RCA Records; Format: CD, digital download	9	^{Finnish sales: 3,000 IFPI: N/A}
2013	Olipa kerran elämä: Sixth studio album; Second Finnish-language album; Release: 26 August 2013; Label: RCA Records; Format: CD, digital download	9	^{Finnish sales: IFPI: N/A}
2016	Synnyin, elän, kuolen: Seventh studio album; Third Finnish-language album; Release: 9 September 2016; Label: RCA Records; Format: CD, digital download	11	

== Singles ==
Year	Title	Chart positions				Certification	Album
Year	Title	FIN	FIN DIG	SWE	UK	Certification	Album
2004	"Love Is Like A Song"	1	—	—	—	Gold	When I Become Me
2004	"Fearless"	Promo	—	—	—	—	When I Become Me
2004	"How Can I Miss You"	Promo	—	—	—	—	When I Become Me
2004	"When I Become Me"	Promo	—	—	—	—	When I Become Me
2005	"Kiss Of Life"	4	—	—	—	—	Stronger
2005	"Stronger Without You"	Promo	—	—	—	—	Stronger
2005	"Damn You"	Promo	—	—	—	—	Stronger
2007	"Go Go"	Promo	13	—	—	—	Lovers
2007	"Leave Me Alone"	11	11	8	122	Gold	Lovers
2007	"Hard Luck Woman"	Promo	—	—	—	—	Lovers
2007	"Black Ice"	Promo	—	—	—	—	Soundtrack
2008	"Make Believe"	Promo	—	—	—	—	Love In A Million Shades
2009	"Shout It Out Loud"	2	—	—	—	—	Love In A Million Shades
2009	"Love In A Million Shades"	Promo	—	—	—	—	Love In A Million Shades
2009	"Rescue Me"	Promo	—	—	—	—	Love In A Million Shades
2010	"Paperimiehen Tytär"	Promo	—	—	—	—	Paperimiehen Tytär
2010	"Se Yksi Ainoa"	Promo	—	—	—	—	Paperimiehen Tytär
2010	"Miehet"	Promo	—	—	—	—	Paperimiehen Tytär
2012	"Sydän tuli vastaan"	Promo	—	—	—	—	Olipa Kerran Elämä
2013	"Jokapäiväinen"	Promo	—	—	—	—	Olipa Kerran Elämä
2013	"Olipa Kerran Elämä"	Promo	—	—	—	—	Olipa Kerran Elämä

== Music videos ==
Year	Video Title	Album
2004	How Can I Miss You	When I Become Me
2005	Stronger Without You	Stronger
2007	Go Go	Lovers
2007	Leave Me Alone	Lovers
2007	Black Ice	Soundtrack Only
2009	Love in a Million Shades	Love in a Million Shades

== Featured musician ==
- 2007 feat. Eicca Toppinen the song Black Ice from Musta Jää (Black Ice) soundtrack.
- 2007 feat. Michelle Darkness the song Love Will Tear Us Apart from the Album Brand new Drug.
- 2008 feat. Apocalyptica the song S.O.S (Anything But Love) live at Emma-gaala on 8 March 2008.

== Album track listings ==
=== When I Become Me (2004) ===
1. "When I Become Me" (Sarin) - 5:03
2. "Run" (Elofsson/Thornally/Venge/Wennerberg) - 3:12
3. "Fearless" (Finneide/Rydningen/Ziggy) - 3:21
4. "How Can I Miss You" (Röhr/Swede) - 3:59
5. "Ejected" (Asikainen) - 3:42
6. "Love's Run Over Me" (Asikainen) - 4:44
7. "Don't Hang Up" (Nylén/Rose) - 3:51
8. "Save My Life Tonight" (Fridh/Leonard) - 4:25
9. "Sorry" (Björk/Malm/Eklund) - 3:46
10. "Heaven" (Adams/Vallance) - 3:53
11. "Superhero" (Finneide/Eide) - 3:42
12. "Love Is Like A Song" (Elofson/Kolehmainen/Lipp) - 4:02

=== Stronger (2005) ===
1. "Out Of Tears" (Aldeheim/Leonard) - 3:25
2. "Stronger Without You" (Landin/Larsson/Junior) - 3:27
3. "Wasted" (Elofson/Kvint/Lindvall) - 3:32
4. "Falling Again" (Eklund/Björk/Malm) - 3:42
5. "Tears In Your Eyes" (Eriksson/Molin/Funemyr) - 3:55
6. "We Don't Speak" (Hansson) - 3:41
7. "Damn You" (Ringqvist/Gibson) - 4:17
8. "Kiss Of Life" (Johansson/Lipp) - 4:00
9. "Paralyzed" (Eriksson/Björk) - 3:57
10. "One Way Or The Other" (Björk/Eklund/Krabbe) - 3:18
11. "Run (Acoustic Studio Jam 2005)" (Elofsson/Thornally/Venge/Wennerberg) - 3:56 [Bonus Track]

=== Lovers (2007) ===
1. "It Ain't Me" (Magnusson/Rämström/Vuorinen) - 3:35
2. "Go Go" (Lofts/Wermerling) - 3:03
3. "Leave Me Alone" (Vuorinen/Huttunen/Pakarinen) - 3:34
4. "Tell Me What To Do" (Kurki/Pakarinen) - 3:53>
5. "You Don't Even Know My Name" (Laine/Vuorinen) - 3:43
6. "Heart Beating Steady" (Kurki/Pakarinen) - 3:24
7. "Tears You Cry" (Korkeamäki/Kettunen) - 3:05
8. "Free" (Kurki/Pakarinen) - 3:33
9. "It Ain't Gonna Happen" (Korkeamäki/Pakarinen/Kettunen) - 3:09
10. "Lovers" (Laiho/Kurki/Pakarinen) - 3:48
11. "Hard Luck Woman" (Rake) - 4:18
12. "Stronger Without You" (Landin/Larsson/Junior) - 3:27 [Bonus Track]
13. "Love Is Like A Song" (Elofson/Kolehmainen/Lipp) - 4:02 [Bonus Track]

=== Love In A Million Shades (2009) ===
1. "Almost Real"
2. "Shout It Out Loud"
3. "When We Hear Halleluja"
4. "Liar"
5. "Rescue Me"
6. "A Thief That Holds My Heart"
7. "Love In A Million Shades"
8. "Make Believe"
9. "Lover Friend Or Foe"
10. "Maybe It's A Good Thing"
11. "Better Off Alone" (iTunes Bonus Track)
