= Idols (Finnish TV series) =

Finnish reality television program

- Created by: Simon Fuller
- Presented by: Heikki Paasonen (2003–2005, 2008–2018); Ellen Jokikunnas (2003–2008); Jani Toivola (2007); Niina Backman (2011–2012)
- Judges: Jone Nikula (2003–2013, 2018); Asko Kallonen (2003–2004, 2007); Hannu Korkeamäki (2003–2004); Nanna Mikkonen (2003–2004); Nina Tapio (2005–2011); Kim Kuusi (2005); Jarkko Valtee (2005); Patric Sarin (2008); Sami Pitkämö (2011); Laura Voutilainen (2012); Tommi Liimatainen (2012); Sini Sabotage (2013, 2018); Jussi 69 (2013, 2018); Lauri Ylönen (2013, 2018); Antti Tuisku (2017); Erin (2017); Jurek Reunamäki (2017)
- No. of seasons: 9

Production
- Production locations: National Opera House, Helsinki (2003–2008); Helsinki Ice Hall, Helsinki (finale) (2003–2008); Hartwall Arena, Helsinki (finale) (2011–2018)
- Running time: Auditions/Performance show 60–90 minutes Elimination show 30 minutes (Both shows include commercials)

Original release
- Network: MTV3
- Release: 26 September 2003 – 30 November 2018

Idols is a Finnish reality-television singing competition that airs on Nelonen (and formerly also on MTV3 and Sub). It debuted in the summer of 2003, and went on to become one of the most popular shows on Finnish television. Part of the Idol franchise, it originated from the reality program Pop Idol created by British entertainment executive Simon Fuller, which was first aired in 2001 in the United Kingdom.

The program seeks to discover the best unsigned singer in Finland through a series of nationwide auditions, and the outcomes of the later stages of the competition are determined by public phone voting.

The four original judges were music executives Jone Nikula and Asko Kallonen, and songwriter-producers Hannu Korkeamäki and Nanna Mikkonen. The current judging panel consists of Nikula, singer Lauri Ylönen, drummer Jussi 69 and rapper Sini Sabotage. The show is hosted by television presenter Heikki Paasonen. Former hosts include Ellen Jokikunnas, Jani Toivola and Niina Backman.

In the seven seasons to date, its winners have been Hanna Pakarinen, Ilkka Jääskeläinen, Ari Koivunen, Koop Arponen, Martti Saarinen and Diandra Flores and Mitra Kaislaranta. Saarinen was the oldest winner at 30 whilst Flores was the youngest at 17. To date, Idols contestants have collectively sold over a million records throughout Finland. Idols is also unique throughout the Idol franchise because so far, the first or second runner-up of almost every season has in fact gone on to become more commercially successful than the winner.

Following the completion of its fourth season, Idols was placed on a hiatus and replaced in 2010 by the X Factor, a new reality singing competition originating from the United Kingdom's version, created by music executive Simon Cowell. However, due to the low ratings of X Factor, MTV3 announced in May 2010, that Idols would return after a two-year hiatus. The fifth season aired in the spring of 2011, and the sixth season in the spring of 2013. The seventh season premiered in the fall of 2013, exactly ten years after the series premiered in 2003.

== Audition cities ==
Season 1: Helsinki, Tampere, Turku
Season 2: Helsinki, Tampere, Turku, Oulu
Season 3: Helsinki, Tampere, Turku, Oulu
Season 4: Helsinki, Tampere, Turku, Oulu, Rovaniemi, Kuopio
Season 5: Helsinki, Tampere, Rovaniemi, Kuopio
Season 6: Helsinki, Tampere, Oulu, Joensuu, Vaasa
Season 7: Helsinki, Tampere, Oulu

== Season synopses ==
=== Season 1 ===
The first season of Idols premiered in the summer of 2003 and like its sister shows around the world, was an instant ratings success. It was hosted by Ellen Jokikunnas and Heikki Paasonen, and the four judges were Finnish musician Jone Nikula, Helsinki Music Company executive Asko Kallonen, and Finnish songwriters and producers Hannu Korkeamäki and Nanna Mikkonen. The semifinals started on 12 December 2003 and on 9 January 2004 the grand finale was held at the Helsinki Ice Hall. Former forklift truck driver Hanna Pakarinen was declared the first Finnish Idol with 60% of the public votes cast, winning 30,000 euros and a recording contract with Sony BMG.

Winner Hanna Pakarinen released "Love Is Like a Song" as her coronation single after being crowned Finnish Idol. It debuted at number 1 on the Finnish singles chart, a position it held for four weeks. Her debut album When I Become Me was released on 9 June 2004 and it peaked at number 2 for five weeks. It was certified platinum and sold over 52,000 copies in Finland. Her second album Stronger was released in September 2005 and it too peaked at number two, however it did not manage to achieve the same commercial success of her debut, though it did earn gold status, selling almost 17,000 copies. Pakarinen's third studio album Lovers was released on Valentine's Day 2007 and was met with high critical and commercial success, with the album praised as her best to date and a clear change of artistic direction, with Pakarinen moving to a much rockier sound. Despite the fact that it charted lower than her two previous efforts (peaking at number 3), Lovers was active on the chart for fifteen weeks and was certified gold, selling 16,000 copies. Later in 2007 she participated in the Eurovision Song Contest with "Leave Me Alone", the second single from her third album and she finished the contest in 17th place. In January 2009 her fourth studio album Love in a Million Shades was released and charted at number 7, her lowest position to date. The album sold 7,000 and became her first album not be certified. Pakarinen's fifth studio album (and her first to be recorded in Finnish), Paperimiehen Tytär was released in October 2010 and debuted at number 9 on the albums chart.

Runner-up Jani Wickholm signed a recording contract with the RCA division of Sony BMG and his debut album Kaikki muuttuu was released in September 2004. The album held the number 1 spot for two consecutive weeks and was certified platinum, selling 30,000 copies to date. His second album Alumiinitähdet was released a year later, peaked at number 6 but sold only 6,000. His third and fourth albums (Yhden lauseen mies and Ranta-ahon valot) were released in January 2007 and April 2008 respectively, and were met with decreasing sales figures. Neither received a certification, with Yhden lauseen mies selling just 5,000 copies and Ranta-ahon valot fewer than 4,000. Wickholm released his first greatest hits compilation, Kirkkaimmat Tähdet in May 2010, but the album failed to achieve commercial success and as a result, missed the Finnish Top 50.

Third place finisher Antti Tuisku also signed with Sony BMG and has gone on to become the most commercially successful contestant in Idols history, with his albums sales higher than those of all his fellow season one contestants combined. His debut album Ensimmäinen appeared in May 2004 and peaked at number 1 for three consecutive weeks. It was certified double platinum, selling 71,000 copies. Antti Tuisku, his self-titled sophomore effort also hit the top spot when released a year later in May 2005, and was certified platinum after selling over 37,000 copies. He released a Christmas album, Minun Jouluni in November of the same year which was certified gold and peaked at number 3. On 4 October 2006 he released his third and fourth studio albums New York and Rovaniemi simultaneously. The former debuted at number 1 and the latter at number 2, making Tuisku the first Finnish artist to release two albums on the same date and have them take the two highest positions on the chart in their first week. New York proved to be more successful and sold 15,000 copies to be certified gold, whilst Rovaniemi sold just under 14,000. In November 2007 Tuisku released Aikaa, his first "greatest hits" collection. Unlike his previous studio albums which had all been top 2 hits however, it stalled in the chart at number 10, selling only 7,000 copies. His fifth studio album Hengitän was released on 23 September 2009, peaked at number 3 and was accredited gold for sales of over 15,000 copies. Tuisku's sixth studio album, Kaunis Kaaos was released on 27 October 2010 and debuted at number 2, Tuisku's highest chart debut since 2006. It was certified platinum for sales of over 20,000 copies. In addition to the success of his albums, Tuisku has also achieved three number 1 singles, more than any other Idols contestant.

Fourth place finisher Christian Forss signed with Edel Records and released his self-titled debut album Christian Forss in late 2004. Although it initially peaked at number 6 for two weeks, the album quickly fell down and left the chart after selling 13,000 copies and did not achieve gold status. His second album Hungry Heart was released a year later but achieved little commercial success and failed to chart on the Finnish Top 40.

Sixth place finisher Anniina Karjalainen independently released her first album Traces of Me in 2006 but it did not receive significant success, failing to chart and selling only 3,000 copies.

==== Finalists ====
(ages stated at time of contest)

Contestant	Age	Hometown	Voted Off	Liveshow Theme
Hanna Pakarinen	22	Lappeenranta	Winner	Grand Finale
Jani Wickholm	26	Kerava	9 January 2004	Grand Finale
Antti Tuisku	19	Rovaniemi	2 January 2004	Rock Hits
Christian Forss	21	Kimito	19 December 2003	Film Songs
Victoria Shuudifonya	20	Turku	12 December 2003	80s Hits
Sonja Nurmela	17	Lappeenranta	5 December 2003	My Idol
Anniina Karjalainen	20	Helsinki	5 December 2003	My Idol

==== Elimination chart ====
Date	Theme	Bottom Three
5 December	My Idol	Sonja Nurmela	Anniina Karjalainen	Christian Forss
		Bottom Two
12 December	80s Hits	Victoria Shuudifonya	Jani Wickholm
19 December	Film Songs	Christian Forss (2)	Jani Wickholm (2)
2 January		Antti Tuisku
9 January	Finale	Jani Wickholm (3)	Hanna Pakarinen

=== Season 2 ===
The second season of Idols began in the autumn of 2005. The city of Oulu was added as the fourth audition venue, with a total of 1479 people auditioning. Ellen Jokikunnas and Heikki Paasonen returned to host, but the judging panel saw a significant change, with only Jone Nikula staying on the show. The other three judges were replaced by Musicmakers executive Kim Kuusi, singer-songwriter Nina Tapio and Jarkko Valtee. The semifinals started on 13 November, with Harjavalta's Katri Ylander the hot favourite to win the contest. However, on 18 December 26-year-old Ilkka Jääskeläinen defeated her in the grand finale with 55% of the vote and took the crown as the second Finnish Idol.

Winner Ilkka Jääskeläinen's debut album Vuosisadan rakkaustarina was released on 29 March 2006 and debuted at number two. However, Jääskeläinen failed to achieve significant critical or commercial success, and his debut album spent only three weeks inside the top five. It sold just over 13,000 copies and to date it is the only debut album by an Idol winner or runner-up not to achieve gold status. In December 2006, only one year after his Idols victory, Jääskeläinen was dropped by Sony BMG, becoming the first (and to date only) winner to be dropped by the company.

Runner-up Katri Ylander was also signed up by Sony BMG and would go on to become the most successful of the season 2 Idols contestants. Katri Ylander, her self-titled debut album was a huge critical success and when released in June 2006, spent three weeks at its peak of number 3. In total it spent 28 weeks on the chart and sold almost 27,000 copies throughout Finland, achieving a gold award. Her follow-up album Kaikki nämä sanat only managed to reach number 13, however it enjoyed a lengthy run on the chart and despite its low chart peak, sold 20,000 copies. Ylander's highly anticipated third studio album Valvojat was released on 2 September 2009 and debuted at number 6, seven places higher than her sophomore effort.

Third place finisher Pete Seppälä released his first single "Energiaa" in March 2006 and it peaked at number 2. His debut album Jos nukun kiltisti sohvalla... was delayed until November however, and as a result failed to match the success of its lead single, failing to chart at all and amassing sales of only 5,000.

Fourth place finisher Agnes Pihlava was signed by RCA Records and her first single "I Thought We Were Lovers" became a great success, peaking at number 2 on the Finnish singles chart. Her debut album When The Night Falls was released in September 2006 and reached number 8, selling 12,000 copies. In 2007, Pihlava parted ways with Sony BMG and signed a new recording contract with Finnish label Scandal Records. Her second album Redemption was released on 21 October 2009. Though critically acclaimed, the album failed to make it into the official Finnish albums chart.

Sixth place finisher Roni Tran received a recording contract with Sony BMG and released his debut album Since 1987 in mid-2006. It peaked at number 26 and spent only three weeks on the chart, selling around 4,500 copies. Tran was later dropped by Sony BMG due to the low success of the album.

==== Finalists ====
(ages stated at time of contest)

Contestant	Age	Hometown	Voted Off	Liveshow Theme
Ilkka Jääskeläinen	26	Hämeenlinna	Winner	Grand Finale
Katri Ylander	19	Huittinen	18 December 2005	Grand Finale
Pete Seppälä	27	Helsinki	11 December 2005	
Agnes Pihlava	25	Hartola	4 December 2005	
Henna Heikkinen	17	Kajaani	27 November 2005	
Roni Tran	18	Hyvinkää	20 November 2005	
Pauliina Kumpulainen	27	Kaustinen	13 November 2005	

==== Elimination chart ====
Date	Bottom Three/Two
13 November	Pauliina Kumpulainen	Roni Tran	Henna Heikkinen
20 November	Roni Tran (2)	Pete Seppälä
27 November	Henna Heikkinen (2)	Pete Seppälä (2)
4 December	Agnes Pihlava	Ilkka Jääskeläinen
11 December	Pete Seppälä (3)
18 December	Katri Ylander	Ilkka Jääskeläinen

=== Season 3 ===
The third season of Idols started on 4 January 2007. Ellen Jokikunnas returned to host the show but Heikki Paasonen did not and was replaced by Jani Toivola. Neither Jarkko Valtee nor Kim Kuusi returned as a judge but were replaced by only one judge: Asko Kallonen, who had previously appeared as a judge in the show's first season in 2004. During the finals, singer-songwriter Tarja Turunen also joined the panel as a special guest judge. The grand finale was held at Helsinki Ice Hall on 5 April 2007, and heavy-metal contestant Ari Koivunen was declared winner with 57% of the vote.

Winner Ari Koivunen signed to Sony BMG and his coronation song "On the Top of the World" hit number 1. However, his debut album, Fuel for the Fire, released in May 2007 was entirely composed of heavy metal material, Koivunen's signature style. The album was a huge success, debuting at number 1 and remaining there for a huge twelve consecutive weeks. Fuel for the Fire sold over 71,000 copies and received a double platinum certification. Koivunen's second album Becoming came in June 2008 and it too entered the chart at number 1; however it held the spot for only a single week and its success did not come near that of its predecessor, selling 17,000 units. Later in 2008 it was announced that Koivunen had become the new lead singer of Finnish heavy metal group Amoral. His first album with them, Show Your Colors, was released in May 2009 and peaked at number 19, selling 2,000 copies to date.

Runner-up Anna Abreu was signed to RCA Records and has gone on to become the highest-selling female Idols contestant to date. Anna Abreu, her self-titled debut album, was released to massive success in August 2007. After peaking in its first week at number 1, the album spent 37 weeks on the chart and is certified double platinum with sales of over 86,000 copies – the highest for any album by an Idols alumni. Abreu's second album Now was released in October 2008 and it too was met with similar success to is predecessor. Its lead single "Vinegar" became one of the year's highest selling singles and spent three weeks at number 1, while the album itself sold 50,000 copies and was certified platinum, becoming the highest selling album of 2008. Abreu's third studio album Just a Pretty Face? was released on 21 October 2009 and peaked at number 2. It was certified gold in its first day of release after selling a massive 23,000 copies on that day alone, giving the album one of the highest first-day sales in Finnish music history. It has since been certified platinum for sales exceeding 30,000 units. Abreu's fourth studio album, Rush was released on 30 March 2011 and debuted at number 1, becoming Abreu's third chart-topping album. The lead single 'Hysteria' was released digitally on 10 January and peaked at number 6.

Third-place finisher Kristiina Brask was signed to the Helsinki Music Company label and her debut album Silmät sydämeeni was released in November 2007. It peaked at number 9, has sold over 18,000 copies and received a gold certification. Following the release of her first album, Brask left HMC and instead signed a deal with Warner Bros. Records for her second album. Titled Kuivilla susta, Brask's second studio album was released on 9 September 2009 and debuted at number 11.

Fourth-place finisher Kristian Meurman signed a contract with RCA Records and his debut album Ensiaskeleet was released in June 2007. It debuted at number 2, a position it held for its first eight weeks on the chart, never quite managing to rise up to the top spot. The album sold over 26,000 copies and as a result was awarded gold status. Meurman's second studio album Läpi yön emerged almost exactly one year later, reached number 3 and sold almost 12,000 copies. His third studio album Galaksi was released in June 2009 but failed to chart and sold only 1000 copies. As a result, Meurman was dropped by record label, RCA Records.

Fifth-place finisher Panu Larnos released his debut album Million Miles in early 2008, and although initially billed to be a success, the album failed to chart at all and has sold less than 7,000 copies to date.

==== Elimination chart ====
Date	Theme	Bottom Three
1 March	Birth Year	Johanna Hämäläinen	Panu Larnos	Kristiina Brask
		Bottom Two
8 March	Dedications	Mia Permanto	Panu Larnos (2)
15 March	Kings and Queens	Panu Larnos (3)	Anna Abreu
22 March	My Idols	Kristian Meurman	Kristiina Brask (2)
29 March	Finnish Hits	Kristiina Brask (3)
5 April	Finale	Anna Abreu (2)	Ari Koivunen

=== Season 4 ===
The fourth season of Idols started in the autumn of 2008, with the cities of Rovaniemi and Kuopio added as the fifth and sixth audition venues. Ellen Jokikunnas and Jani Toivola both returned to present the show once again, but were also joined by a third host in the form of Heikki Paasonen, who had previously left the show after season 2. Judge Asko Kallonen left the show once again and was replaced by record producer Patric Sarin. The finals started on 9 November and contestant Pete Parkkonen was considered favourite to win. However, he was unexpectedly eliminated in third place. The grand finale was held on 14 December and Koop Arponen was declared the fourth Finnish Idol with 70.3% of the vote.

Winner Koop Arponen signed a recording contract with Sony BMG and his coronation single "Insomnia" debuted at number 1 on the Finnish singles chart, a position it held for two weeks. His debut album New Town peaked at number 1 in its first week, knocking third-place contestant Pete Parkonen's album off the top spot. The album remained active on the chart for sixteen weeks and has sold almost 21,000 copies, certifying it gold. Arponen's sophomore effort, Bright Lights was released on 24 March 2010 and debuted at number 8.

Runner-up Anna Puu signed to RCA Records and has since gone on to become the most successful season 4 Idols contestant. Her first single "C'est la vie" reached number 1 in its ninth week on the chart and her debut album Anna Puu went straight in at number 1 a week after its release on 29 April 2009. It held the top spot for a total of twelve weeks and received huge critical acclaim from the Finnish music industry. It has spent an Idols alumni record of 21 weeks in the top three and 45 weeks in total on the albums chart. It has sold over 70,000 copies to be accredited double platinum and is ranked as the twelfth best-performing album in Finnish music history. In its 45th week on the chart, Anna Puu sat at number 9, and only fell out of the Top 50 the following week because it had been placed in the mid-price chart. Puu's highly anticipated second album Sahara was released on 26 May 2010 and debuted at the top spot, becoming her second consecutive number one album. It held this position for a total of eight weeks.

Third place finisher Pete Parkkonen received a recording contract from Sony BMG and was the first season 4 contestant to release an album. Appropriately titled First Album, Parkkonen's post-Idols debut reached number 1 in its first week. The album went on to sell just over 24,000 copies and was accredited a gold award. Parkkonen's second studio album, I'm An Accident was released on 18 February 2010. It failed to gain the same success as his debut, peaking at number 21 and dropping out of the albums chart after only one week.

Fourth place finisher Kalle Löfström signed a deal with Edel Records and released his debut album Born in 84 on 10 June 2009. The album failed to attract any success however and did not chart, selling less than 1,500 copies to date.

==== Elimination chart ====
Stages:		Semi-Finals						Finals					
Weeks:		10/16	10/19	10/23	10/26	10/30	11/2	11/9	11/16	11/23	11/30	12/7	12/14
Place	Contestant	Result											
1	Koop Arponen												Winner
2	Anna Puustjärvi										Btm 2		Runner-up
3	Pete Parkkonen					Btm 2						Elim	
4	Kalle Löfström	Btm 2		Btm 2					Btm 2	Btm 2	Elim		
5	Anna-Kaisa Riitijoki								Btm 3	Elim			
6	Jaana Leiniäinen						Btm 2	Btm 2	Elim				
7	Saana Liikanen							Elim					
Semi	Marika Tyyvi				Btm 2		Elim						
Semi	Vesa Suonto					Elim							
Semi	Jannike Sandström				Elim								
Semi	Wellu Rowaltz			Elim									
Semi	Linda Herranen		Elim										
Semi	Daniel S. Diago	Elim											

Legend
Women	Men	Top 7	Top 13	Eliminated	Safe	not performed

=== Season 5 ===
On 17 May 2010, it was announced that Idols would return for a fifth season, following a two-year hiatus. Regional auditions took place in November and December 2010, with the season premiering on MTV3 on 3 February 2011. The Finale was aired in May 2011.

Whilst season 4 judges Jone Nikula and Nina Tapio both returned to the panel, Patric Sarin did not and was replaced by music executive Sami Pitkämö. For the first time in the show's history, guest judges appeared during the regional audition, including Katri Helena and season 1 Idols alumni Antti Tuisku. Heikki Paasonen returned as host but neither Jani Toivola nor Ellen Jokikunnas joined him. Instead, Niina Backman was brought in as the show's new hostess.

Idols Extra, a show that featured extra scenes behind the scenes and discussion about the show with varying guest, was replaced by a similar new show, Idols Studio. Even though Idols Extra was aired on Sub, Idols Studio was aired on MTV3 like the main show. Idols Studio was hosted by Janne Kataja, who is a former host of Idols Extra.

This season also saw the first ever Idols charity show, in which contestants, previous Idols alumni and a variety of national and international stars performed and the Finnish public donated money in aid of FinnChurchAid. The show was broadcast on 24 April 2011, and was inspired by Idol Gives Back, which has been broadcast three times as part of American Idol.

This was the first season that did not include separate elimination shows, and the voting results were announced either at the end of the performance show or alternatively at the beginning of the following live performance.

=== Season 6 ===
On 8 May 2011, it was announced that Idols will return for a sixth season. Regional auditions took place in the fall of 2011, and the season premiered on MTV3 on 1 January 2012.

The show underwent a number of changes from season five, including two new judges and the removal of semifinals. Heikki Paasonen and Niina Backman both returned to host the show, but former judges Nina Tapio and Sami Pitkämö were replaced by singer Laura Voutilainen and music manager Tommi Liimatainen, making Jone Nikula the only existing judge from the previous season. Voutilainen appeared in the previous season as a guest judge.

This was the first, and so far only, season that did not include semifinals. Instead, two TOP15 live shows were aired, and the ten finalists were to be decided by judges and public's votes.

Diandra Flores won the season at the age of 17, on 6 May 2013.

=== Season 7 ===
In late 2012, MTV3 announced that it was unclear whether Idols would return for another season. However, on 26 February 2013, it was announced that Idols would return in 2013 to celebrate the series' tenth anniversary.

The show once again saw multiple changes from the previous season. Heikki Paasonen will return to host the show, but Niina Backman will not, making this the first season to have only one host. Laura Voutilainen and Tommi Liimatainen both left the series after only one season and will be replaced by singer Lauri Ylönen, rapper Sini Sabotage and drummer Jussi 69. This is the first season since the second season to have four regular judges. Mitra Kaislaranta and Joseph Miettinen are the final two of this season's Idols. At the end, Mitra won the show with her winning song: Äkkisyvää

== Top-selling Idols alumni albums ==
This list only includes contestants with at least one certified album, and the totals do not include EPs, digital-only albums and/or pre-Idols recordings.

Gold, Platinum, and/or Multi-Platinum (Finnish Sales Only)
Note: In 2010, the IFPI changed the sales thresh-holds for Finnish gold and platinum certification from 15,000 and 30,000 to 10,000 and 20,000, respectively.

	Former contestant Total sales	Debut album	Second album	Third album	Fourth album	Fifth album	Sixth album	Seventh album	Eighth album	Ninth album	Tenth album
1.	Antti Tuisku (Season 1, 3rd Place); 238,905	Ensimmäinen (12 May 2004); RCA; 71,163; 2xPlatinum; Peak: #1; Weeks: 27	Antti Tuisku (11 May 2005); RCA; 37,520; Platinum; Peak: #1; Weeks: 20	Minun Jouluni (16 November 2005); RCA; 25,121; Gold; Peak: #3; Weeks: 6	New York (4 October 2006); HMC; 15,009; Gold; Peak: #1; Weeks: 14	Rovaniemi (4 October 2006); HMC; 13,749; N/A; Peak: #2; Weeks: 7	Aikaa – Greatest Hits (7 November 2007); HMC; 7,000; N/A; Peak: #10; Weeks: 9	Hengitän (23 September 2009); HMC; 15,817; Gold; Peak: #3; Weeks: 16	Kaunis Kaaos (27 October 2010); HMC; 24,069; Platinum; Peak: #2; Weeks: 31	Minun Jouluni 2 (23 November 2011); HMC; 19,457; Gold; Peak: #5; Weeks: 10	Toisenlainen Tie (10 May 2013); Warner; 10,000; Gold; Peak: #2; Weeks: 20
2.	Anna Abreu (Season 3, Runner-up); 197,083	Anna Abreu (20 August 2007); RCA; 86,170; 2xPlatinum; Peak: #1; Weeks: 37	Now (22 October 2008); RCA; 50,695; Platinum; Peak: #1; Weeks: 18	Just A Pretty Face? (21 October 2009); RCA; 33,278; Platinum; Peak: #2; Weeks: 26	Rush (30 March 2011); RCA; 11,940; Gold; Peak: #1; Weeks: 10	Greatest Hits (22 February 2012); RCA; 5,000; N/A; Peak: #18; Weeks: 6	V (30 May 2014); Warner; 10,000; Gold; Peak: #4; Weeks: 19				
3.	Anna Puu (Season 4, Runner-up); 144,327	Anna Puu (29 April 2009); RCA; 77,925; 2xPlatinum; Peak: #1; Weeks: 45	Sahara (26 May 2010); RCA; 40,333; Platinum; Peak: #1; Weeks: 44	Antaudun (26 October 2012); RCA; 26,069; Platinum; Peak: #2; Weeks: 26							
4.	Hanna Pakarinen (Season 1, Winner); 102,462	When I Become Me (9 June 2004); RCA; 52,826; Platinum; Peak: #2; Weeks: 17	Stronger (7 September 2005); RCA; 16,473; Gold; Peak: #2; Weeks: 7	Lovers (14 February 2007); RCA; 16,163; Gold; Peak: #3; Weeks: 15	Love in a Million Shades (14 January 2009); RCA; 7,000; N/A; Peak: #7; Weeks: 5	Paperimiehen Tytär (20 October 2010); RCA; 5,000; N/A; Peak: #9; Weeks: 4	Olipa Kerran Elämä (23 August 2013); RCA; 5,000; N/A; Peak: #9; Weeks: 4				
5.	Ari Koivunen/ Amoral (Season 3, Winner); 96,691	Fuel for the Fire (30 May 2007); RCA; 71,347; 2xPlatinum; Peak: #1; Weeks: 30	Becoming (11 June 2008); RCA; 17,344; Gold; Peak: #1; Weeks: 10	Show Your Colors (7 May 2009); Spinefarm; 3,000; N/A; Peak: #19; Weeks: 1	Beneath (27 October 2011); Imperial Cassette; 2,000; N/A; Peak: #30; Weeks: 1	Fallen Leaves and Dead Sparrows (14 February 2014); Imperial Cassette; 3,000; N/A; Peak: #18; Weeks: 2					
6.	Katri Ylander (Season 2, Runner-up); 55,446	Katri Ylander (14 June 2006); RCA; 24,068; Gold; Peak: #3; Weeks: 28	Kaikki Nämä Sanat (31 October 2007); RCA; 19,378; Gold; Peak: #13; Weeks: 18	Valvojat (2 September 2009); RCA; 8,000; N/A; Peak: #6; Weeks: 4	Maailman Ihanimmat (8 June 2011); RCA; 2,000; N/A; Peak: Did not chart Weeks: 0	Uusi Maa (13 September 2013); Finnish Music; 2,000; N/A; Peak: #35; Weeks: 2					
7.	Jani Wickholm (Season 1, Runner-up); 53,115	Kaikki Muuttuu (8 September 2004); RCA; 30,115; Platinum; Peak: #1; Weeks: 19	Alumiinitähdet (28 September 2005); RCA; 6,000; N/A; Peak: #6; Weeks: 5	Yhden Lauseen Mies (24 January 2007); RCA; 5,000; N/A; Peak: #10; Weeks: 7	Ranta-ahon Valot (30 April 2008); RCA; 3,000; N/A; Peak: #14; Weeks: 8	Jouluksi kotiin (5 November 2008); RCA; 2,000; N/A; Peak: Did not chart Weeks: 0	Kirkkaimmat Tähdet (5 May 2010); RCA; 2,000; N/A; Peak: Did not chart Weeks: 0	Aivan Eri Mies (13 June 2012); Motley Records; 2,000; N/A; Peak: Did not chart Weeks: 0			
8.	Kristian Meurman (Season 3, 4th Place); 38,949	Ensiaskeleet (6 June 2007); RCA; 26,465; Gold; Peak: #2; Weeks: 17	Läpi Yön (18 June 2008); RCA; 11,484; N/A; Peak: #3; Weeks: 11	Galaksi (12 June 2009); RCA; 1,000; N/A; Peak: Did not chart Weeks: 0							
9.	Pete Parkkonen (Season 4, 3rd Place); 30,067	First Album (11 March 2009); RCA; 24,067; Gold; Peak: #1; Weeks: 19	I'm An Accident (17 February 2010); RCA; 2,000; N/A; Peak: #21; Weeks: 1	Pete Parkkonen (25 April 2014); Warner; 4,000; N/A; Peak: #20; Weeks: 3							
10.	Koop Arponen (Season 4, Winner); 27,720	New Town (18 March 2009); RCA; 20,720; Gold; Peak: #1; Weeks: 17	Bright Lights (24 March 2010); RCA; 7,000; N/A; Peak: #8; Weeks: 5								
11.	Kristiina Brask (Season 3, 3rd Place); 23,205	Silmät Sydämeeni (7 November 2007); HMC; 18,205; Gold; Peak: #9; Weeks: 18	Kuivilla Susta (9 September 2009); HMC; 5,000; N/A; Peak: #11; Weeks: 4								
12.	Diandra Flores (Season 6, Winner); 15,566	Outta My Head (6 July 2012); Universal; 15,566; Gold; Peak: #1; Weeks: 16	TBA (October 2014); Universal; TBA; N/A; Peak: TBA; Weeks: TBA								

=== Uncertified albums ===
The following is a comprehensive list of other Idols alumni album sales and reflects that commercial success can be achieved through association with Idols and with post-Idols promotion, although the degree of success varies considerably (this list only includes contestants who have numbers available, and again does not include EPs, digital-only albums, holiday albums or pre-Idols recordings):

	Former Contestant	Total Sales	Albums
13.	Agnes Pihlava (Season 2, 4th Place)	14,000	When The Night Falls (2006) #8; Redemption (2009) Did Not Chart
14.	Christian Forss (Season 1, 4th Place)	13,529	Christian Forss (2004) #6; Hungry Heart (2005) Did Not Chart
15.	Ilkka Jääskeläinen (Season 2, Winner)	13,366	Vuosisadan Rakkaustarina (2006) #2
16.	Panu Larnos (Season 3, 5th Place)	6,000	Million Miles (2008) Did Not Chart
17.	Pete Seppälä (Season 2, 3rd Place)	5,000	Jos Nukun Kiltisti Sohvalla... (2006) Did Not Chart
18.	Roni Tran (Season 2, 6th Place)	4,500	Since 1987 (2006) #26
19.	Martti Saarinen (Season 5, Winner)	3,500	Martti Saarinen (2011) #10
20.	Anniina Karjalainen (Season 1, 6th Place)	3,000	Traces of Me (2006) Did Not Chart
21.	Kalle Löfström (Season 4, 4th Place)	1,500	Born in 84 (2009) Did Not Chart

== Best-selling Idols alumni songs ==
NOTE: Singles are only included where sales figures are available.
The table is ranked in term of sales, but can be sorted other ways by clicking on the icon.

	Artist	Single	Season	Release date	Album	Top 20 Peak	IFPI Cert.	Sales
1	Antti Tuisku	"En Halua Tietää"	1 (3rd)	2004	Ensimmäinen	1	Gold	8,137
2	Anna Puu	"C'est La Vie"	4 (2nd)	2009	Anna Puu	1	Gold	7,588
3	Christian Forss	"Unforgettable"	1 (4th)	2004	Christian Forss	4	Gold	7,076
4	Antti Tuisku	"Juuret"	1 (3rd)	2009	Hengitän	1	Gold	6,650
5	Anna Abreu	"End of Love"	3 (2nd)	2007	Anna Abreu	8	Gold	6,159
6	Hanna Pakarinen	"Love is Like a Song"	1 (1st)	2004	When I Become Me	1	Gold	5,987
7	Hanna Pakarinen	"Leave Me Alone"	1 (1st)	2007	Lovers	8	Gold	5,537
8	Ari Koivunen	"Hear My Call"	3 (1st)	2007	Fuel for the Fire		Gold	5,359
9	Anna Abreu	"Vinegar"	3 (2nd)	2008	Now	1		4,566
10	Kristian Meurman	"Lapin Kesä"	3 (4th)	2007	Ensiakleet			4,494
11	Anna Abreu	"Music Everywhere"	3 (2nd)	2009	Just A Pretty Face?	2		3,594
12	Ari Koivunen	"On the Top of the World"	3 (1st)	2007	Fuel for the Fire	1		3,581
13	Anna Puu	"Kaunis Päivä"	4 (2nd)	2009	Anna Puu	6		3,202
