= Damn You =

Damn You may refer to:

== Television ==
- "Damn You, Eggs Benedict", 2008 episode of Two and a Half Men (season 6)

== Music ==
- "Damn U", song by Prince
- "Damn You", song from Rebelution (Tanya Stephens album)
- "Damn You", song from Stronger (Hanna Pakarinen album)
