= Meurman =

Meurman is a surname. Notable people with the surname include:

- Arne Meurman (born 1956), Swedish mathematician
- Kristian Meurman (born 1979), Finnish singer
- Otto-Iivari Meurman (1890–1994), Finnish architect
