= Tran Binh Trong (disambiguation) =

Trần Bình Trọng (1259–1285) was a Vietnamese general of the Trần Dynasty. Tran Binh Trong may also refer to:

- Roni Tran Binh Trong (b. 1987), a Finnish singer of Vietnamese ancestry
- RVNS Trần Bình Trọng (HQ-05), a Republic of Vietnam Navy frigate in commission from 1971 to 1975, named after the Trần Dynasty general
