= Stella (band) =

Finnish band

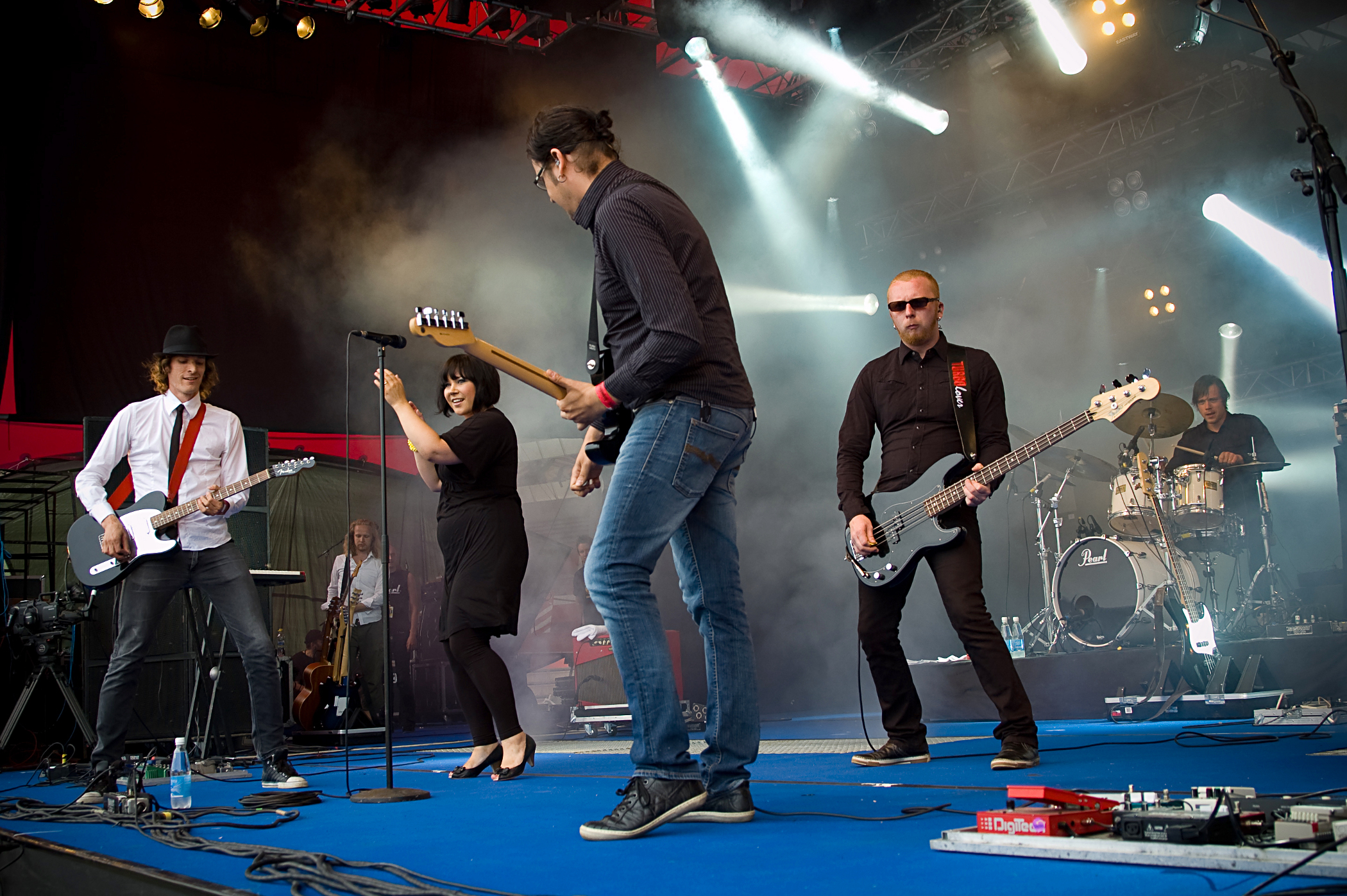
- Stella band performing at the Ilosaarirock festival on the 13th of July 2008 in Joensuu, Finland.

Background information
- Origin: Joensuu, Finland

Stella was a rock band that was formed in Joensuu, Finland in 2002. The band quickly managed a deal with Sony Records and released their first album Kuuntelija in 2004. The album only became a modest seller and soon after the band was moved to Elements Music label. Success came to the band after Katri Ylander, a contestant on the Idols, performed a cover of "Piste." from Stella's first album. This led Stella in to the media and popularity as both the music press and public waited for their second release. The second album, Pelkääjän Paikalla, was released in 2006, debuting at number 5 on Finnish album charts. In April 2008 Stella released their third album, Löytäjä Saa Pitää, and topped at number three on national album charts. The lead singer Marja Tahvanainen died in 2018 from a brain hemorrhage at the age of 38.

== Band members ==
- Marja Tahvanainen (born Kiiskilä; 6 November 1979 – 29 May 2018) – Vocals
- Heikki Marttila (3 October 1977) – Guitar and backing vocals
- Janne Sivonen (18 May 1979) – Guitar, keyboards
- Tuomas Tahvanainen (21 November 1978) – Bass
- Matti Virkkunen (12 April 1981) – Drums

== Discography ==
=== Albums ===
- Kuuntelija (The Listener), released 3 May 2004

1. Kelle ihosi tuoksuu? (Who does your skin smell like?) 4:29
2. Hiekka (Sand) 3:53
3. Sädepeili (Ray Mirror) 3:35
4. Aamun kuiskaus (The Morning Whisper) 3:55
5. Veri (Blood) 6:01
6. Revin kappaleiksi (I'll Tear Apart) 4:06
7. 100 km/h 4:14
8. Tunti (Hour) 3:59
9. Suloinen (Sweet) 3:35
10. Piste. (Period.) 3:37
11. Kuuntelija (The Listener) 4:28

- Pelkääjän paikalla (On The Front Seat, lit. "On The Fearers Place"), released 29 March 2006

1. Viimeisen kerran (For The Last Time) 4:25
2. Totuuden henki (The Spirit Of Truth / Holy Ghost) 3:30
3. Silmäripset (Eyelashes) 4:19
4. Kultasiipi (Goldwing) 6:09
5. Puolet sinusta (Half of You) 3:59
6. 25 3:56
7. Häävalssi (The Wedding Waltz) 3:56
8. Nimikivi (Namestone (=Gravestone) 4:51
9. Lumottu (Charmed/Chanted) 3:45
10. Tulva (Flood) 3:59
11. Vie mua (Take Me) 4:44

- Löytäjä Saa Pitää (Finders Keepers), released 2008

1. Säikyn aina kun puhelin soi (I get scared every time the phone rings) 3:58
2. Korkokengät (High heels) 3:56
3. En tunne sinua enää (I don't know you anymore) 4:05
4. Puitten sylissä (Hugged by trees?) 8:18
5. Kaksikko (Couple/Pair) 4:03
6. Suden silmät (The eyes of a wolf) 4:35
7. Hipaisun päässä (A stroke away/A stroke on the head) 5:25
8. Rauhoitettu (Calmed) 4:11
9. Löytäjä saa pitää (Finders keepers/The finder is allowed to keep) 3:59
10. Islanti (Iceland) 5:32
11. Otavalle (To the big dipper) 5:14

- Jokin On Muuttumassa (Something Is Changing) released 2011

1. Sunnuntai ja hidas sää (Sunday and slow weather) 3:49
2. Kadun suurin talo (The biggest house of the street) 4:08
3. Vaaran päällä (On the danger) 4:24
4. Kesän heinä on hiljaa hetken (Summer's hay is silent a moment) 6:16
5. Keskipäivän demoni (Demon of the midday) 3:31
6. Tästä syksy vasta alkaa (This autumn is just beginning) 4:41
7. Kutsumattomat vieraat jääkää kotiin (Unwelcomed visitors stay home) 4:16
8. Lintupoika ja minä (Birdboy and me) 3:26
9. Hän ei ole täällä (He's not here) 5:13
10. Karhu (Bear) 3:59

=== Singles ===
- Hiekka (6 October 2003)
- Aamun kuiskaus (29 March 2004)
- Piste (2. August 2004 re-released on 2005)
- Kuuntelija (2004)
- Totuuden henki (1 March 2006)
- Puolet sinusta (2006)
- Lumottu (2006)
- Häävalssi (2006)
- Korkokengät
- Suden silmät
- Löytäjä saa pitää
- Säikyn aina kun puhelin soi
