= Mia Permanto =

Finnish pop singer and radio host

Hanna-Mia Permanto (April 21, 1988 – March 18, 2008) was a Finnish pop singer and radio host. She was placed sixth in the Idols finals of 2007.

== Early life and family ==
Permanto was a Sweden Finn who was born and raised in Stockholm, Sweden, but in 2006, she decided to move to Finland, the country of her parents.

== Career ==
She hosted Bad Taste program on YLE Radio Extrem in 2007.

In the Idols, Permanto was a finalist but she was eliminated on March 8, 2007. A performance by Permanto was released on the Idols 2007 compilation album.

Permanto sings on the single "Rising Sun" by Heikki L in October 2007. She can also be heard on The Prophecy album by Cristal Snow. She also performs on the Finnish DJ Alex Kunnari song "Breathe In".

She had started to record an album with Helsinki Music Works just before her death.

== Death ==
Permanto died in Helsinki at age 19. In November 2008, her mother told the media that Permanto had taken medicine for her back and another medicine for smoking cessation, and that the mix of the drugs had caused her death. The mother believed the death to be an accident.

An Idols finalist, singer Kristian Meurman made a song, "Miksen saanut yrittää", for Permanto's memory.
