= Pete Seppälä =

Finnish singer

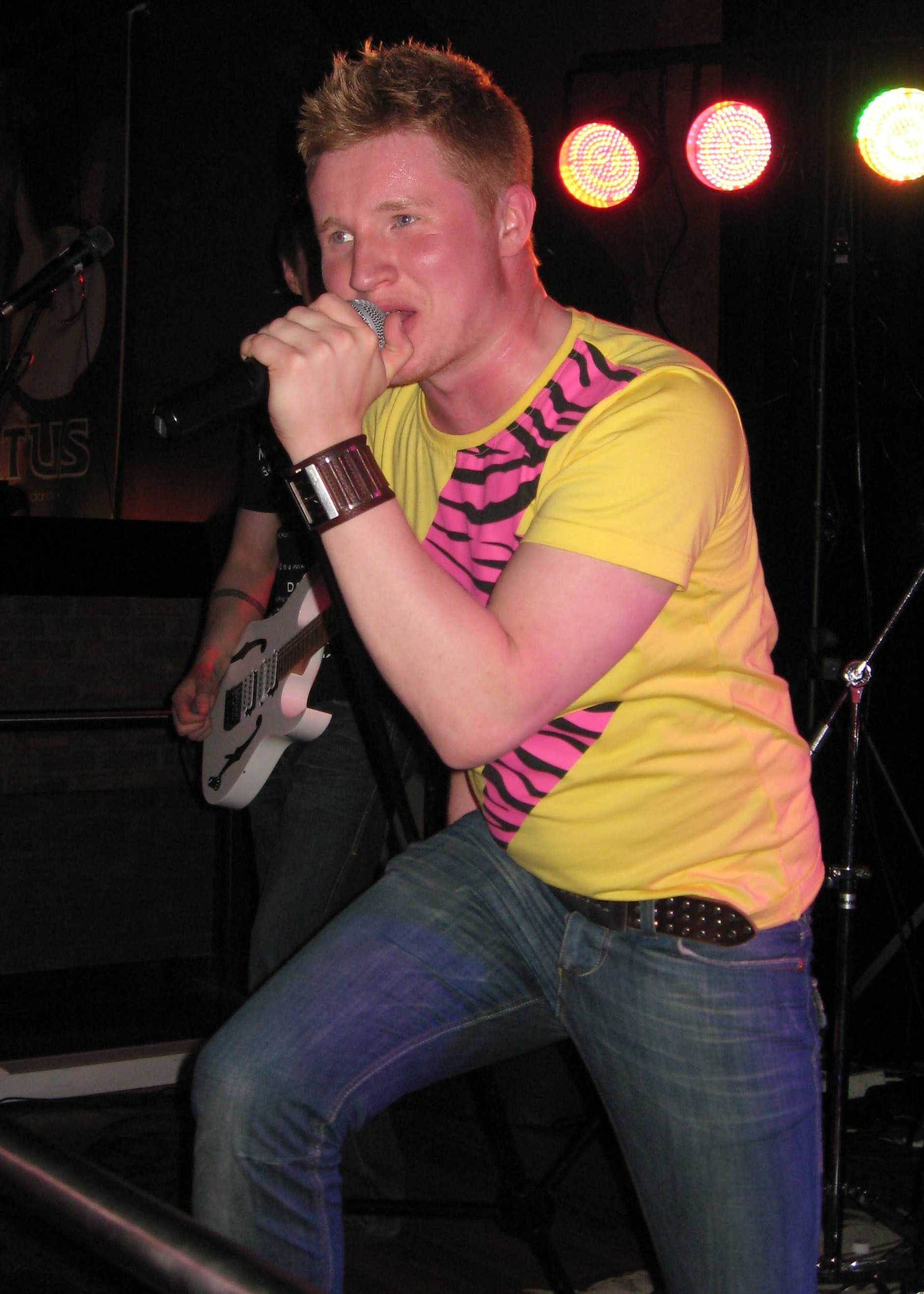
Pete Seppälä (2008)

Pete Seppälä (born 1 March 1978) is a Finnish singer who rose to popularity after placing third in Idols Finland 2, the Finnish version of Pop Idol. He was born in Espoo, Finland.

== Idols Finland 2 performances ==
Helsinki Auditions: Leave Right Now by Will Young
Semi Finals: When Susannah Cries by Espen Lind
Top 7: Hold The Line by Toto
Top 6: You Give Love A Bad Name by Bon Jovi
Top 5: F-F-Falling by The Rasmus
Top 5: Unihiekkaa by Egotrippi
Top 4: How Deep Is Your Love? by Bee Gees
Top 4: Disco Inferno by Tina Turner
Top 3: Have A Nice Day by Bon Jovi
Top 3: Real To Me by Brian McFadden
Top 3: Armo by Apulanta

== Discography ==
- Idols: Finalistit 2005 (December 2005)
