= Cheam High School =

Location
- Chatsworth Road; SM3 8PW; Cheam, Greater London, SM3 8PW; England; 51.365966°N 0.217999°W

Information
- Type: Academy
- Motto: Undaunted
- Established: 1933
- Department for Education URN: 136785 Tables
- Ofsted: Reports
- Executive Principal: Rebecca Allott
- Headteacher: Pete Naudi
- Staff: 250+
- Gender: Co-educational
- Age: 11 to 18
- Enrolment: 2,121
- Capacity: 1,980
- Website: http://www.cheam.sutton.sch.uk

Cheam High School is a mixed sex academy school located in Cheam, London Borough of Sutton, South London. It consists of a lower school, for those aged between 11 and 16, wherein each year group consists of 300 students and a sixth form for ages 16–18. Despite having an official capacity of 1,980, there are 2,121 students enrolled at the school as of January 2025.

The school has specialisms in languages and the arts. The previous headteacher Rebecca Allott succeeded TJ Vaughan on his retirement in 2000. Peter Naudi is headteacher and the deputy head is P Vosper.

== History ==
The school was established in 1933. It converted to an academy in 2011.

== Facilities ==
The school has a large artificial grass pitch and smaller all-weather pitch, a fitness gym area and multiple halls, including a sports hall. The Cheam gymnastics club operates out of the school's building.

== Awards ==
The school holds the Artsmark Gold Award from the Arts Council recognising the high quality of work in various aspects of the curriculum including art, drama, music and dance. It also has the Sportsmark Award recognising its out-of-hours sports program.

== Inspections ==
Ofsted awarded Cheam an "Outstanding" report in 2007, 2010 and 2015. This is the highest Ofsted grade, only achieved by 20% of schools.

== Notable former pupils ==
- Koop Arponen, singer
- Jonathan Austen, also known as Jonathan I, leader of the micronation Austenasia
- Lee Boxell, missing person
- Seb Brown, footballer
- Jane Wilson-Howarth, physician and author
