= Hanna Pakarinen =

Finnish singer (born 1981)

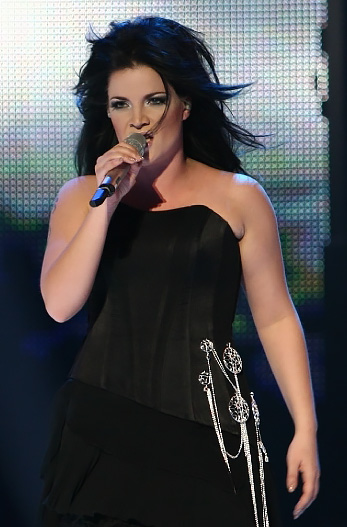
- Pakarinen at the Eurovision Song Contest 2007

Background information
- Born: Hanna Helena Pakarinen; 17 April 1981 (age 44); Lappeenranta, Finland
- Genres: Pop, pop-rock, adult contemporary
- Occupation: Singer
- Years active: 2004–present
- Label: Sony BMG (2004–present)
- Website: www.hannapakarinen.fi

Hanna Helena Pakarinen (born 17 April 1981) is a Finnish pop and pop-rock singer who rose to fame as the winner of the first series of the Finnish singing competition Idols in 2004. Since then, she has represented Finland in the Eurovision Song Contest in 2007 in her homeland, and has sold over 91,000 certified records in Finland, which places her among the top 50 best-selling female soloists in her home country.

== Early life ==
Hanna was born in Lappeenranta, South Karelia (though she now resides in Helsinki she still proudly speaks the local dialect of the region). Throughout her early twenties, she worked as a forklift driver, an unusual occupation for a female, and was part of a local Finnish band named Rained.

In the 2000 Finnish municipal elections, she stood as a candidate for the Social Democratic Party of Finland.

== Career ==
=== Idols Series 1 ===
In the summer of 2003, a twenty-three-year-old Pakarinen auditioned for the inaugural season of the Finnish singing competition Idols in the country's capital, Helsinki. Her powerful and emotion-filled vocals impressed the panel of judges and she was unanimously passed through to the next round of the contest, before making it through to the live finals. From the outset of the live shows, Pakarinen was considered a hot favourite to win. She received consistent high praise from the judges, and on one occasion she was even hugged by one of them. On numerous occasions they described her as, "the first real singer in the competition".

On 3 January 2004 Pakarinen secured a place in the top two grand finale of the contest, alongside Jani Wickholm. During the finale, broadcast a week later on 9 January, Pakarinen performed Tina Turner's The Best, the Bangles' Eternal Flame and the coronation song made especially for the Idols winner, Tulin Voittamaan ("I Came to Win"). She also made an English version of the song titled Love is Like a Song. Later that night, it was announced that Pakarinen had secured 60% (or 413,000) of the viewers' votes, thereby defeating runner-up Jani Wickholm, who had received 40% (or 282,000) of the public vote. Pakarinen was crowned as the first Finnish Idol and was given an advanced payment of €30,000, along with a recording contract with Sony BMG.

=== Post-Idols career ===
==== 2004–2005: When I Become Me ====
Immediately after winning Idols, Pakarinen signed a recording contract with Sony BMG and she released her debut single "Love Is Like A Song", which debuted at number one on the Finnish singles chart, a position it held for four non-consecutive weeks. Her debut album When I Become Me was released in June 2004, five months after her win on Idols, and debuted at number two on the Finnish albums chart. Although it held the number two spot for a total of five weeks and stayed within the top five for ten weeks, the album did not manage to reach the number one position. However, it was still a success and was certified platinum for the sale of over 52,000 copies in Finland. Although a second single was not released commercially from the album, the songs "Fearless", "How Can I Miss You" and the title track "When I Become Me" were released as promotional singles in order to support the album, with "How Can I Miss You" becoming Pakarinen's first music video. Pakarinen also embarked on her first nationwide tour as a recording artist named the When I Become Me Tour, which received positive reviews and sold out at every venue.

==== 2005–2006: Stronger ====
In the late summer of 2005, Pakarinen returned to the music scene with her second commercial single "Kiss Of Life", which would serve as the first single to be taken from her second album Stronger. The song debuted and peaked at number four on the Finnish singles chart, and when the album was released in September, it (like her first album) debuted and peaked at number two. Stronger was not as successful as her first album, falling to number ten within its first three weeks, however it still managed to sell almost 17,000 copies and was certified gold. The songs "Stronger Without You" and "Damn You" were chosen as promotional singles, the first of which was accompanied by a music video. To further support the album, Pakarinen travelled across Finland on her Stronger Tour, performing many songs from the new album as well as several from her previous record.

==== 2007: Lovers and Eurovision ====
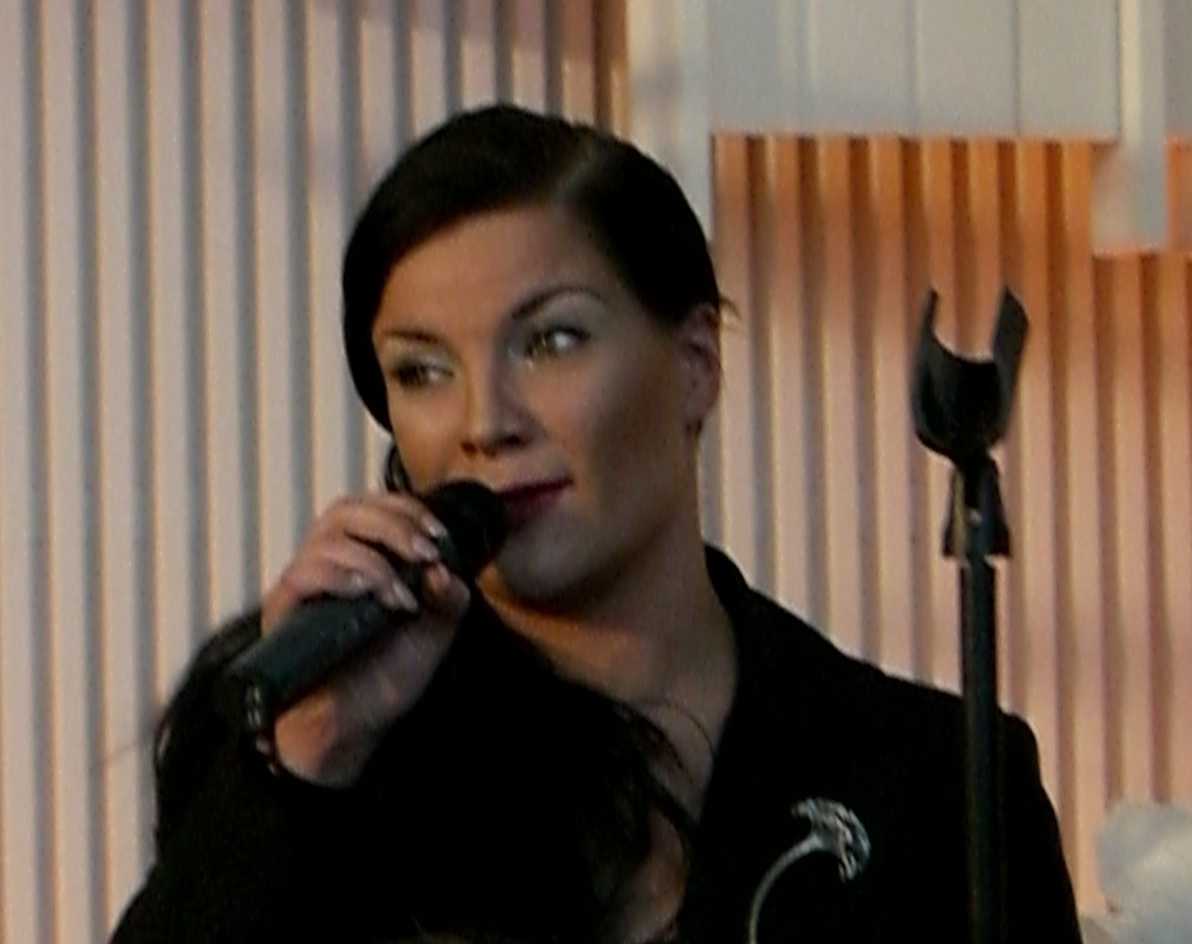
Pakarinen in 2007

In January 2007, after a short break from the music industry, Pakarinen released the song "Go Go" as a promotional single from her highly anticipated third studio album. The song was accompanied by a music video, and when Lovers, the third album was released on 14 February, it debuted at number three on the chart. Although it placed lower than her previous record, Lovers went on to become much more critically successful and spent over twice as many weeks on the albums chart. It was certified gold and sold 16,000 copies in Finland. The album also marked Pakarinen's personal debut as a songwriter. She is credited on six of the album's eleven original tracks.

On 17 February 2007 it was announced that Pakarinen had been chosen to represent Finland in the Eurovision Song Contest in Helsinki with the song "Leave Me Alone", the first commercial single from her new album and her third commercial single overall. During the live finals, the song received 53 points and finished in 17th place. However, the contest allowed Pakarinen to gain a much wider European audience, and "Leave Me Alone" and its music video became very popular, especially in Sweden. Here, the song topped the radio chart for three consecutive weeks and peaked at number eight on the Swedish singles chart. In the UK, the song charted at number one-hundred-and-twenty-two on downloads. Back home in Finland, the song peaked at number eleven.

Following the Eurovision Song Contest, Pakarinen returned to her music and embarked upon her Lovers Tour, again playing to sell-out audiences and receiving positive reviews for her powerful voice and stage performances. On 17 October 2007 she appeared on the soundtrack of the Finnish film Musta Jää. Pakarinen sang the title song "Black Ice", for which she made a music video to promote the film.

==== 2008: Love in a Million Shades ====
Following her highly successful Lovers album, Pakarinen took a break from the music industry in order to write material for her fourth studio album. In late 2008, Pakarien released "Make Believe" as the first single from her upcoming fourth studio album, Love In A Million Shades, the title of which was announced true her official Myspace. After almost two years since the appearance of her third album, Love In A Million Shades was released on 14 January 2009. Having taken a creative step away from the rock-image of her previous album Lovers, Love In A Million Shades debuted and peaked at number 7 on the Finnish albums chart, her first release to peak outside the top three.

The second single, "Shout It Out Loud" however, peaked at number 2 on the singles chart, her highest position since her debut, "Love Is Like A Song". The album sold 7,000 copies and was the first album by Pakarinen not to be certified. However, her record label Sony BMG stated that the drop in sales was expected due to the growing digital age throughout the world, before going on to say they believed Pakarinen's career could easily last well over another decade. The title-track, "Love In A Million Shades" was also released as the second single in late February and was accompanied by a music video, her first since "Black Ice" over a year earlier. In mid-2009 Pakarinen completed her fourth national tour, supporting her fourth studio album. Unlike her previous tours however, the Love In A Million Shades Tour played small, intimate venues.

==== 2010–present: Paperimiehen tytär ====
In 2010, she recorded her first album in Finnish Paperimiehen Tytär, which includes the singles Paperimiehen Tytär, Miehet, and Se yksi ainoa.

== Discography ==
Awards and achievements
Preceded by First	Idol (Finland) winner 2004	Succeeded by Ilkka Jääskeläinen
Preceded by Lordi with Hard Rock Hallelujah	Finland in the Eurovision Song Contest; 2007	Succeeded by Teräsbetoni with Missä miehet ratsastaa
