= Martti Saarinen =

Finnish singer (born 1980)

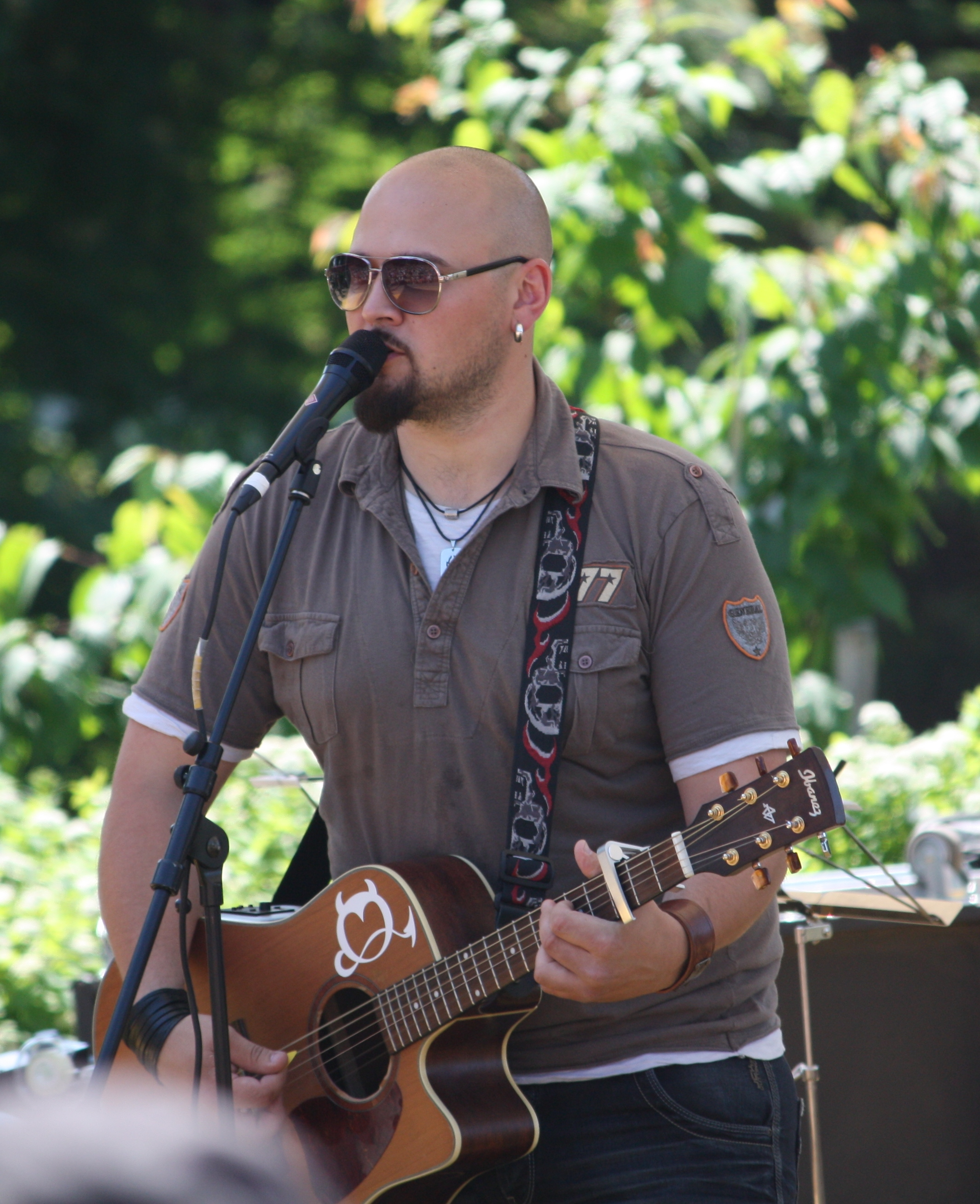
- Martti Saarinen performing on Aurinkomäki stage in June 2011

Background information
- Born: October 20, 1980 (age 45)
- Origin: Tuusula, Finland
- Occupation: Singer
- Instruments: Vocals, guitar
- Years active: 2005–present
- Labels: Sony Music (2011–present)

Martti Saarinen (born 20 October 1980 in Tuusula, Finland) is a Finnish singer and the winner of the fifth series of the Idols in 2011.

In the last final of Idols Saarinen got 56% of the votes. Ali Elkharam was second. The winner's song was "Se alkaa taas". His debut album, Martti Saarinen, was released in 2011.
