= Kristiina Brask =

Finnish pop singer

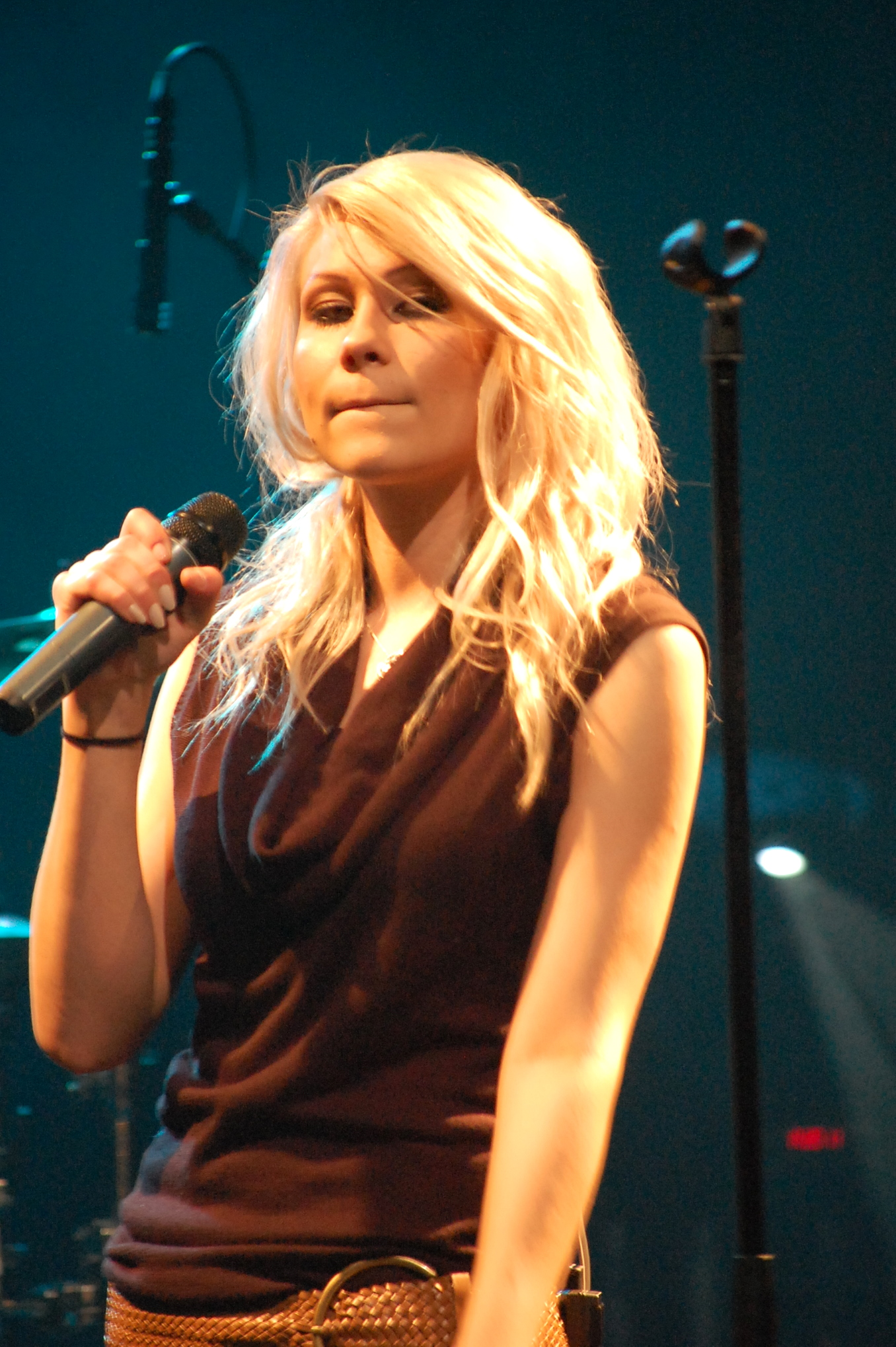
Kristiina Brask, 2008

Kristiina Maria Brask (born 2 June 1990) is a Finnish pop singer. She was a finalist in the third season of Idols in 2007. She was placed third after Ari Koivunen and Anna Abreu.

Soon after Idols participation, Kristiina made a recording contract with Helsinki Music Company. Her debut album, Silmät sydämeeni, was released in November 2007. It has sold more than 15 000 copies (gold). Four singles, "Nyt mä meen", "Silmät sydämeeni", "Pilvet valmiina" and "Liian kaukana", have been released.

Brask's second album, called Kuivilla susta, was released on 9 September 2009.

In addition to music, Brask loves ice hockey. She comes from Sorsakoski, Leppävirta, and studies in a music-based high school in Kuopio.

== Discography ==
Albums

- Silmät sydämeeni (7 November 2007)
- Kuivilla Susta (9 September 2009)

Singles

- Nyt mä meen (10 October 2007)
- Silmät sydämeeni
- Pilvet valmiina
- Liian kaukana
- Kuivilla Susta* (5 June 2009)
- Happee, Hoitoo ja Empatiaa

== Filmography ==
Year	Film	Role	Notes
2010	Despicable Me	Margo	Finnish voice-dub
2010	Marmaduke	Isabella	Finnish voice-dub
