= New Town (Koop Arponen album) =

Studio album by Koop Arponen
- Released: March 18, 2009
- Recorded: 2008–2009
- Label: Sony BMG
- Producers: Leri Leskinen; Patric Sarin

New Town is the first album by Koop Arponen, the winner of the 2008 Finnish Idols competition.

== Track listing ==
1. Every Song I Hear – 03:56
2. Everything I'm Not – 04:05
3. Sweet Words and a Lonely Night Away – 03:33
4. Innocent Eyes – 3:53
5. Love Is Cool (feat. Anna Puu) – 03:40
6. You're the Reason – 04:05
7. Broadway Sky – 03:50
8. Loosing You [sic] – 02:56
9. I Don't Regret Anything – 03:32
10. Voices of the Past – 04:21
11. Insomnia – 03:33

== Charts ==
Chart (2009)	Peak position
Finnish Albums Chart	1
