= Pihasoittajat =

Finnish folk music band

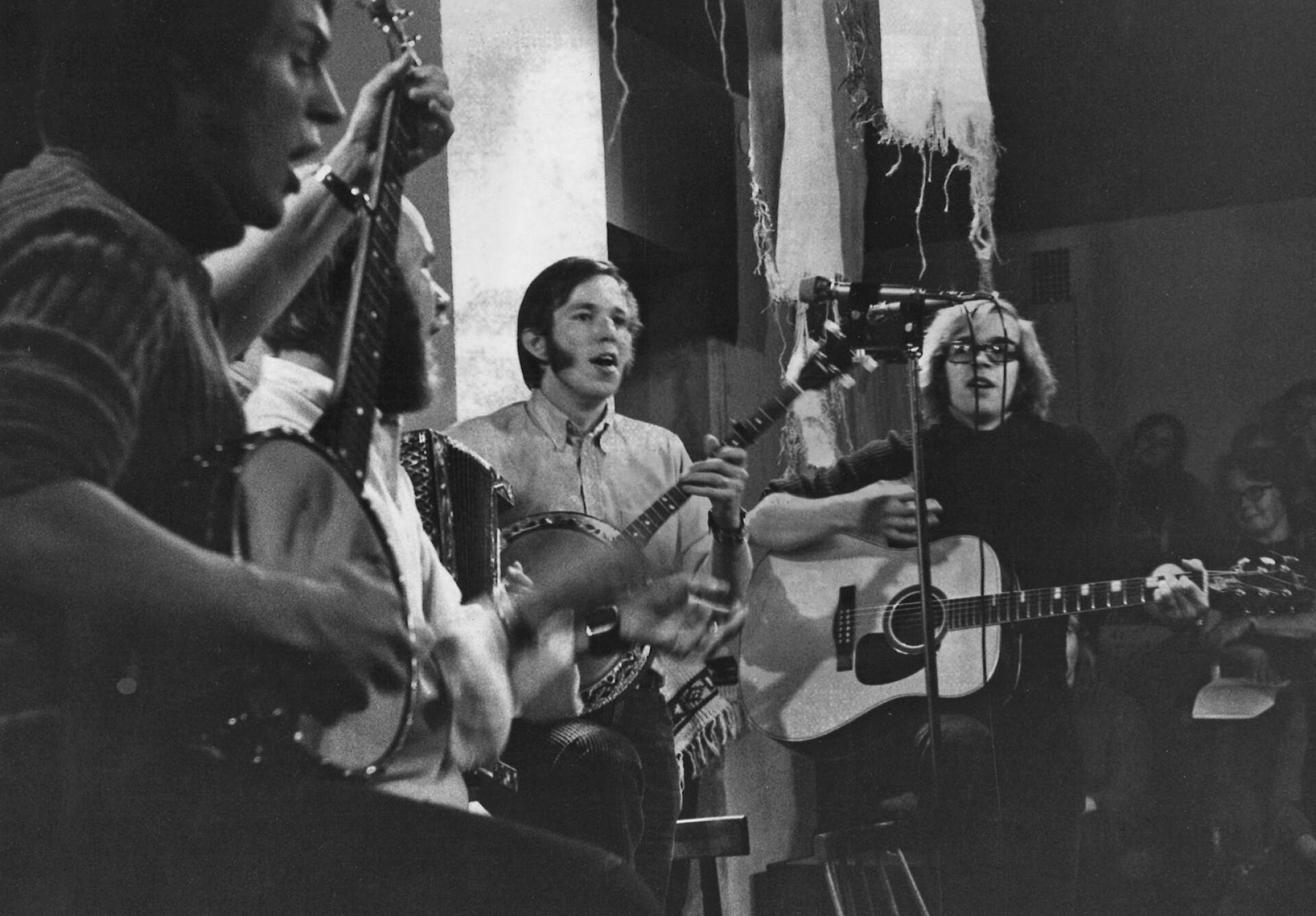
Pihasoittajat in 1972.

Pihasoittajat (1969 to 1975) was a Finnish folk music band with modern popular music influences.

== History ==
Pihasoittajat was founded in 1969 in Finland as an Irish folk music band. The group's founding members included Henrik Bergendahl, Kim Kuusi, Hannu Karlsson, Harry Lindahl, and Kyösti Pärssinen. All of them had played together in various lineups before. At the beginning, Riitta and Petri Hohenthal were also part of Pihasoittajat. Their involvement ended when Petri left to join a different band named Cumulus.

In Fall of 1971, Pihasoittajat collaborated with the Ryhmäteatteri to create a musical documentary, "Vanha iloinen Irlanti," narrating the history of the Ireland. This documentary became very popular, leading to a Swedish-language TV version and a record deal with Love Records. The 1972 debut album, "Kivinen tie Dubliniin - Rocky Road to Dublin," featured Irish folk music sung in English. Pihasoittajat's success inspired the formation of several skilled Irish folk music groups in Finland.

MTV named Pihasoittajat the Band of the Year in 1972.

Afterwards, Pihasoittajat expanded into Finnish folk music and their own compositions. Their second album, "Hattukauppiaan aamu," was entirely in Finnish, and included songs like "Pieni kesäruno" and "Puutarhurin laulu," set to the poetry of Viljo Kajava and Aale Tynni. Arja Karlsson joined as the lead vocalist. Pekka Pohjola played bass on a few tracks.

Pihasoittajat participated in the Finnish Eurovision Song Contest qualifiers in 1975 with Kim Kuusi's composition, "Viulu-ukko." The song won the Finnish qualifiers, and Pihasoittajat represented Finland at the Eurovision Song Contest 1975, finishing seventh.

The same year, Pihasoittajat released their last album, "Kontaten kotia." All the compositions were by Kim Kuusi. The album contained Kuusi's compositions based on the poems of Finnish poets Aale Tynni and Martti Haavio (P. Mustapää), as well as his arrangements of Finnish folk songs. "Viulu-ukko," was also included in the album.

Pihasoittajat returned after a 20-year hiatus in 1995, with Sara Puljula joining as the bassist. They performed at events like the Kaustinen festival, in Moscow, and at the Great Folk Concert at Savoy Theatre in 1999. This second phase ended with the death of Hannu Karlsson in 2000.

After a few years of inactivity, Pihasoittajat became active again in 2009 following a wedding performance in Ireland. The lineup was complemented by the addition of Henrik's son, Tommi Bergendahl.

In recent years, Pihasoittajat has performed infrequently, mostly at private events. In the summer of 2016, they performed at the Mummi-Kutoo-Takaisin mini-festival in Humppila, and in November, they performed at Savoy Theatre. The lineup was completed by Jenni Bergendahl, Arja's daughter and Tommi's wife. Bassist help has sometimes been provided by Kyösti's brother, Hannu ("Tunnu"), with other family members occasionally joining in.

== Discography ==
=== CD Releases ===
- Hattukauppiaan Aamu / Rocky Road to Dublin (1972)
- Kontaten kotia (1975)

=== Vinyl Releases ===
- Kivinen tie Dubliniin / Rocky Road to Dublin (1971)
- Hattukauppiaan Aamu (1973)

Preceded by Carita with Keep Me Warm	Finland in the Eurovision Song Contest; 1975	Succeeded by Fredi & Ystävät with Pump-Pump
