= Jani Wickholm =

Finnish pop and rock singer (1977–2026)

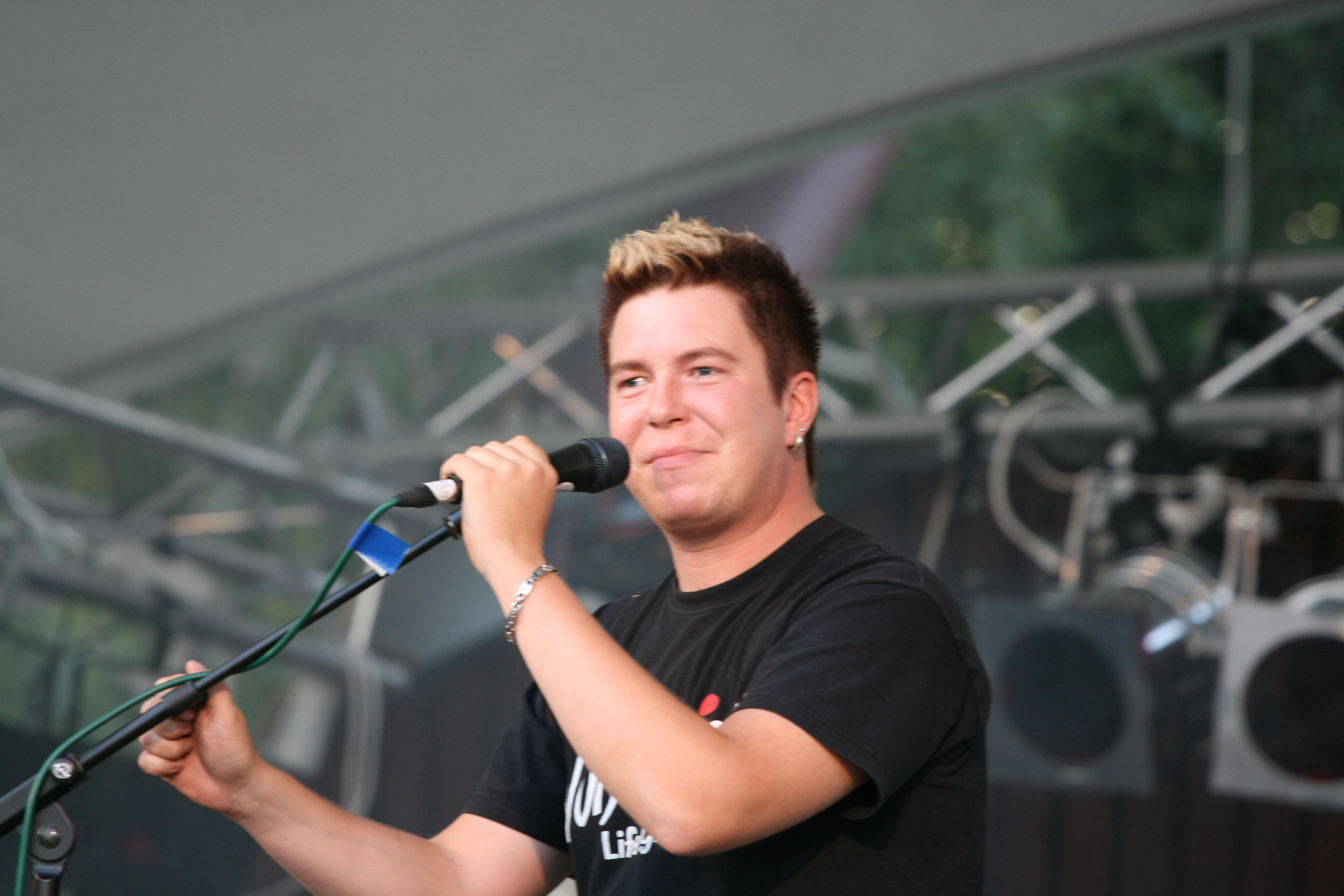
Wickholm in 2007

Jani Wickholm (20 September 1977 – 23 June 2026) was a Finnish pop and rock singer. He came in second place on the Finnish MTV3 show Finnish Idols in 2004 after Hanna Pakarinen. Both Wickholm and Pakarinen had previously worked as forklift operators.

Wickholm's albums have been comparably successful to the albums of Hanna Pakarinen. His debut album Kaikki muuttuu (Everything changes) topped the Finnish album chart. Wickholm's second album Alumiinitähdet (Aluminium stars) stayed on the chart for three weeks.

Wickholm was born in Kerava. He lived in Jämsä's Koskenpää in 2012. Wickholm died on 23 June 2026, at the age of 48. While the cause of death is unknown, Wichkholm was diagnosed with cirrhosis in 2017 and was recovered for psychiatric disorders in 2024.

== Discography ==
=== Albums ===
- Kaikki muuttuu (Everything changes) (2004)
- Alumiinitähdet (Aluminium stars) (2005)
- Yhden lauseen mies (Man of one sentence) (2007)
- Ranta-ahon valot (2008)
- Jouluksi kotiin (2008)
- Aivan eri mies (2012)
- Sininen tie (2015)

=== Singles ===
- "Hukun (I'm drowning)" (2004)
- "Kaikki muuttuu (Everything changes)" (2004) (promo)
- "Siivet (Wings)" (2004) (promo)
- "Langennut sinuun (Fallen for you)" (2004) (promo)
- "Alumiinitähdet (Aluminium stars)" (2005) (promo)
- "Suomenneito (Maid of Finland)" (2005) (promo)
- "Kuu (The moon)" (2007) (promo)
- "Jukeboksin runoilija (Jukebox's poet)" (2007) (promo)

=== Music videos ===
- "Kaikki muuttuu"
- "Suomenneito"
