= Jani Toivola =

Finnish actor and politician (born 1977)

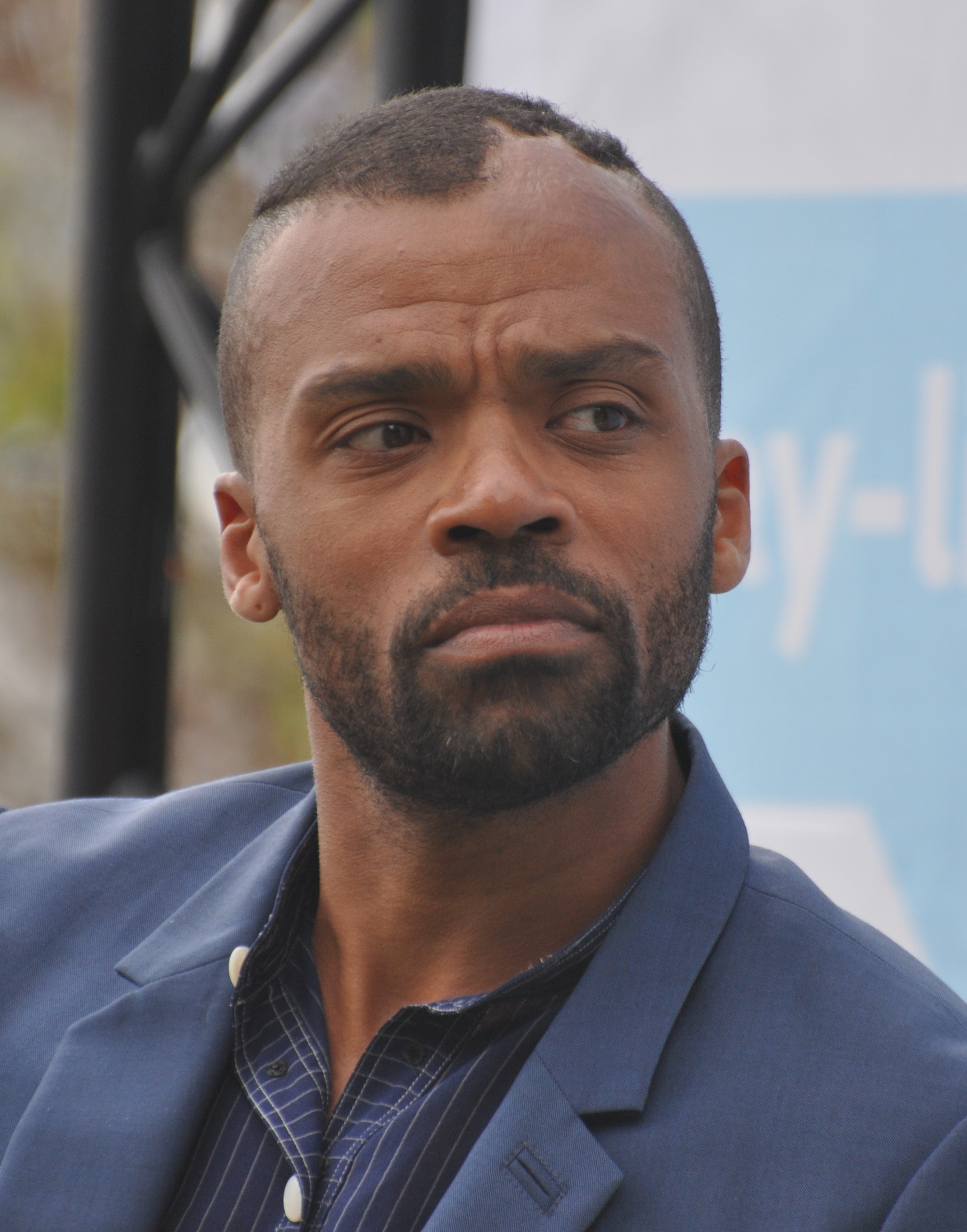
- Toivola in 2015

Member of the Finnish Parliament for Uusimaa
- In office 2011–2019

Personal details
- Born: 27 November 1977 (age 48) Vaasa, Finland
- Party: Green League
- Occupation: Actor, dancer
- Website: http://janitoivola.net

Jani Petteri Toivola (born 27 November 1977) is a Finnish actor, dancer, author and an ex-politician. He studied in HB Acting Studio, New York City in 1999–2002. He has performed in several dance works, television series and plays. Toivola is also openly gay. His father is Kenyan and his mother is Finnish.

Toivola has been a veejay for the chart programme of the music channel The Voice. He has also so far hosted the third and fourth season of the Finnish Idols television series together with Ellen Jokikunnas.

In the Finnish parliamentary election of 2011, Toivola was elected to the Parliament of Finland as a candidate of the Green League. He was the first Finnish Black MP. In 2018 he announced that he would not run for a third term.

== Filmography ==
- Kuilu mielessä, (2003)
- Käenpesä, TV series (2005), as Samir Kibaki
- Meno-paluu, a travel programme (2005), host
- Ähläm Sähläm, TV series (2006), as Heikki
- Osasto 5, TV series (2006), as Ahmed Mattila
- Idols, third season of TV series (2007), host
- Kaikki kunnossa, waiter in TV series (2007)
- Big Brother Extra, fifth season of TV series (2009), host

== Theatre ==
- Sorsastaja, Finnish National Theatre (2006)
- Hairspray, Helsinki City Theatre (2005)
- Hair, Peacock Theatre in Linnanmäki

== Biography ==
- Musta tulee isona valkoinen: Miten päästää irti pelosta ja häpeästä ja seistä omilla jaloillaan. Helsinki: Siltala, 2016. ISBN 978-952-234-358-1
- Kirja tytölleni. Helsinki: WSOY, 2018. ISBN 978-951-0-43060-6
- Poika ja hame. Kuvittanut Saara Obele. Helsinki: Otava, 2021 ISBN 978-951-1-38003-0
- Rakkaudesta. Helsinki: Kosmos, 2021.ISBN 978-951-1-38003-0
