= Agnes Pihlava =

Agnieszka Pihlava
- Also known as: Agnes
- Born: Agnieszka Pihlava; 19 March 1980 (age 46)
- Origin: Leszno, Greater Poland, Poland
- Genres: Acoustic, Classic rock, Hard rock, Rock
- Occupations: Singer, musician
- Instrument: Vocals
- Years active: 2005–present
- Website: agnespihlava.com

Agnieszka "Agnes" Pihlava (born Polish: Agnieszka Ćwiklińska; born 19 March 1980) is a singer who came fourth in Idols Finland 2, the Finnish version of Pop Idol in 2005. She was born in Leszno, Poland.

== Discography ==
=== Albums ===
- "Idols: Finalistit 2005"
- "When the Night Falls" (2006)
- "Redemption (2009)"

=== Singles ===
- "Haaveista totta" (2005)
- "I Thought We Were Lovers" (2006)
- "Danger in Love" [(2006) (Lyrics by Mr.Lordi from Lordi )]
