= Idols season 5 =

Idols
- Season 5
- Hosted by: Heikki Paasonen; Niina Herala; Janne Kataja (Idols Studio)
- Judges: Nina Tapio; Jone Nikula; Sami Pitkämö
- Winner: Martti Saarinen
- Runner-up: Ali Elkharam
- Finals venue: Hartwall Areena

Release
- Original network: MTV3
- Original release: February 3 – May 15, 2011

The fifth season of Finnish Idol premiered on February 3, 2011 on MTV3. Nina Tapio and Jone Nikula returned as judges, and Sami Pitkämö replaced Patric Sarin as a judge. Heikki Paasonen returned as the show's host, but his co-hosts from the previous season did not return as they were replaced by Niina Herala.

Idols tekee hyvää, a Finnish version of the hugely acclaimed American Idol Gives Back program, was held for the first time on April 24, 2011. The concert was hosted by Heikki Paasonen and Idols' original hostess Ellen Jokikunnas, who replaced Niina Herala for that one episode.

This season also includes a new show called Idols Studio, which replaces Idols Extra. Hosted by Idols Extra's earlier host Janne Kataja, the show includes conversations with varying guests. The show is aired on Saturday evenings at 7:30 pm (earlier 6:30 pm) EET on MTV3.

== Regional auditions ==
Episode Air Date	Audition City	Date	Audition Venue	Golden Tickets
February 3, 2011	Kuopio	October 19–20, 2010	Kuopion musiikkikeskus	15
February 6, 2011	Rovaniemi	October 26–27, 2010	Rovaniemen kaupungintalo	9
February 10/13, 2011	Tampere	December 3–4, 2010	Tampere Hall	27
February 17/20, 2011	Helsinki	December 18–19, 2010	Tapahtumatalo Bank	28
Total Golden Tickets				79

== Elimination Chart ==
There were twelve semifinalists, six females and males.

Legend
Top 12	Winner

Safe	Eliminated	Bottom 4

Stage:		Semi-Finals						Finals				
Week:		3/6	3/10	3/13	3/17	3/20	3/24	4/3	4/10	4/17	5/1	5/8
Place	Contestant	Result										
1	Martti Saarinen						Bottom 4					Winner
2	Ali Elkharam											Elim
3	Hennariikka Syvänne										Elim	
4	Ilpo Kaikkonen									Elim		
5	Stina Girs						Bottom 4		Elim			
6	Lotta Sandholm							Elim				
7–8	Jerkka Virtanen						Elim					
7–8	Fatima Koroma						Elim					
9	Jusu Wirekoski				Elim							
10	Anna Paatero			Elim								
11	Vilikasper Kanth		Elim									
12	Laura Itkonen	Elim										

- Lassi Valtonen was selected as one of the semi-finalists, but he decided to withdraw. He was replaced by a new competitor (Vilikasper Kanth), which was selected 10 March 2011.
