= Koop Arponen =

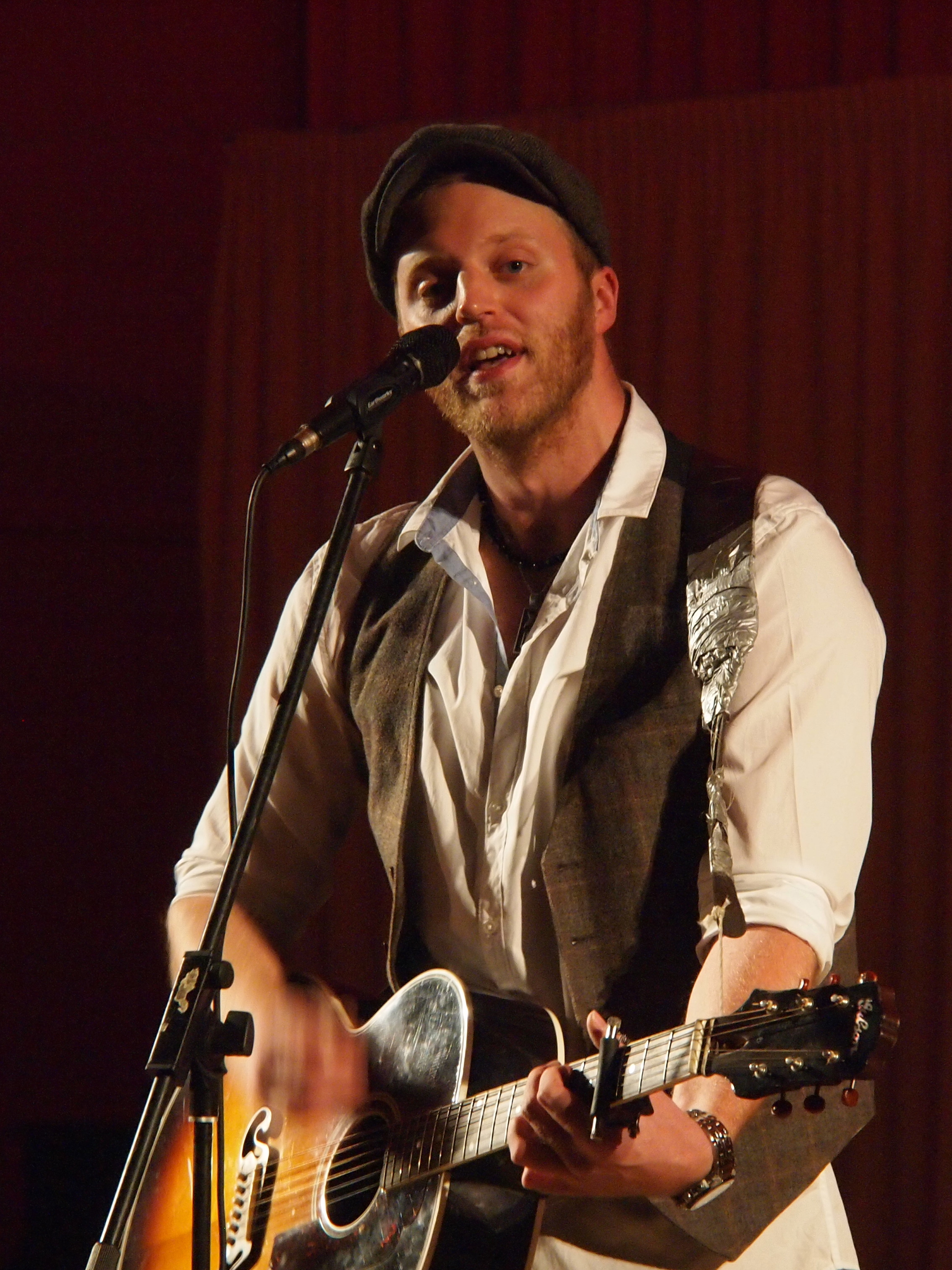
- Koop Arponen at Kotka concert hall 9.11.2012

Background information
- Born: Koop Juho Alexander Arponen; 20 April 1984 (age 42)
- Origin: Lappeenranta, Finland
- Genres: Pop; Rock
- Occupations: Singer, Songwriter
- Instruments: Vocals, Guitar, Piano
- Years active: 2008–present
- Label: Sony Music (2008–2010)

Koop Juho Alexander Arponen (born 20 April 1984 in Lappeenranta, Finland) is a Finnish singer and the winner of the fourth series of the Idols in 2008.

== Biography ==
Koop Arponen was born in Lappeenranta, Eastern Finland to a Finnish father and a Dutch mother.
When he was two, his family moved to Belgium and to England a few years later where he attended Cheam High School in Cheam, Greater London, between 1995 and 2002. He was elected as Head Boy of the School in 2001, his final year of sixth form. At the age of five he started to play the piano, but quit 6 years later. At the age of 16 he started to play it again and also started to compose music. While doing his national service at the Finnish Army, he learnt to play the guitar.
In England he studied at the University of Hull Scarborough Campus and graduated with a BA degree in Creative Music Technology with Business Management.> He also used to play in local pubs and clubs.

Arponen's father died in 2008, and after that he moved back to Finland to his grandmother's, who lives in the village of Pihlajavesi in Keuruu.

Arponen has a son, born in 2016, with his British wife Cordelia, whom he married in 2014. They live in London, England.

== Idols ==
In August 2008 Arponen took part in the Finnish version of Pop Idol, Idols (Finland). Nevertheless, the 18-year-old Pete Parkkonen was the favourite until he was dropped in the penultimate competition.
In the final, Arponen got 70,3% of the votes. Anna Puustjärvi was second. The winner's song, Insomnia debuted at number one on the Official Finnish Album Chart. After the victory he received media's interest in his mother's home country the Netherlands and his former place of residence, England. In 2009 Arponen toured Finland with the semifinalists of that Idols-season. His debut album New Town was released on 18 March 2009, and entered the Official Finnish Album Chart at number one.

== Early career ==
In the spring and summer 2009 Arponen toured Finland extensively, and in October 2009 he released I Love It When I See You Smile, a song he wrote for the breast cancer charity foundation Pink Ribbon. He donated his royalties from the song to the charity and Samsung also donated a percentage of the purchase price to the foundation. Arponen's second album Bright Lights was released on 24 March 2010.

== Flute of Shame ==
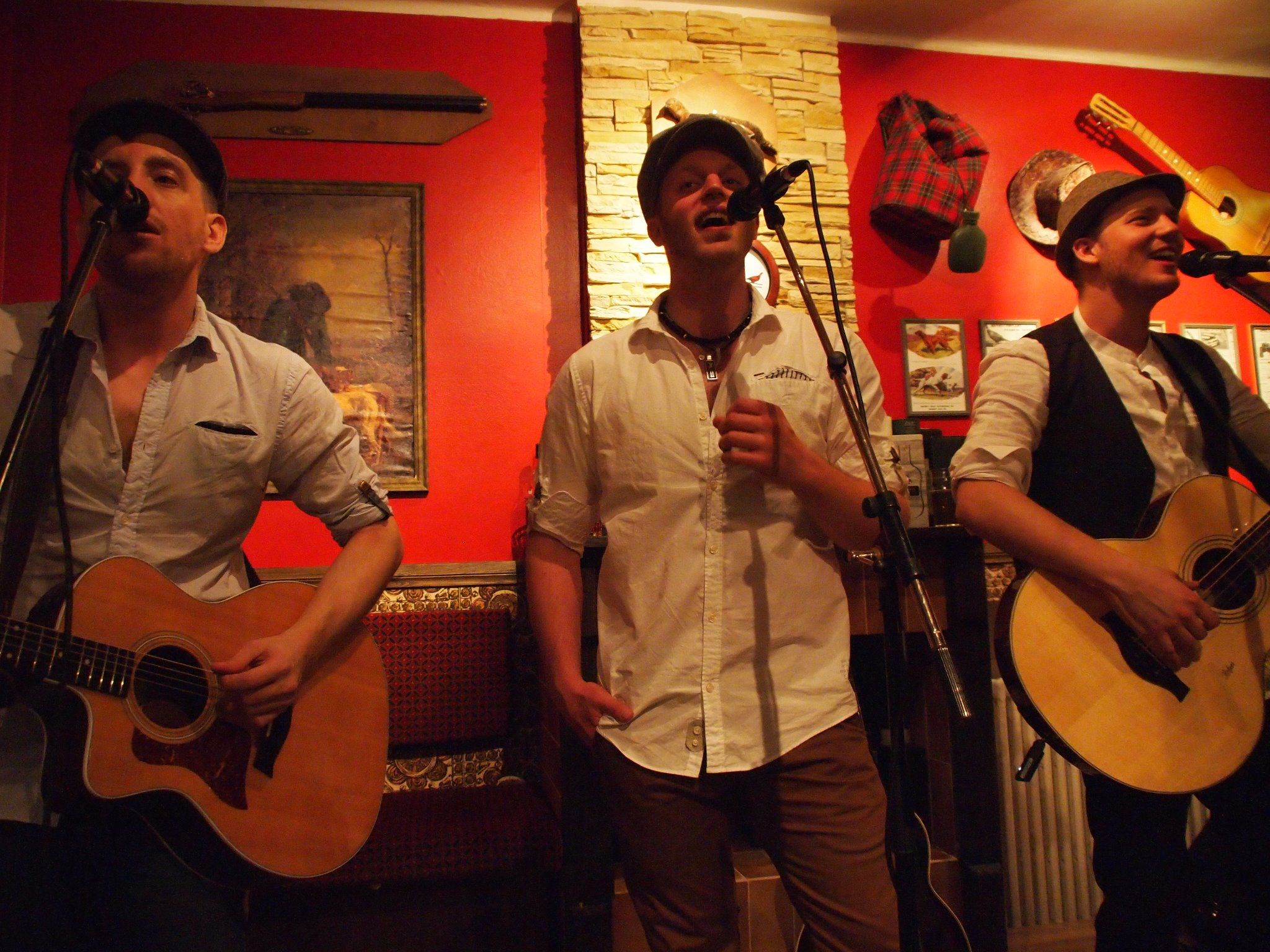
Flute of Shame at pub Maltainen Riekko in Helsinki 31.3.2012

In early 2010 Arponen and two other musicians, James Lascelles and Dane Stefaniuk formed an acoustic three piece band called Flute of Shame . The group have already toured in Finland and parts of Spain and Britain. In 2011 they represented Finland at the international New Wave Song Contest in Latvia, where they won the Alla Pugachova Golden Star Award for best original song.

They are currently working on their second EP, having released their first EP 'Coming Home' on 2 July 2012.

== Discography ==
=== Albums ===
- New Town (Koop Arponen album) (2009)
- Bright Lights (Koop Arponen album)(2010)

=== EPs ===
- Coming Home (Flute of Shame EP, 2.7.2012)
- These Hands (Flute of Shame EP, 7.6.2013)

=== Singles ===
- Insomnia (2008)
- Every Song I Hear... (2009)
- Innocent Eyes (2009)
- I Love It When I See You Smile (2009)
- Cold (2010)
- Young And Foolish (2010)
- Pictures On My Wall (2011)
