= Katri Ylander =

Finnish singer

Katri Marianne Ylander (born 17 December 1985) is a Finnish singer who rose to popularity after finishing second in Idols Finland 2, the Finnish version of Pop Idol. Ylander received 45% of votes, while the winner, Ilkka Jääskeläinen, received the other 55%. She released her first album in June 2006, releasing a hit single soon afterwards, "Onko Vielä Aikaa?" ("Is there still time?"), which reached number one on the Finnish Radio Top 20 list in the week of 2 August.

Ylander was born in Harjavalta, Finland.

== Discography ==
Katri Ylander discography
- Studio albums: 3
- Singles: 10
- Music videos: 6
- Tours: 2

=== Albums ===
Year	Information	Finland	Sales and Certifications
2006	Katri Ylander: First studio album; Released: 14 June 2006; Label: RCA Records; Format: CD, Digital Download	3	^{Finnish sales: 25,000; IFPI: Gold}
2007	Kaikki nämä sanat All These Words: Second studio album; Released: 31 October 2007; Label: RCA Records; Format: CD, Digital Download	13	^{Finnish sales: 17,000; IFPI: Gold}
2009	Valvojat; Overseen: Third studio album; Released: 2 September 2009; Label: RCA Records; Format: CD, Digital Download	6	^{Finnish sales: 4,000; IFPI: N/A}
2013	Uusi maa New Land: Fourth studio album; Released: 13 September 2013; Label: fi:Suomen Musiikki; Format: CD, Digital Download	35	

=== Singles ===
Year	Title	Chart positions		Certification	Album
Year	Title	Finland Singles	Finland Digital	Certification	Album
2006	"Onko vielä aikaa?"	—	—	—	Katri Ylander
2006	"Mansikkamäki"	—	—	—	Katri Ylander
2006	"Vuorollaan"	—	—	—	Katri Ylander
2007	"Aamuaurinkoon"	—	—	—	Katri Ylander
2007	"Valehdellaan"	12	10	—	Kaikki nämä sanat
2007	"Välitunnilla"	10	8	Gold	Kaikki nämä sanat
2008	"Unta"	—	20	—	Kaikki nämä sanat
2008	"Kaikki nämä sanat"	—	—	—	Kaikki nämä sanat
2009	"Maailman ihanin"	—	—	—	Valvojat
2009	"Nyt"	—	—	—	Valvojat
2009	"Valvojat"	—	—	—	Valvojat

== Idols Finland 2 Performances ==
Tampere Auditions: "Almaz" by Randy Crawford
Semi Finals: "Piste" by Stella
Top 7: "Saving All My Love for You" by Whitney Houston
Top 6: "The Final Countdown" by Europe
Top 5: "Kuurupiiloa" by Irina
Top 5: "Solitary Motions" by Emmi
Top 4: "Do You Know Where You're Going To?" by Diana Ross
Top 4: "Yes Sir, I Can Boogie" by Baccara
Top 3: "We Are" by Ana Johnsson
Top 3: "I'm with You" by Avril Lavigne
Top 3: "Älä Sano Mitään" by Irina
Grand Final: "Unohda En"
Grand Final: "Don't Speak" by No Doubt
Grand Final: "Piste" by Stella
Grand Final: "Total Eclipse of the Heart" by Bonnie Tyler
