= Roni Tran Binh Trong =

Finnish singer of Vietnamese ancestry (born 1987)

Roni Tran
- Born: 1987 (age 37–38); Thailand
- Origin: Finland
- Genres: Pop
- Years active: 2006–present
- Labels: Sony-BMG
- Website: Official site

Roni Trần Bình Trong is a Finnish singer of Vietnamese ancestry who rose to popularity after placing sixth in Idols Finland 2, the Finnish version of Pop Idol. He was born in a refugee camp in Thailand, but went to Finland at the age of four months, and has lived most of his life in Hyvinkää, Finland.

== Idols Finland 2 Performances ==
-Semi Finals: Separated by Usher
-Finals:
Top 7: I Still Haven't Found What I'm Looking For by U2
Top 6: Poison by Alice Cooper

== Discography ==
=== Albums ===
- Idols: Finalistit 2005
- Since 1987 (debut album, 2006)

01. Call Me
02. Don't Wanna B Alone
03. The Time Is Now
04. This Song
05. Hello
06. SMS
07. Never Coming Back
08. All I Want
09. Imagine
10. Reason
11. I Want To Know
12. Cry On Me

=== Singles ===
- "Don't Wanna B Alone" (2006)
- "Call Me" (2006)

=== Paris By Night Performances ===
- PBN 84 In Atlanta: Passport to Music and Fashion - "Call Me" (2006)
- PBN 87 Talent Show: Finals - "All I Want" and "Vang Trang Khoc [Vietnamese song]"(2007)
- PBN 89 In Korea - "Tan Bien w/ Huynh Gia Tuan" (July 2007)
