= Kim Kuusi =

Finnish composer (born 1947)

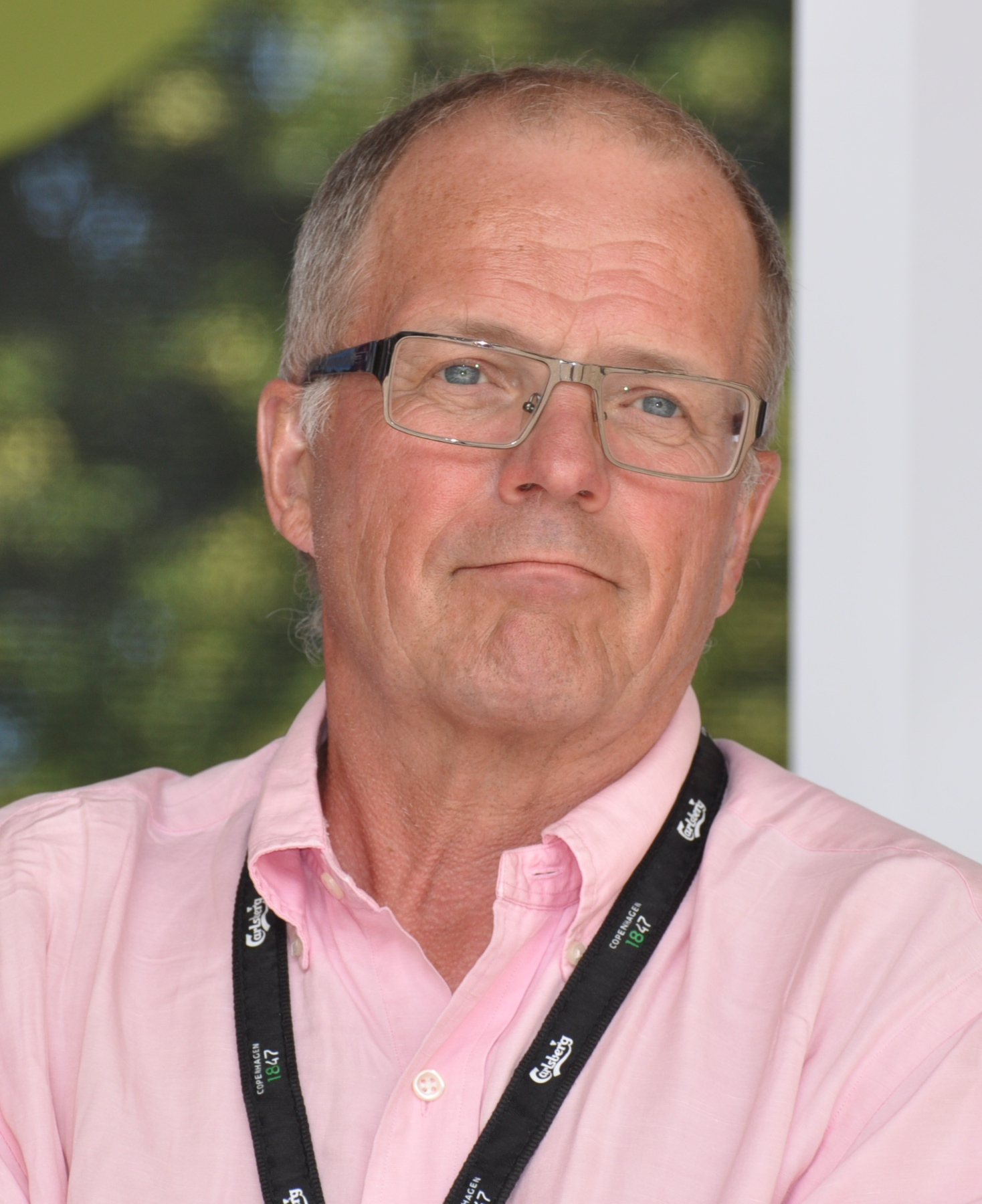
- Kim Kuusi in 2012

Background information
- Born: 28 December 1947 (age 78); Helsinki, Finland
- Occupations: Musician, composer
- Labels: Love; Finnlevy
- Formerly of: Ryhmäteatteri; Pihasoittajat
- Spouse: Maija Kuusi

Kim Kuusi (born 28 December 1947 in Helsinki) is a Finnish composer best known for his advertising jingles.

Kuusi studied at the Helsinki School of Economics, also teaching there in 1975. Alongside studying, Kuusi had been involved in the creation of Ryhmäteatteri as its composer and musician from 1969 to 1973. At the same time, he also performed in Pihasoittajat, for whom he wrote, among other things, the Finnish Eurovision entry in 1975, Old man fiddle.
