= Ilkka Jääskeläinen =

Finnish singer

Ilkka Aaron Jääskeläinen (born 10 November 1979) is a singer who rose to popularity after winning Idols Finland 2, the Finnish version of Pop Idol with a 55% majority of the vote over runner-up Katri Ylander.

Jääskeläinen's debut album "Vuosisadan rakkaustarina" (transl. Love Story of the Century) was released in 2006. There has been two top singles in this disc, "Unohda en" (I Won't Forget) and "Soita" (Call).

Jääskeläinen was born in Hämeenlinna. He belongs to Tampere Pentecostal Church and has also made some Christian children's TV programs. He is known as a humoristic joker.

Jääskeläinen originally auditioned with his brother Heikki Jääskeläinen but Heikki only made the second day of the theatre round.

== Idols Finland 2 performances ==
- Tampere Auditions: Hero by Mariah Carey
- Theatre Round Day 1: You're Still the One by Shania Twain
- Semi Finals: The Power Of Love by Celine Dion
- Top 7: I Was Made For Lovin" You by Kiss
- Top 6: Can't Stop Loving You by Van Halen
- Top 5: 1972 by Anssi Kela
- Top 5: Satuprinsessa by Tiktak
- Top 4: Cherish by Kool & the Gang
- Top 4: Stayin' Alive by Bee Gees
- Top 3: Left Outside Alone by Anastacia
- Top 3: Feel by Robbie Williams
- Top 3: Taivas Lyö Tulta by Teräsbetoni
- Grand Final: Unohda En
- Grand Final: This Love by Maroon 5
- Grand Final: The Power Of Love by Celine Dion
- Grand Final: Please Forgive Me by Bryan Adams

== Discography ==
=== Albums ===
- Idols: Finalistit 2005 (December 2005)
- Vuosisadan Rakkaustarina (March 2006)

=== Singles ===
- Unohda en(2006)
- Soita
- Vuosisadan Rakkaustarina (2006)
