= When I Become Me =

Studio album by Hanna Pakarinen
- Released: June 9, 2004
- Recorded: February – April 2004
- Genre: Pop, pop rock
- Length: 47:57
- Label: RCA
- Producer: Risto Asikainen, Rauli Eskolin, Patric Sarin

Hanna Pakarinen chronology
| When I Become Me (2004) | Stronger (2005) |

Singles from When I Become Me
- 1. "Love Is Like A Song" Released: January 2004; 2. "Fearless" Released: May 2004; 3. "How Can I Miss You?" Released: August 2004; 4. "When I Become Me" Released: January 2005

When I Become Me is the debut album by Finnish pop/pop rock singer and season one Idols winner Hanna Pakarinen, released in Finland by RCA on June 9, 2004. "Love Is Like A Song", Pakarinen's number one hit Idols coronation song is featured as a bonus track on the album. A cover of the Bryan Adams song "Heaven" is featured on the album.

The album debuted at number two on the Finnish albums chart and spent nine weeks inside the top three positions. In September 2004 it was certified platinum and is to date Pakarinen's highest-selling album with Finnish sales of 52,826 copies.

== Chart performance ==
When I Become Me entered the Finnish albums chart at number two in its first week, a position it held for five weeks. It spent a total of seventeen weeks on the chart, nine of which were within the top 3. In its fourth week on the chart it was certified platinum for sales in excess of 30,000.

| Chart | Peak position | Certification | Sales |
|---|---|---|---|
| Finnish Top 40 Albums | 2 | Platinum | 52,826 |

== Singles ==
- "Love Is Like A Song" was released as Pakarinen's winner's song after she was crowned as the first Finnish Idol in January 2004. The single debuted at number one on the official Finnish chart, a position it held for four weeks. It spent eleven weeks in the top 10 and was certified gold for the sale of 5,000 units.
- "Fearless" was released as a promotional single ahead of the album's release and as a result did not reach the Finnish singles chart.
- "How Can I Miss You?" was released as the third single from the album. Like its predecessor, it was released for promotional purposes only, though it was accompanied by a music video, Pakarinen's first since becoming a recording artist.
- "When I Become Me", the album's title track was released as the fourth and final single. It was used solely for promotional purposes and did not chart.

== Track listing ==
1. "When I Become Me" (Sarin) - 5:03
2. "Run" (Elofsson/Thornally/Venge/Wennerberg) - 3:12
3. "Fearless" (Finneide/Rydningen/Ziggy) - 3:21
4. "How Can I Miss You" (Röhr/Swede) - 3:59
5. "Ejected" (Asikainen) - 3:42
6. "Love's Run Over Me" (Asikainen) - 4:44
7. "Don't Hang Up" (Nylén/Rose) - 3:51
8. "Save My Life Tonight" (Fridh/Leonard) - 4:25
9. "Sorry" (Björk/Malm/Eklund) - 3:46
10. "Heaven" (Adams/Vallance) - 3:53
11. "Superhero" (Finneide/Eide) - 3:42
12. "Love Is Like A Song" [Bonus track] (Elofson/Kolehmainen/Lipp) - 4:02
