= Lovers (Hanna Pakarinen album) =

Studio album by Hanna Pakarinen
- Released: February 14, 2007 (Finland); May 23, 2007 (Europe)
- Recorded: October–December 2006
- Genre: Pop, rock
- Length: 47:01
- Label: RCA
- Producer: Teropekka Virtanen, Lasse Kurki, Rauli Eskolin

Hanna Pakarinen chronology
| Stronger (2005) | Lovers (2007) | Love In A Million Shades (2009) |

Singles from Lovers
- 1. "Go Go" Released: January 2007; 2. "Leave Me Alone" Released: March 2007; 3. "Hard Luck Woman" Released: May 2007

Lovers is the third studio album by Finnish singer Hanna Pakarinen, released in Finland by RCA on February 14, 2007. It was preceded by the lead single "Go Go" and also includes the singles "Leave Me Alone" and "Hard Luck Woman". "Leave Me Alone" served as Pakarinen's entry song in the 2007 Eurovision Song Contest finals, in which she placed 17th. Following Eurovision, the album was released throughout the rest of Europe on May 23, 2007, becoming Pakarinen's first album to receive a launch outside Finland.

The album peaked at number three on the Finnish albums chart, lower than her previous two albums. However, it spent over twice as long on the chart as her second album Lovers and after selling 15,000 copies across Finland, received gold certification.

== Commercial performance ==
Lovers debuted at number three in its first week of release, a position it held for a second consecutive week. It spent fifteen weeks on the Finnish albums chart and was accredited gold, with sales to date of 16,163. At its release, the album was Pakarinen's greatest critical success, with this being attributed to several factors, those most notable being Pakarinen's move into a much rockier image, her highly praised appearance in the 2007 Eurovision Song Contest, and her emergence as a songwriter, co-writing six of the eleven tracks on the album.

=== Chart performance ===
| Chart | Peak position | Certification | Sales |
|---|---|---|---|
| Finnish Top 40 Albums | 3 (2) | Gold | 16,163 |

=== Singles ===
- "Go Go" was released as the first single from the album, however it was used for promotion only, and as such did not chart. It was accompanied by a music video.
- "Leave Me Alone", the second single from Lovers became Pakarinen's first song to receive recognition outside Finland. Used as her entry song to the 2007 Eurovision Song Contest, it peaked at number 11 in Finland and number 8 in Sweden. It also charted at number 122 in the UK with her eurovision performance acting as its only promotion. To date it is Pakarinen's only single to chart outside her home country, and was the second song from Lovers to be accompanied by a music video. In Finland it was certified gold, selling over 5,000 copies.
- "Hard Luck Woman" was the third and final single to be released from the album. It was used for promotional purposes only and did not chart.

== Track listing ==
1. "It Ain't Me" (Magnusson/Rämström/Vuorinen) - 3:35
2. "Go Go" (Lofts/Wermerling) - 3:03
3. "Leave Me Alone" (Vuorinen/Huttunen/Pakarinen) - 3:34
4. "Tell Me What To Do" (Kurki/Pakarinen) - 3:53
5. "You Don't Even Know My Name" (Laine/Vuorinen) - 3:43
6. "Heart Beating Steady" (Kurki/Pakarinen) - 3:24
7. "Tears You Cry" (Korkeamäki/Kettunen) - 3:05
8. "Free" (Kurki/Pakarinen) - 3:33
9. "It Ain't Gonna Happen" (Korkeamäki/Pakarinen/Kettunen) - 3:09
10. "Lovers" (Laiho/Kurki/Pakarinen) - 3:48
11. "Hard Luck Woman" (Rake) - 4:18
12. "Stronger Without You" [European bonus track] (Landin/Larsson/Junior) - 3:27
13. "Love Is Like A Song" [European bonus track] (Elofson/Kolehmainen/Lipp) - 4:02
