= Paperimiehen Tytär =

Studio album by Hanna Pakarinen
- Released: October 20, 2010
- Recorded: April – July 2010
- Studios: Sonic Pump Studios, Finnvox Studios, Lo-Hi Studio
- Genres: Pop, rock
- Label: RCA
- Producer: Markus Koskinen

Hanna Pakarinen chronology
Love In A Million Shades (2009)	Paperimiehen Tytär (2010)

Singles from Paperimiehen Tytär
- 1. "Paperimiehen Tytär" Released: 30 August 2010; 2. "Se Yksi Ainoa" Released: 17 March 2011; 3. "Miehet" Released: 18 March 2011

Paperimiehen Tytar ("The Papermaker's Daughter") is the fifth studio album by Finnish singer Hanna Pakarinen, released in Finland by RCA on October 20, 2010. The album marks Pakarinen's first Finnish-language album, with her previous four albums all consisting of songs in English. It was preceded by the title single "Paperimiehen Tytär".

== Chart performance ==
Chart	Peak position	Sales
Finnish Top 40 Albums	9	3,000

== Singles ==
- "Paperimiehen Tytär", the title track and lead single from the album was given to Finland's Radio Nova on August 16, 2010, and released digitally on August 30.

== Track listing ==
1. "Prinsessa Armaada" (A Princess, Through and Through) 5:08
2. "Sinut Kokonaan" (Completely You) 3:37
3. "Se Yksi Ainoa" (The One and Only) 3:23
4. "Hetken Pieni Liekki" (A Tiny, Momentary Flame) 4:20
5. "Yksinäinen Morsian" (The Lonely Bride) 4:18
6. "Kolme Pientä Sanaa" (Three Little Words) 4:26
7. "Miehet" (Men) 3:00
8. "Paperimiehen Tytär" (The Papermaker's Daughter) 3:28
9. "Maailman Ihanin Mies" (The Most Wonderful Man in the World) 4:03
10. "Miten Pilviin Piirretään" (How to Draw in The Clouds) 3:55
11. "Nyt On Mun Vuoro" (Now It's My Turn) 4:45
