= Love in a Million Shades =

Studio album by Hanna Pakarinen
- Released: January 14, 2009
- Recorded: July – September 2008
- Genre: Pop rock
- Label: RCA
- Producer: Jyrki Tuovinen, Lasse Kurki, Janne Halmkrona, Sami Pitkämö, Patric Sarin

Hanna Pakarinen chronology
Lovers (2007)	Love in a Million Shades (2009)	Paperimiehen Tytär (2010)

Singles from Love in a Million Shades
- 1. "Make Believe" Released: 16 October 2008; 2. "Shout It Out Loud" Released: 7 January 2009; 3. "Love in a Million Shades" Released: 2 March 2009; 4. "Rescue Me" Released: 27 April 2009

Love in a Million Shades is the fourth studio album by Finnish singer Hanna Pakarinen, released in Finland by RCA Records on January 14, 2009. It was preceded by the single "Make Believe" and followed by the singles "Shout It Out Loud", "Love in a Million Shades", and "Rescue Me".

The album debuted and peaked at number seven on the Finnish albums chart. It spent nearly two months on the chart and sold 7,000 copies. It is Pakarinen's first album to not receive a gold or platinum certification.

== Chart performance ==
Love in a Million Shades debuted at number seven in its first week of release and spent five weeks on the chart in Finland. It sold 7,000 copies and, to date, is Pakarinen's only album not to achieve gold status (15,000 copies sold).

Chart	Peak position	Sales
Finnish Top 40 Albums	7	7,000

== Singles ==
- "Make Believe", the first single from the album received only a promotional release, a move previously seen with "Go Go" from Pakarinen's third album Lovers. The single therefore did not chart.
- "Shout It Out Loud" was the album's second single and was the first (and only) single from the album to receive a full commercial release. It peaked at number two on the Finnish singles chart, Pakarinen's highest entry since her debut single, "Love Is Like a Song", in 2004.
- The album's title track was the third single. It was released as a promotional single and accompanied by a music video, Pakarinen's first in almost two years.
- "Rescue Me" was the fourth and final single released from the album. It was released only to promote the album's supportive tour and, as a result, did not chart. It was co written by UK songwriter Tara McDonald.

== Track listing ==
1. "Almost Real"
2. "Shout It Out Loud"
3. "When We Hear Hallelujah"
4. "Liar"
5. "Rescue Me"
6. "A Thief That Holds My Heart"
7. "Love in a Million Shades"
8. "Make Believe"
9. "Lover, Friend or Foe"
10. "Maybe It's a Good Thing"
11. "Better Off Alone" [digital download bonus track]
