= Kristian Meurman =

Finnish singer (born 1979)

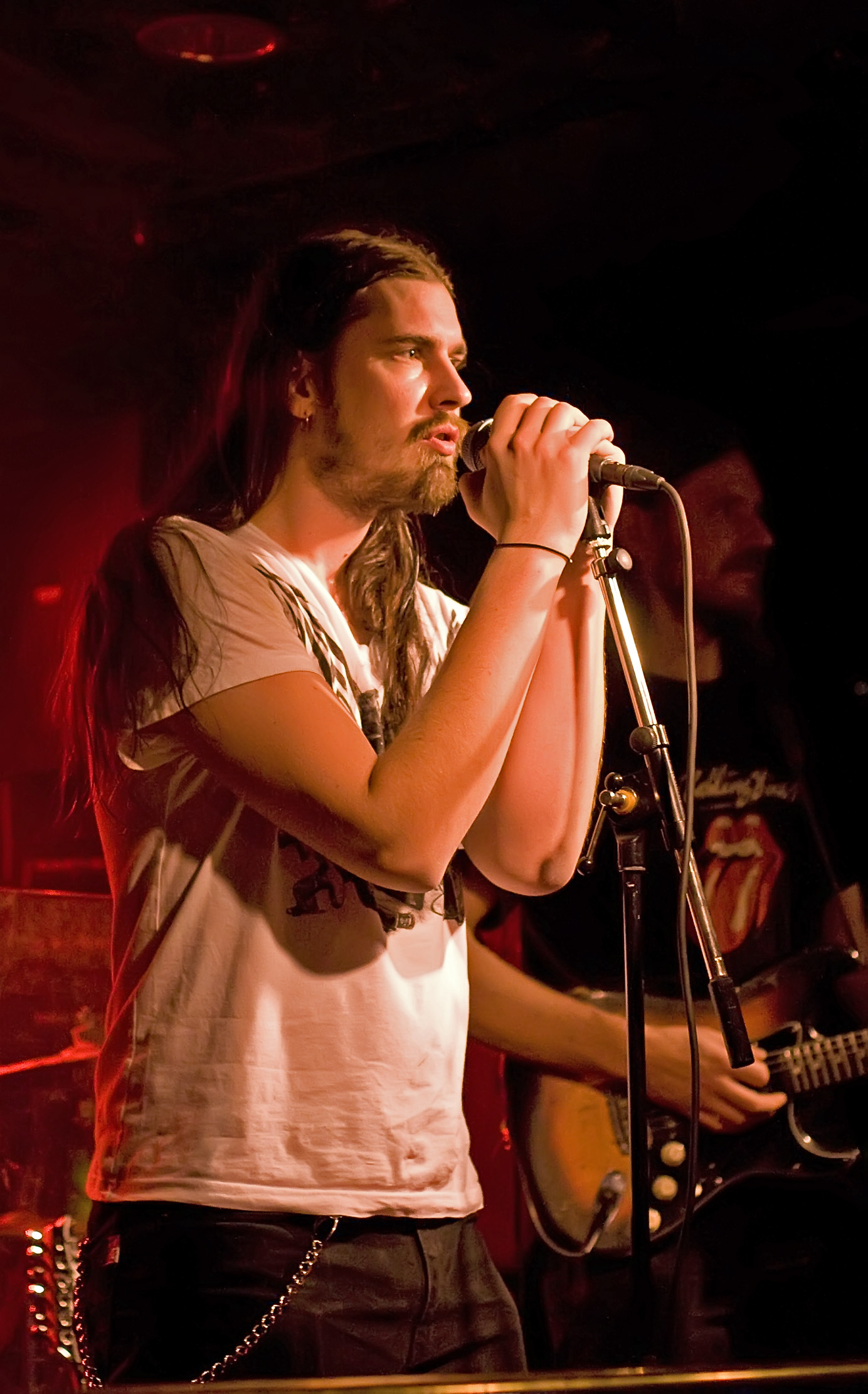
Kristian Meurman during a concert

Kristian Meurman (born 6 November 1979 in Espoo), is a Finnish singer. He was a finalist in the third series of the Finnish Idols in 2007. His first album Ensiaskeleet (translation: The first steps) was released in 2007. He also participated in the qualifying of the Eurovision Song Contest 2008 with a song called "Jos en sua saa" (translation: If I can't have you).
