= Stronger (Hanna Pakarinen album) =

Studio album by Hanna Pakarinen
- Released: September 7, 2005
- Recorded: June – July 2005
- Genre: Pop, pop rock
- Length: 41:33
- Label: RCA
- Producer: Anssi Kippo

Hanna Pakarinen chronology
When I Become Me (2004)	Stronger (2005)	Lovers (2007)

Singles from Stronger
- 1. "Kiss Of Life" Released: August 2005; 2. "Stronger Without You" Released: October 2005; 3. "Damn You" Released: December 2005

Stronger is the second album by Finnish pop/pop rock singer Hanna Pakarinen, released in Finland by RCA on September 7, 2005. The album was preceded by the lead single "Kiss Of Life" in August 2005 and followed later in the year by promotional singles "Stronger Without You" and "Damn You". "Run", a popular song from her debut album was also included as a bonus track.

The album peaked at number two on the Finnish albums chart and in November 2005 was certified gold, with sales to date of 16,473 copies.

== Chart performance ==
Stronger debuted and peaked at number two in its first week of release, the same peak position as Pakarinen's first album When I Become Me. Unlike its predecessor however, Stronger held the number two spot for only one week, dropping to numbers six and ten in its second and third weeks on the official Top 40. It spent a total of seven weeks on the chart, ten weeks less than Pakarinen's debut. However it continued to sell steadily even when outside the Top 40, and in November 2005 was officially awarded gold status for sales in excess of 15,000 units.

Chart	Peak position	Certification	Sales
Finnish Top 40 Albums	2	Gold	16,473

== Singles ==
- "Kiss of Life", the lead single from the album debuted and peaked at number four on the Finnish singles chart, becoming her second top five single after the number one hit "Love Is Like A Song" in January 2004.
- "Stronger Without You" was released as the second single for the album. Used for promotional purposes only, it did not chart but was accompanied by a music video.
- "Damn You", the third and final single also received only a promotional release and did not chart.

== Track listing ==
1. "Out Of Tears" (Per Aldeheim/Michelle Leonard) - 3:25
2. "Stronger Without You" (AJ Junior/Peter Landin/Kent Larsson) - 3:27
3. "Wasted" (Jörgen Elofsson/Peter Kvint/Helienne Lindvall) - 3:32
4. "Falling Again" (Fredrik Björk/Per Eklund/Tony Malm) - 3:42
5. "Tears In Your Eyes" (Julia Eriksson/Magnus Funemyr/Martin Molin) - 3:55
6. "We Don't Speak" (Staffan Astner/Carol Anne Good/Anders Hansson) - 3:41
7. "Damn You" (Daniel Gibson/Jörgen Ringqvist) - 4:17
8. "Kiss Of Life" (Axel Johansson/Tracy Lipp) - 4:00
9. "Paralyzed" (Björk/Eriksson) - 3:57
10. "One Way Or The Other" (Björk/Eklund) - 3:18
11. "Run" [Bonus Track] (Elofsson/Phil Thornalley/Mathias Venge/Pontus Wennerberg) - 3:56
