= Anna Abreu discography =

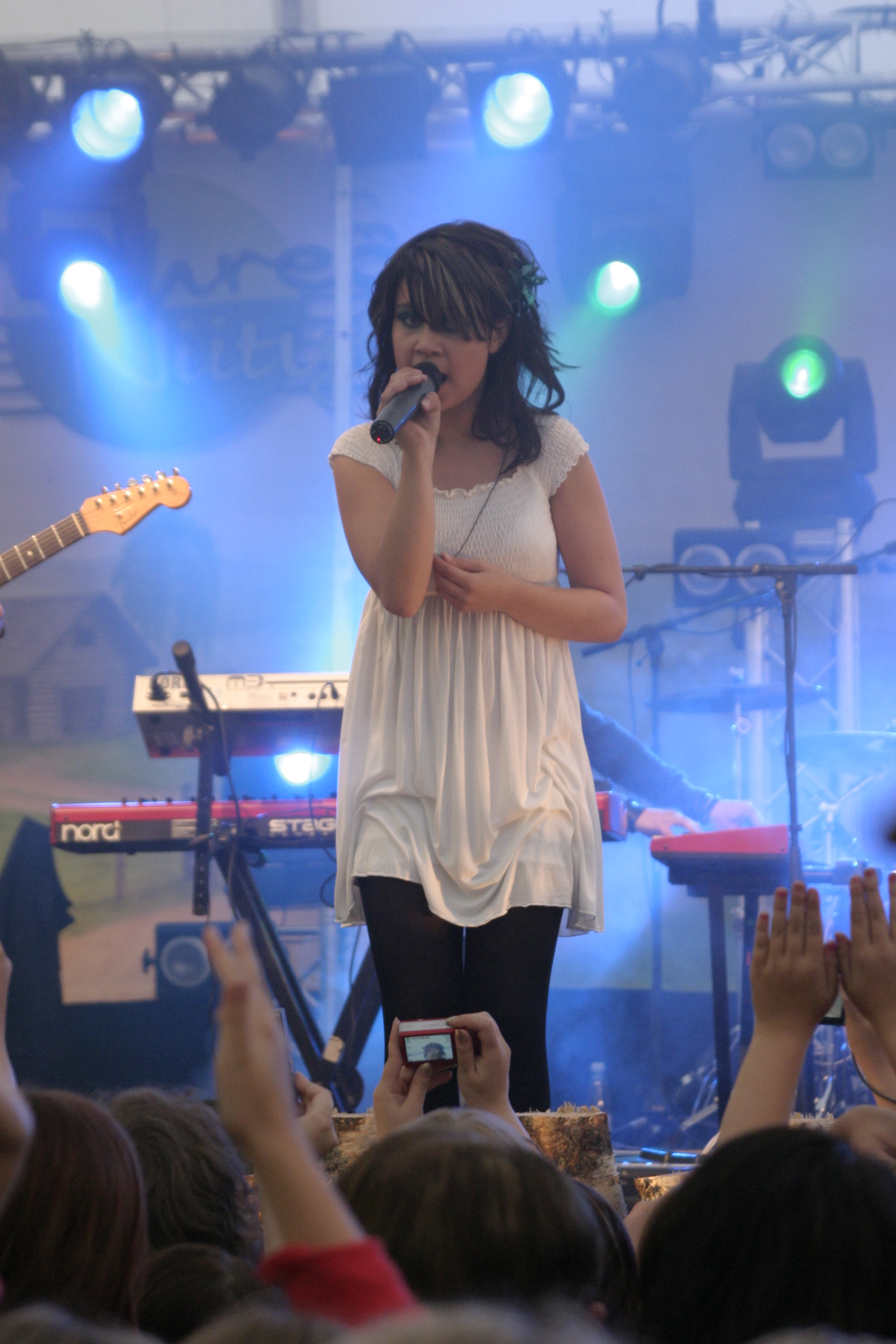
- Studio albums: 8
- Compilation albums: 1
- Singles: 16
- Music videos: 8
- B-sides: 2
- Other Appearances: 6
- Collaborations: 4
- Tours: 8

The discography of Anna Abreu, a Finnish pop, R&B and dance singer, consists of eight studio albums, one compilation album, sixteen singles, two B-sides, and eight music videos on RCA Records and Warner Bros. Records. To date, Abreu has sold over 190,000 certified records in Finland.

== Albums ==
=== Studio albums ===
Title	Album details	Peak	Certifications
Title	Album details	FIN	Certifications
Anna Abreu	Released: 22 August 2007; Label: RCA; Formats: CD, digital download	1	FIN: 2× Platinum
Now	Released: 22 October 2008; Label: RCA; Formats: CD, digital download	1	FIN: Platinum
Just a Pretty Face?	Released: 21 October 2009; Label: RCA; Formats: CD, digital download	2	FIN: Platinum
Rush	Released: 30 March 2011; Label: RCA; Formats: CD, digital download	1	FIN: Gold
V	Released: 30 May 2014; Label: Warner Bros. Records; Formats: CD, LP, digital download	4	FIN: Gold
Sensuroimaton Versio	Released: 9 September 2016; Label: Warner Bros. Records; Formats: CD, digital download	3	FIN: Gold
Teipillä tai rakkaudella	Released: 13 March 2019; Label: Warner Bros. Records; Formats: CD, digital download	2	
Traagista mut maagista	Released: 31 October 2025; Label: Warner Records; Formats: CD, digital download	2	

=== Compilation albums ===
Title	Album details	Peak	Certifications
Title	Album details	FIN	Certifications
Greatest Hits	Released: 22 February 2012; Label: RCA; Formats: CD, digital download	18	FIN: N/A

== Singles ==
Title	Year	Peak			Certifications	Album
Title	Year	FIN: Official	FIN: Digital	FIN: Radio	Certifications	Album
"End of Love"	2007	8	1	—		Anna Abreu
"Ivory Tower"	2007	5	2	1		Anna Abreu
"Are You Ready"	2008	—	17	19		Anna Abreu
"Vinegar"	2008	1	1	1		Now
"Silent Despair"	2008	—	25	2		Now
"Something About U"	2009	—	—	20		Now
"Come Undone"	2009	—	—	—		Now
"Music Everywhere"	2009	2	6	4		Just a Pretty Face?
"Impatient"	2009	—	—	21		Just a Pretty Face?
"Slam"	2010	—	—	—		Just a Pretty Face?
"Hysteria"	2011	6	6	5		Rush
"Worst Part Is Over" (feat. Redrama)	2011	—	24	12		Rush
"Stereo"	2011	—	24	2		Rush
"Be With You"	2011	—	—	—		Rush
"Ra-Ta Ta-Ta"	2014	17	6	4		V
"Right In Front Of You"	2014	—	21	32		V
"Bandana"	2015	5	2	22		Sensuroimaton Versio
"Ayo"	2015	—	6	17		Sensuroimaton Versio
"Grinda Ja Flowaa" (feat. Tippa T)	2016	—	2	55		Sensuroimaton Versio
"Kaikki Mussa Rakastaa Kaikkea Sun"	2016	11	1	32		Sensuroimaton Versio
"Räjäytä Mun Mieli"	2016	13	4	46		Sensuroimaton Versio
"Soo Soo"	2017	—	—	—		Non-album Single
"Jouluyö, juhlayö"	2017	—	—	—		Joulu
"Amor Amor" (feat. Cledos)	2018	9	5	38		Teipillä tai rakkaudella
"Yhen elämän juttu"	2018	1	2	23		Teipillä tai rakkaudella
"Takaisin kotiin"	2019	7	10	78		Teipillä tai rakkaudella
"Se syö naista"	2019	13	7	—		Teipillä tai rakkaudella
"Sytyn"	2019	5	7	12		Teipillä tai rakkaudella
"Teipillä tai rakkaudella"	2019	7	—	3		Teipillä tai rakkaudella
"Lusikat"	2020	5	—	30		Non-album singles
"20 Ave Mariaa"	2021	5	—	9		Non-album singles
"Kaikki Paitsi Sydän"	2022	3	—	21		Non-album singles
"Paholainen (Querido)" (featuring Averagekidluke)	2022	13	—	35		Non-album singles
"Eilisen Mä"	2023	4	—	22		Non-album singles
"Sisko" (& Pihlaja)	2023	4	—	45		Non-album singles
"Sulle tehty"	2023	5	—	21		Non-album singles
"Valheista Kaunein"	2024	10	—	37		Non-album singles
"Caliente"	2024	17	—	64		Non-album singles
"Ihan vähän sua"	2024	14	—	53		Non-album singles
"Äiti Teresa" (featuring Bizi)	2025	1	—	—		Traagista mut maagista
"7 syntiä" (featuring Ahti)	2025	9	—	—		Traagista mut maagista
"Kuka nauraa nyt"	2026	19	—	—		Non-album single

== Other appearances ==
Title	Year	Peak			Certifications	Album
Title	Year	FIN: Official	FIN: Digital	FIN: Radio	Certifications	Album
"Broken"	2007	—	11	—		Idols 2007
"Work It Out"	2008	—	27	—		Now (Bonus track)
"Rush"	2009	—	—	—		Records Are Forever
"Kylmästä Lämpimään"	2013	3	1	6		Vain elämää 2
"Poplaulajan Vapaapäivä"	2013	17	29	—		Vain elämää 2
"Huominen on Huomenna" (JVG feat. Anna Abreu)	2014	1	1	1		Voitolla Yöhön
"Voodoo" (Roope Salminen & Koirat feat. Anna Abreu)	2016	6	4	36		Madafakin levy
"Klassikoita" (Bang for the Buck feat. Anna Abreu & (JVG)	2016	16	7	56		
"Uuden edessä" (Toivon kärki)	2020	2	—	2		
"Huuliharppu (Antonio)"	2021	3	—	35		Vain elämää 12
"Levoton Tyttö" (Abreu feat. Evelina, Nelli Matula)	2021	4	—	3		Vain elämää 12
"Laulu Ilman Sanoja" (Gasellit feat. Abreu)	2022	4	—	6		
"Mä ja sä" (Jore & Zpoppa feat. Abreu)	2025	31	—	—		
"Sry Honey" (feat. Senya)	2025	47	—	—		Traagista mut maagista

== Music videos ==
Song	Year	Director
"End of Love"	2007	Kusti Manninen
"Ivory Tower"	2007	Kusti Manninen
"Vinegar"	2008	Kusti Manninen
"Silent Despair"	2008	Misko Iho
"Music Everywhere"	2009	Mikko Harma
"Impatient"	2009	Mikko Harma
"Hysteria"	2011	Mikko Harma
"Stereo"	2011	Jaakko Itäaho
"Ra-Ta Ta-Ta"	2014	Hannu Aukia
"Right in Front of You"	2014	Taito Kawata
"Bandana"	2015	Joonas Kenttämies
