= Greatest Hits (Anna Abreu album) =

Compilation album by Anna Abreu
- Released: 22 February 2012
- Recorded: 2007–2010
- Genre: Pop, R&B, dance
- Language: English, Portuguese
- Label: RCA
- Producer: Rauli 'Rake' Eskolin, Teema Brunila, Jukka Immonen, Jussi Nikula, Patric Sarin,

Anna Abreu chronology
Rush (2011)	Greatest Hits (2012)	V (2014)

Greatest Hits is the first compilation album by Finnish singer-songwriter Anna Abreu, released in Finland by RCA on February 22, 2012. The album contains all of the singles released from Abreu's four previous studio albums (Anna Abreu, Now, Just a Pretty Face? and Rush) along with several album tracks that were favourites of Abreu's. The album was released in two formats: a CD only version containing eighteen tracks, or a 2-disc CD/DVD version which also includes Abreu's eight music videos and a documentary. The album would be Abreu's final release under her recording contract with RCA, as she moved to Warner Bros. Records later in 2012.

== Commercial performance ==
Greatest Hits debuted and peaked at number eighteen on the Finnish Top 50 Albums Chart, Abreu's lowest chart position to date. To date it has sold around 5,000 copies.

=== Chart performance ===
Chart	Peak position	Sales
Finnish Albums Chart	18	5,000

== Track listing ==
No.	Title	Writer(s)	Producer(s)	Length
1.	"End of Love (from Anna Abreu)"	Teema Brunila	Rauli Eskolin, Teema Brunila	03:42
2.	"Vinegar (from Now)"	Patric Sarin, Rauli Eskolin	Rauli Eskolin	3:41
3.	"Music Everywhere (from Just a Pretty Face?)"	Sarin, Eskolin, Eva Peijakas	Rauli Eskolin	3:16
4.	"Stereo (from Rush)"	Bryn Christopher, Jukka Immonen, Ali Tennant	Jukka Immonen	4:05
5.	"Hysteria (from Rush)"	Sarin	Jukka Immonen	4:07
6.	"Ivory Tower (from Anna Abreu)"	Eskolin	Rauli Eskolin	3:46
7.	"Impatient (from Just a Pretty Face?)"	Eskolin, Sarin, Anna Abreu	Rauli Eskolin	3:45
8.	"Worst Part Is Over feat. Redrama (from Rush)"	Redrama, Abreu, Immonen	Jukka Immonen	3:38
9.	"Silent Despair (from Now)"	Sarin, Eskolin, Abreu	Rauli Eskolin	3:57
10.	"Be With You (from Rush)"	Jussi Nikula, Erik Nyholm, Antti Riihimaki	Jukka Immonen, Jussi Nikula	3:31
11.	"Slam (from Just a Pretty Face?)"	Steve Lee, Sarin	Rauli Eskolin, Patric Sarin	3:00
12.	"Are You Ready (from Anna Abreu)"	Ruth-Anne Cunningham, Daniel John O'Donoghue	Rauli Eskolin	3:13
13.	"2nd Chance (from Just a Pretty Face?)"	David Astrom, Patrik Berggren, Jonas Myrin	Rauli Eskolin	3:23
14.	"Something About U (from Now)"	Mats Valentin, Johan 'Jones' Wetterberg, Per Eklund	Rauli Eskolin	3:56
15.	"Come Undone (from Now)"	Eskolin	Rauli Eskolin	4:01
16.	"Do Avesso (from Just a Pretty Face?)"	Abreu, Marina Alberto	Rauli Eskolin	4:13
17.	"Everywhere I Go (from Anna Abreu)"	Nathan Brent Bennett, Steven Stewart	Rauli Eskolin	3:17
18.	"Stereo (RunAgo 2012 Remix)"	Christopher, Immonen, Tennant	Jukka Immonen	5:36

== Promotion ==
Over and Out Tour
- Tour by Anna Abreu
- Associated album: Greatest Hits
- Start date: February 20, 2012
- End date: April 27, 2012
- Legs: 1
- No. of shows: 4 in Finland

Anna Abreu concert chronology
- Rush Tour (2011); Over and Out Tour (2012); V Tour (2014)

In 2012, Abreu promoted her greatest hits album with the Over and Out Tour throughout Finland. Her Walking On Water Two show, which was a one-off held aboard the M/S Silja Europa in Turku was also used to promote the album.

=== Setlist ===
Finland - Over and Out
1. "End of Love"
2. "Solta-se O Beijo"
3. "Shame"
4. "Ivory Tower"
5. "Everywhere I Go"
6. "Work It Out"
7. "Vinegar"
8. "Junkie For Your Love"
9. "Come Undone"
10. "Mr. Perfect"
11. "7 Days, 7 Nights"
12. "Slam" (performed at selected venues)
13. "Capital C" (performed at selected venues)
14. "2nd Chance"
15. "Music Everywhere"
16. "Worst Part Is Over"
17. "Stereo"
18. "Hysteria"
Finland - Walking On Water Two
1. "Vinegar"
2. "Be With You"
3. "Hysteria"
4. "Mr. Perfect"
5. "Other Side"
6. "End of Love"
7. "Ivory Tower"
8. "Shame"
9. "Walking On Water"
10. "Worst Part Is Over"
11. "Capital C"
12. "Work It Out"
13. "Stereo"
14. "Slam"
15. "Music Everywhere"
16. "Come Undone"
17. "Contigo Corazon"
18. "No Estragues El Momento"

=== Tour dates ===
Date	City	Country	Venue
February 20, 2012	Turku	Finland	M/S Silja Europa
April 11, 2012	Vantaa	Finland	Konserttitalo Martinus
April 19, 2012	Pieksämäki	Finland	Poleeni
April 27, 2012	Helsinki	Finland	The Circus
