= Hysteria (Anna Abreu song) =

Single by Anna Abreu

from the album Rush
- Released: 10 January 2011
- Recorded: 2010
- Genre: Pop, Dance, Synthpop
- Length: 4:07
- Label: RCA
- Songwriter(s): Patric Sarin
- Producer(s): Jukka Immonen

Anna Abreu singles chronology
"Slam" (2010)	"Hysteria" (2011)	"Worst Part Is Over" (2011)

Music video
- "Hysteria" on YouTube

"Hysteria" is a song by Finnish singer Anna Abreu from her fourth studio album, Rush (2011). Patric Sarin, who had previously worked with Abreu on her former two albums, wrote the song. It was produced by Jukka Immonen, the hitmaker responsible for producing all three of Finnish singer Jenni Vartiainen's albums, including Seili, which was certified 7xPlatinum and went on to become one of the highest-selling albums of all time in Finland. "Hysteria" is a Pop song that continues the Dance infusion Abreu started using during the Now era. It also contains elements of Synthpop. The song was released on 10 January 2011 in Finland, as the album's lead single.

== Lyrical content ==
"Hysteria" is an up-tempo dance anthem with clear elements of synthpop. Lyrically, the song deals with the idea of letting go of worries and living in the moment with someone you are romantically involved with, even if doing so feels like 'hysteria'. Abreu encourages people in such a situation to 'start breaking some rules' and challenges with the rhetorical question 'what's life without a sin?'

== Chart performance ==
"Hysteria" debuted and peaked at number six on the Finnish Top 20 Singles Chart, a position it held for two non-consecutive weeks. The song also reached number six on the Download Chart and number five on the Radio Airplay Chart.

Chart (2011)	Peak position
Finland (Top 20 Singles)	6
Finland (Digital)	6
Finland (Radio)	5

== Music video ==
The music video for "Hysteria" was directed by Mikko Harman, who had previously directed the videos for "Music Everywhere" and "Impatient" from Abreu's third album Just a Pretty Face?. The video was shot in an Ovako factory in the town of Imatra. The video begins with Abreu, wearing a worker's boiler suit, working in the factory alongside a love interest. Throughout the video, we see another version of Abreu, wearing a long dress (and seems to represent the 'sin' of the lyrics), dancing in the factory and seducing the male co-worker. At the end, just as she is about to kiss him, Abreu pushes him away and runs out of the factory and into the arms of another man, who is silhouetted in the doorway.

== Live performances ==
"Hysteria" has become one of Abreu's signature songs, and is her sixth most-performed song when on tour.

== Cover versions ==
- Finnish rock band Sturm und Drang recorded a version of the song for the Japanese release of their 2012 album, Graduation Day.

== Track listing ==
1. "Hysteria" – 4:07

== Credits and personnel ==
- Songwriting – Patric Sarin
- Production - Jukka Immonen
- Engineering - Jukka Immonen (at Fried Music Studios: Helsinki, Finland)
- Instruments - Jukka Immonen, Mikko Pietinen (drums)
- Lead vocals - Anna Abreu
- Backing vocals - Anna Abreu
- Mixing - Jukka Immonen, Arttu Peljo

== Release history ==
Region	Date	Format	Label
Finland	10 January 2011	CD single, Digital download	RCA
