= Deadly Awards 2002 =

The Deadlys Awards were an annual celebration of Australian Aboriginal and Torres Strait Islander achievement in music, sport, entertainment and community.

== Music ==
- Outstanding Contribution to Aboriginal Music: Candy Williams
- Music Video of the Year: Shakaya: "Sublime"
- Most Promising New Talent: Shakaya
- Country Artist of the Year: Jimmy Little
- Male Artist of the Year: Archie Roach
- Female Artist of the Year: Toni Janke
- Album Release of the Year: Archie Roach: Sensual Being
- Single Release of the Year: Shakaya: "Stop Calling Me"
- Band of the Year: Shakaya

== Sport ==
- Female Sportsperson of the Year: Bo De La Cruz
- Male Sportsperson of the Year: David Peachey
- Most Promising New Talent in Sport: Jade North
- Excellence in Football: Andrew McLeod

== The arts ==
- Female Actor of the Year: Everlyn Sampi
- Male Actor of the Year: David Gulpilil
- Excellence in Entertainment: Mary G
- Excellence in Film or Theatrical Score: David Page and Steve Francis: Skin by Bangarra Dance Theatre

== Community ==
- Aboriginal Broadcaster of the Year: 4K1G
