= Ra-Ta Ta-Ta (Anna Abreu song) =

Single by Anna Abreu

from the album V
- Released: 1 April 2014
- Recorded: 2014
- Genre: Pop, Dance
- Length: 3:08
- Label: Warner Bros. Records
- Songwriter(s): Jonas Karlsson, Hank Solo, Anna Abreu
- Producer(s): Jonas Karlsson, Hank Solo

Anna Abreu singles chronology
"Be With You" (2011)	"Ra-Ta Ta-Ta" (2014)	"Right in Front of You" (2014)

Music video
- "Ra-Ta Ta-Ta" on YouTube

"Ra-Ta Ta-Ta" is a song by Finnish singer Anna Abreu from her fifth studio album, V (2014). Abreu co-wrote the song with Jonas Karlsson and Hank Solo, who also produced the track. "Ra-Ta Ta-Ta" is a Pop song with the Dance elements that Abreu has become famous for since the Now era of 2008. The song served as the album's lead single and was made available in Finland on April 1, 2014. It marked Abreu's first release under her new recording contract with Warner Bros. Records, and her first release since returning from hiatus after promotion for her Greatest Hits compilation album ended in early 2012.

== Lyrical content ==
'Ra-Ta Ta-Ta' is a dance-pop song that deals with the 'comeback haters' who doubted the success of Abreu's return to music following her departure from RCA Records in 2012. Abreu refers to her return to music as her 'update 2.0' and states that she and her fans 'just wanna have a good time', while the bridge refers to 'music fill[ing] the air' before going into the rapid-fire 'ra-ta ta-ta' chorus.

== Chart performance ==
"Ra-Ta Ta-Ta" debuted and peaked at number seventeen on the Finnish Top 20 Singles Chart, becoming her first lead single to miss the top ten. However, the song matched the success of her two previous lead singles on the Download Chart and Radio Airplay Chart, where it peaked at numbers six and four, respectively.

Chart (2014)	Peak position
Finland (Top 20 Singles)	17
Finland (Digital)	6
Finland (Radio)	4

== Music video ==
The music video for "Ra-Ta Ta-Ta" was directed by Hannu Aukia. The video was shot in a range of locations in and around Helsinki including a disused underground car park and an empty roller-rink. In it, Abreu is seen wearing a black leotard and leather jacket, dancing with her backing dancers in a range of locations. There are also several scenes where Abreu stands singing in a darkened room while covered in silver glitter. This video attracted attention for its similarity to videos by American singer Miley Cyrus, namely "Wrecking Ball". In both videos, the two females are seen smashing objects with a sledgehammer and Abreu also performs Cyrus' signature 'twerk' during the "Ra-Ta Ta-Ta" video. The video has by far become Abreu's most-watched on YouTube, having been viewed over a million times.

== Live performances ==
Abreu performed "Ra-Ta Ta-Ta" live at the Hartwall Arena during the break at the 2014 Kanada-malja, in front of a crowd of 13,000 people. The song was also performed at a range of music festivals across Finland during the summer of 2014, and as part of Abreu's 2014 V Tour.

== Credits and personnel ==
- Songwriting – Jonas Karlsson, Hank Solo, Anna Abreu
- Production - Jonas Karlsson, Hank Solo
- Engineering - Jonas Karlsson, Hank Solo (at Fried Music Studios: Helsinki, Finland)
- Instruments - Jonas Karlsson, Hank Solo
- Lead vocals - Anna Abreu
- Backing vocals - Anna Abreu
- Mixing - Arttu Peljo

== Release history ==
Region	Date	Format	Label
Finland	1 April 2014	CD single, Digital download	Warner Bros. Records
