= Vinegar (song) =

Single by Anna Abreu

from the album Now
- Released: 6 August 2008
- Recorded: 2008
- Genre: Pop, Dance
- Length: 3:41
- Label: RCA
- Songwriters: Patric Sarin, Rauli Eskolin
- Producer: Rauli Eskolin

Anna Abreu singles chronology
"Are You Ready" (2008)	"Vinegar" (2008)	"Silent Despair" (2008)

Music video
- "Vinegar" on YouTube

"Vinegar" is a song by Finnish singer Anna Abreu from her second studio album, Now (2008). Rauli Eskolin (known professionally as Rake) co-wrote the song with Patric Sarin. Eskolin, who has previously worked on Abreu's debut album Anna Abreu, also produced the song. "Vinegar" is a Pop song but also marked a clear change in musical direction for Abreu, with heavy Dance elements. The song was released on 6 August 2008 in Finland, as the album's lead single. It was also released in the United Kingdom in November 2009 as Abreu's first release outside Finland.

== Lyrical content ==
Lyrically, "Vinegar" examines a negative and possibly destructive relationship. Abreu uses a range of metaphors to describe how her partner has had a bad effect upon her, describing herself as things that have positive connotations while describing him as things that have negative connotations: smile/tears, connect/block, cream/lemon (sour), symphony/dischord, and finally 'vinegar in my dreams'. However, the theme of empowerment is clear in the song's lyrics, with Abreu singing that the boy is 'history' and that there'll be 'no more tears and no more hearts to break'.

== Chart performance ==
"Vinegar" debuted at number five on the Finnish Top 20 Singles Chart, before rising to the number one spot two weeks later, becoming Abreu's first number one on the official singles chart. It remained at the top for three non-consecutive weeks and spent a total of nineteen weeks, becoming the eighty-eighth best-selling single of all time in Finland and Abreu's most successful single to date. The song also reached number one on the Finnish Download Chart, as well as number one on the Radio Airplay Chart. In the UK, the song hit number seven on the Official Dance Chart. To date, Abreu continues to have the highest placing on the chart for a Finnish female artist.

Chart (2008)	Peak position
Finland (Top 20 Singles)	1
Finland (Digital)	1
Finland (Radio)	1

== Music video ==
The music video for "Vinegar" was directed by Jaakko Manninen, who had previously directed the videos for Abreu's singles "End of Love" and "Ivory Tower". The video begins with Abreu and male backing dancers in a dark room; close ups show Abreu singing the first verse of the song. When the chorus begins, Abreu is seen dancing in a white room with mirrored walls. Metallic blue and silver balloons then begin falling from the ceiling. The video then cuts between the two locations; topless male dancers join Abreu in the mirrored room. One of the male dancers from the music video (Ragnar Orav) would go on to appear in the 2009 series of Big Brother.

== Live performances ==
Abreu performed the song at the 2009 Emma Awards, during which she was nominated for five awards, including Song of the Year for "Vinegar". It has since become Abreu's signature song and her most popular song to be performed live. To date, it is her most-performed song when she is on tour, having been performed at almost every show during all of her tours since the Now Tour (2008–2009).

== Track listing ==
1. "Vinegar" – 3:41

== Credits and personnel ==
- Songwriting – Patric Sarin, Rauli Eskolin
- Production - Rauli Eskolin
- Engineering - Rauli Eskolin (at Inkfish Studios: Helsinki, Finland)
- Instruments - Rauli Eskolin
- Lead vocals - Anna Abreu
- Backing vocals - Anna Abreu
- Mixing - Rauli Eskolin

== Release history ==
Region	Date	Format	Label
Finland	6 August 2008	CD single, Digital download	RCA
