= Simone Stacey =

Australian singer-songwriter

- Born: Simone Angela Stacey; November 1977 (age 48–49); Cairns, Queensland, Australia
- Genres: Pop, R&B, soul, jazz
- Occupations: Singer-songwriter, label owner, child safety worker
- Instrument: Vocals
- Years active: 2002–2006, 2011–present
- Label: Diamond Dove/Malosi Entertainment

Simone Angela Stacey (born November 1977) is an Australian soul and jazz singer-songwriter. She was a founding mainstay member of girl pop duo, Shakaya, along with Naomi Wenitong, from 2002 to 2006. Soon after, Wenitong formed a hip-hop group, The Last Kinection, while Stacey took a hiatus from the music industry. In October 2011 Stacey was featured on The Last Kinection's single, "Are We There Yet?". In April 2013, she auditioned for Season 2 of The Voice and was eliminated in "Episode 12: The Battles". At the Deadly Awards 2013, Stacey was nominated for Single Release of the Year for "My Pledge" (May 2013), and for Female Artist of the Year.

== Biography ==
Simone Angela Stacey was born in late November 1977. Graduated from Bowen State High School, Bowen, Queensland, in 1994 before moving to Cairns, Queensland. In 1999, she attended TAFE North: Cairns campus, studying an ATSIC-sponsored music course. Her first job was working in a deli.

=== 2001–06: Shakaya ===
In August 2001, Simone Stacey performed at a showcase at Sony Music Entertainment in Sydney, after which she signed with Sony along with fellow singer-songwriter, Naomi Wenitong. The pair had met while studying at TAFE North. They formed a pop duo, Shakaya.

Shakaya's debut single "Stop Calling Me" was released in January 2002, it was co-written by Stacey, Wenitong and Reno Nicastro, their manager and producer. The lyrics are based on the life experiences of Stacey, Wenitong and their friends. It is the duo's highest charting single, reaching No. 5 on the ARIA Singles Chart.

The group's debut self-titled album, released 5 October 2002, peaked at No. 5 on the ARIA Albums Chart. Their second album, Are You Ready, released 5 March 2006, did not chart.

Shakaya disbanded in 2006 when Wenitong formed a hip-hop group, The Last Kinection, with her brother Joel Wenitong and Jacob Turier, in Newcastle. From 2006 to 2011, Stacey took a hiatus from the music industry and "worked a range of jobs, most recently helping people living with disabilities, but she never stopped thinking about music and continued to write songs in her spare time."

=== 2011 to present: Return ===
By October 2011, Stacey had resumed her music career and was featured on "Are We There Yet?", a single by The Last Kinection. In April 2013, she auditioned for Season 2 of The Voice. She chose Seal as her coach. Her blind audition was a cover version of Nat King Cole's "For Sentimental Reasons". Stacey was eliminated in a Battle Round against Michelle Martinez.

In May 2013, she released her single, "My Pledge", on her own label, Diamond Dove. The lyrics deal with the blackbirding of her great grandfather and about honouring and respecting one's elders. At the Deadly Awards 2013, Stacey was nominated for Single Release of the Year for "My Pledge", and for Female Artist of the Year.

In April 2015, Stacey and Wenitong collaborated for a charity single providing cover versions of "Black Roses" (originally by Inner Circle) and "Long as I Can See the Light" (Creedence Clearwater Revival). Proceeds were donated to community members affected by the Cairns child killings of the previous December. As from January 2015 Stacey was as a child safety worker in Cairns.

Stacey wrote the music for the Australian short film, On Stage, which is due to premiere at the Sydney Film Festival on 10 June 2015.

== Discography ==
=== Singles ===
Year	Title
2011	"Are We There Yet?" (The Last Kinection featuring Simone Stacey)
2013	"My Pledge"
2013	"For Sentimental Reasons"
2015	"Black Roses" / "Long as I Can See the Light" (Naomi Wenitong featuring Simone Stacey)
