= Deadly Awards 2010 =

The 2010 Deadly Awards were hosted by Luke Carroll and Naomi Wenitong (of The Last Kinection) at the Sydney Opera House on 27 September 2010. Performers included Archie Roach, Dan Sultan, Christine Anu, Frank Yamma, Ali Mills and the Bangarra Dance Theatre. The Awards program will be broadcast on SBS and SBS Two on 3 and 6 October respectively. The awards event was an annual celebration of Australian Aboriginal and Torres Strait Islander achievement in music, sport, entertainment and community.

== Music ==
- Single Release of the Year: Dan Sultan - "Letter"
- Album Release of the Year: Archie Roach - 1988
- Male Artist of the Year: Dan Sultan
- Female Artist of the Year: Naomi Wenitong
- Outstanding Achievement in RNB and Hip Hop: The Last Kinection
- Band of the Year: The Medics
- Most Promising New Talent in Music: Busby Marou

== Sport ==
- Sportsman of the Year: Timana Tahu, NRL
- Sportswoman of the Year: Josie Janz, netball
- Outstanding Achievement in AFL: Nathan Lovett-Murray
- Outstanding Achievement in NRL: Jamal Idris

== The arts ==
- Film of the Year: Bran Nue Dae
- Live Production of the Year: The Sapphires
- Male Actor of the Year: Rocky McKenzie
- Female Actor of the Year: Deborah Mailman
- Outstanding Achievement in Literature: Anita Heiss for Manhattan Dreaming
- Dancer of the Year: Yolande Brown
- Visual Artist of the Year: Walangari Karntawarra
- Outstanding Achievement in TV: Message Stick - ABC
- Television Personality of the Year: Wendell Sailor (The NRL Footy Show)

== Community ==
- Outstanding Achievement in Aboriginal and Torres Strait Islander Health: Dr Peter O'Mara, Australian Indigenous Doctors' Association.
- Indigenous Health Worker of the Year: Colleen Carwood, Prince of Wales Hospital, NSW.
- Outstanding Achievement in Aboriginal and Torres Strait Islander Employment: Swim For Life Program, YMCA Perth.
- Outstanding Achievement in Cultural Advancement: Shane Phillips.
- Community Broadcaster of the Year: Glen Crump, Mission Beat Moree.
- Leader of the Year: Patricia Turner, NITV.
- Outstanding Achievement in Aboriginal and Torres Strait Islander Education: St Teresa's Agricultural College, Abergowrie, Qld
