= Right in Front of You =

Right in Front of You may refer to:

- "Right in Front of You", a 2002 song by Celine Dion from A New Day Has Come
- "Right in Front of You" (Anna Abreu song), a 2014 song by Anna Abreu from V
