= Sublime (song) =

2002 single by Shakaya

Single by Shakaya

from the album Shakaya
- Released: 20 May 2002
- Length: 3:19
- Label: Columbia
- Songwriter(s): Reno Nicastro; Simone Stacey; Naomi Wenitong
- Producer(s): Reno Nicastro

Shakaya singles chronology
"Stop Calling Me" (2002)	"Sublime" (2002)	"Cinderella" (2002)

Audio video
- "Sublime" on YouTube

"Sublime" is the second song released by Australian musical duo Shakaya from their self-titled debut album (2002). It reached number 19 on the Australian Singles Chart.

== Track listings ==
- Original single
1. "Sublime"
2. "Sublime" (House mix)
3. "Sublime" (Sam Gee Clubb mix)
4. "Sublime" (Smoooth mix)
5. "Stop Calling Me" (Grooove mix)
- "Sublime" / "Stop Calling Me"
1. "Sublime"
2. "Stop Calling Me"
3. "Stop Calling Me" (House mix, Mobin Master & Dj Hess)
4. "Stop Calling Me" (Nurban mix, New Breed)
5. "Stop Calling Me" (Gomez mix)

== Charts ==
Chart (2002)	Peak position
Australia (ARIA)	19
