= Sensuroimaton Versio =

Studio album by Anna Abreu
- Released: September 9, 2016
- Recorded: 2015–2016
- Genre: Pop, dance
- Length: 32:14
- Label: Warner Bros.

Anna Abreu chronology
V (2014)	Sensuroimaton Versio (2016)

Singles from Sensuroimaton Versio
- 1. "Bandana" Released: June 5, 2015; 2. "Ayo" Released: September 18, 2015; 3. "Grindaa ja flowaa" Released: February 17, 2016; 4. "Kaikki mussa rakastaa kaikkea sun" Released: April 14, 2016; 5. "Räjäytä mun mieli" Released: July 1, 2016

Sensuroimaton Versio is the sixth studio album by Finnish singer Anna Abreu, released in Finland by Warner Bros. Records on September 9, 2016. The album was preceded by five singles and marked Abreu's first Finnish-language studio album, following her fifth English-language album V.

The album debuted and peaked at number 3 on the Finnish Albums Chart, becoming Abreu's sixth consecutive Top 5 album and her highest entry since her 2011 album Rush.

== Commercial performance ==
Sensuroimaton Versio debuted and peaked at number three on the Finnish Top 50 Albums Chart. To date it has sold over 10,000 copies and been certified gold by the IFPI.

Chart	Peak position	Certification	Sales
Finnish Albums Chart	3	Gold	10,000

== Track listing ==
No.	Title	Writer(s)	Length
1.	"Räjäytä Mun Mieli"	Patric Sarin, Kalle Lindroth, Mikke Vepsäläinen, Anna Abreu	3:25
2.	"Bandana"	Thomas Kirjonen, Axel Ehnström, Jonas W. Karlsson, Abreu	2:44
3.	"Sensuroimaton Versio"	Karlsson, Kyösti Salokorpi, Abreu	3:01
4.	"Kaikki Paljaana (feat. Mikael Gabriel)"	Hank Solo, Eetu Kalavainen, Abreu, Mikael Gabriel	3:18
5.	"Kaikki Mussa Rakastaa Kaikkea Sun"	Karlsson, Kirjonen, Lasse Kurki, Maija Vilkkumaa, Abreu	3:46
6.	"Au Naturel"	Karlsson, Lindroth, Kurki, Iisa Pykäri	2:51
7.	"Grindaa Ja Flowaa (feat. Tippa-T)"	Joonas Angeria, Jarkko Ehnqvist, VilleGalle, Tippa-T	3:41
8.	"Et Jätä Mua Yksin"	Karlsson, Hank Solo, Kurki, Elias Kaskinen	3:20
9.	"Isä"	Pykäri, Väinö Wallenius	2:46
10.	"Ayo"	Ehnström, Vepsäläinen	3:34
Total length:			32:14

== Promotion ==
Sensuroimaton Versio Tour
- Tour by Anna Abreu
- Associated album: Sensuroimaton Versio
- Start date: October 1, 2016
- End date: December 10, 2016
- Legs: 1
- No. of shows: 19 in Finland

Anna Abreu concert chronology
- V Tour (2014); Sensuroimaton Versio Tour (2016); TBA

In late 2016, Abreu promoted her sixth album with the Sensuroimaton Versio Tour throughout Finland.

=== Tour dates ===
Date	City	Country	Venue
October 1, 2016	Pori	Finland	Isomaen Areena
October 7, 2016	Eckero Line	Finland	M/S Finlandia
October 12, 2016	Tallink	Finland	M/S Baltic Princess
October 13, 2016	Tallink	Finland	M/S Baltic Princess
October 14, 2016	Turku	Finland	Venus Nightlife
October 15, 2016	Viking Line	Finland	Grace
October 16, 2016	Viking Line	Finland	Grace
October 17, 2016	Viking Line	Finland	Mariella
October 18, 2016	Viking Line	Finland	Mariella
October 19, 2016	Tallink	Finland	Baltic Queen
October 20, 2016	Tallink	Finland	Baltic Queen
October 28, 2016	Inari	Finland	Papana Bar
November 11, 2016	Levi	Finland	Hulluporo Areena
November 12, 2016	Helsinki	Finland	Tavastia
November 19, 2016	Saarijarvi	Finland	Summassaari
November 25, 2016	Joensuu	Finland	Sokos Hotel Kimmel
November 26, 2016	Kuopio	Finland	Puijonsarvi
December 9, 2016	Helsinki	Finland	DTM
December 10, 2016	Kaustinen	Finland	Viihderavintola Konsta
