= Are You Ready (Shakaya album) =

Studio album by Shakaya
- Released: 5 March 2006
- Recorded: 2005
- Studio: Cairns, Australia
- Genre: Pop, R&B
- Length: 38:37
- Label: Columbia
- Producer: Billy Mann, Christopher Rojas

Shakaya chronology
| Shakaya (2002) | Are You Ready (2006) |

Singles from Are You Ready
- 1. "Are You Ready" Released: 10 June 2005; 2. "We Ain't Goin' Down" Released: 13 November 2005

Are You Ready is the second and the final album by Australian girl duo Shakaya, released on 5 March 2006 by Columbia Records. It was produced by Billy Mann and Christopher Rojas and features urban R&B songs—written by Shakaya themselves and Audius Mtawarira, Daniel O'Donoghue, Ruth-Anne Cunningham and Jonathan Davis. Sales of the album in Australia did not match those of their first album Shakaya (2002), and the singles "Are You Ready" and "We Ain't Goin' Down" were not major hits. It is the final album from the group, as they disbanded later in the year due to Naomi Wenitong joining the hip-hop group The Last Kinection in 2006.

== Track listing ==
1. "Are You Ready" (Daniel O'Donoghue, Ruth-Anne Cunningham) – 3:23
2. "No Shame" (Wenitong, Stacey, Rob Fusari, Falonte Moore, Aleese Simmons, Andre Morton) – 3:20
3. "Broken" (Wenitong, Stacey, Alex Greggs, O'Donoghue, Mark Sheehan) – 3:38
4. "We Ain't Goin' Down" (Nigel Butler, Ray Hedges, Tracy Ackerman, Abdul Nello) – 3:18
5. "Too Late" (Wenitong, Stacey, Audius Mtawarira) – 3:55
6. "Tryna Find Tha One" (Wenitong, Stacey, Mtawarira) – 3:29
7. "Love Story" (Wenitong, Stacey, Billymann, Chris Rojas) – 3:26
8. "I Do Better" (Wenitong, Stacey, Greggs, O'Donoghue, Sheehan) – 2:54
9. "It's Alright" (Wenitong, Stacey, Jonathan Davis, Calvin Gaines) – 3:17
10. "Motor" (Wenitong, Stacey, Greggs, O'Donoghue, Sheehan) – 3:36
11. "Something's Gotta Give" (Greggs, O'Donoghue, Sheehan) – 4:15
