= Cinderella (Shakaya song) =

2002 single by Shakaya

Single by Shakaya

from the album Shakaya
- B-side: "Good Times"; "What I Want"
- Released: 30 September 2002
- Recorded: Megatrax (Cairns, Queensland)
- Length: 3:33
- Label: Columbia
- Songwriters: Vincent DeGiorgio; Rebecca Hortlund; Mikael Lundh; George Samuelson; Quint Starkie
- Producers: Patrick Crowley; Reno Nicastro; Khesrow Rasta

Shakaya singles chronology
"Sublime" (2002)	"Cinderella" (2002)	"The Way You Make Me Feel" (2003)

Audio video
- "Cinderella" on YouTube

"Cinderella" is a song performed by Australian recording duo Shakaya for their debut album Shakaya (2002). The song was released as the album's third and final single on 30 September 2002. It was written by Vincent DeGiorgio, Rebecca Hortlund, Mikael Lundh, George Samuelson and Quint Starkie and produced by Patrick Crowley, Reno Nicastro and Khesrow Rasta.

== Track listing ==
CD single

1. "Cinderella" (Radio Edit) – 3:33
2. "Cinderella" (Vocal Remix) – 3:40
3. "Cinderella" (NRG Mix) – 5:57
4. "Sublime" (Hess Bamboo Mix) – 7:38
5. "What I Want" – 3:33
6. "Good Times" – 3:44

== Charts ==
Weekly chart performance for "Cinderella"
Chart (2002)	Peak position
Australia (ARIA)	16
Australian Urban (ARIA)	5

== Certifications ==
Certifications and sales for "Cinderella"
Region	Certification	Certified units/sales
Australia (ARIA)	Gold	35,000^{^}
^{^} Shipments figures based on certification alone.

== Release history ==
Release dates and formats for "Cinderella"
Region	Date	Format	Label	Catalog	Ref
Australia	30 September 2002	CD	Columbia	SMA673126.2	
