= Local Knowledge (band) =

Indigenous Australian hip-hop group

- Origin: Newcastle, New South Wales, Australia
- Genre: Hip-hop
- Years active: 2002–2006
- Past members: Joel Wenitong; Abie Wright; Jacob Turier; Warrick Wright

Local Knowledge were an Indigenous hip-hop group from Newcastle, New South Wales. They were formed in 2002 by brothers Abie and Wok Wright and Joel Wenitong with DJ Jay Tee joining later. They disbanded in 2006. After the breakup Joel, his sister Naomi from Shakaya and DJ Jay Tee formed The Last Kinection while Abie and Wok have formed Street Warriors.

Local Knowledge won a Deadly Award in 2005 for Band of the Year and a Musicoz award for Indigenous Band of the Year. They played a live set for TripleJ's Live at the Wireless show, becoming the first indigenous hip hop group to do so and were the subjects of a SBS TV documentary "Local Knowledge: The Message". Their song Blackfellas was on high rotation on TripleJ.

== Discography ==
- Blackfellas ep (2005)
