= Shakaya (album) =

2002 album by Shakaya

Studio album by Shakaya
- Released: 21 October 2002
- Studio: Megatrax (Cairns, Queensland)
- Length: 40:43
- Label: Columbia
- Producer: Reno Nicastro

Shakaya chronology
Shakaya (2002)	Are You Ready (2006)

Singles from Shakaya
- 1. "Stop Calling Me" Released: 21 January 2002; 2. "Sublime" Released: 20 May 2002; 3. "Cinderella" Released: 30 September 2002

Shakaya is the first studio album by the Australian duo of the same name, which was released in Australia on 21 October 2002 by Columbia Records. It was mostly co-written by the duo, Simone Stacey and Naomi Wenitong, with their manager and producer, Reno Nicastro. The album debuted at number five on the Australian ARIA albums chart. Shakaya provided three hits on the related ARIA singles chart: "Stop Calling Me" (January 2002), "Sublime" (May) and "Cinderella" (September).

== Background ==
Shakaya's Simone Stacey and Naomi Wenitong met in 1999 while studying a music course in Cairns – both had already started writing songs, separately. They reconnected in August 2001 and formed their duo early in the following year in Cairns. The duo's debut self-titled album appeared in October 2002 via Columbia Records/Sony Music Distribution and was produced by their talent manager and nightclub owner, Reno Nicastro. It peaked at number five on the Australian ARIA albums chart. It also appeared in the Australasian Album Chart, peaking at number two (blocked from the number-one spot by Barricades & Brickwalls by Kasey Chambers). Three singles were issued ahead of the album with the first, "Stop Calling Me" (January 2002), peaking at number five on the ARIA singles chart. The next two singles, "Sublime" (May) and "Cinderella" (September) both reached the top 20. All the tracks on the album were co-written by Stacey and Wenitong, with Nicastro except for "Cinderella".

== Track listing ==
Columbia Records/Sony Music Distribution (SMA 5097552000). All tracks are co-written by Reno Nicastro, Simone Stacey and Naomi Wenitong, unless otherwise noted.

1. "Cinderella" (Vincent Degiorgio, Rebecca Hortlund, George Samuelson, Mikael Lundh, Quint Starkie) – 3:35
2. "Sublime" – 3:19
3. "Everything" – 3:28
4. "Tell Me" – 3:55
5. "Give Me Your Name" – 3:52
6. "Stop Calling Me" – 3:38
7. "Mr DJ" – 3:38
8. "Tell the Truth" – 3:54
9. "Never Tried" – 4:00
10. "Take Another Shot"– 3:45
11. "He's Lookin' Fine" – 3:39

== Charts ==
Chart (2002)	Peak position
Australian ARIA Albums Chart	5
