= Street Warriors =

- Origin: Newcastle, New South Wales, Australia
- Genre: Hip-hop
- Labels: Livestyle Records, GoSet Music
- Spinoff of: Local Knowledge
- Members: Abie Wright; Warwick Wright

Street Warriors are an Australian hip-hop duo. The group is made up of brothers Abie and Warwick Wright from Local Knowledge. They perform in both English and the Awabakal language.

In 2007 Street Warriors released their debut EP, Real Knows Real. This was followed, in 2009, by their debut album, Unstoppable Force, which was launched by Peter Garrett in 2009. It includes appearances by Shannon Noll and Anthony Mundine. The album included a single, "Solid Rock" with Shannon Noll (a re-working of the ARIA Award-winning song by Goanna), which saw them nominated for a Deadly for Single of the Year backing up their deadly nomination in 2008. The group was named Band of the Year at the Deadly Awards 2013.

== Members ==
- Abie "Predator" Wright
- Warrick "Wok" Wright

== Discography ==
=== Albums/EPs ===
- Real Knows Real — Livestyle (2007)
- Unstoppable Force — GoSet Music (2009)

=== Singles ===
- "Solid Rock" with Shannon Noll (2009)
