= Naomi Wenitong =

Australian singer-songwriter

- Also known as: Nay
- Born: Naomi Sky Wenitong; 1982 (age 43–44); Cairns, Queensland, Australia
- Genres: Pop, R&B, soul, hip-hop
- Occupation: Singer-songwriter
- Instrument: Vocals
- Years active: 2001–present
- Member of: Shakaya, The Last Kinection

Naomi Sky Wenitong (born 1982) is an Australian singer-songwriter based in Cairns, Queensland. Under the name, Nay, she is a member of hip hop group, The Last Kinection, alongside her older brother, Joel "Weno" Wenitong, and Jacob "DJ Jaytee" Turier. Previously Wenitong was a member of pop duo Shakaya (2001–2006) with Simone Stacey.

== Early life ==
Wenitong was born in 1982 in Cairns, Queensland to a large extended family belonging to the Kabi Kabi people of South East Queensland. Her father, Mark Wenitong, is a medical practitioner. He became head of the Australian Indigenous Doctor's Association. Her mother, Deb Sisson, studied art. Both her parents were also in bands. Her paternal grandmother was one of the first indigenous health workers in Queensland.

Wenitong was raised in Newcastle, New South Wales and at the age of sixteen she returned to Cairns to study music. Her older brother, Joel Wenitong, is also a musician and from 2002 to 2006 was a member of hip hop group Local Knowledge. They have two other siblings, including a brother, Micah. As from 2011 Micah was the Music NT Indigenous Music Officer in the Northern Territory where he "delivered song writing workshops and assisted with recording".

In 1999 Wenitong attended TAFE North: Cairns campus, studying an ATSIC-sponsored music course. She formed a song writing partnership with fellow singer-songwriter, Simone Stacey, also studying the same course. Wenitong's first job was in a coffee shop.

== Career ==
=== 2001–06: Shakaya ===
In 2001 Wenitong and Stacey formed a pop girl duo, Shakaya. Not long after their inception the group were signed to Sony Music Entertainment. Shakaya's debut single "Stop Calling Me" was released in January 2002, it was co-written by Stacey, Wenitong and Reno Nicastro, their manager and producer. It was the duo's highest charting single, reaching No. 5 on the ARIA Singles Chart.

The group's debut self-titled album, released 5 October 2002, peaked at No. 5 on the ARIA Albums Chart. Shakaya's success saw the group tour with Destiny's Child, Usher, Ja Rule, Ashanti and Shaggy as well as perform all backup vocals and raps for Peter Andre on his 2004 UK tour.

Wenitong and Stacey returned from the United States where they had co-written and recorded Shakaya's second album, Are You Ready (March 2006). Wenitong had become disillusioned with the commercial major label and decided to change directions: so she disbanded the duo. Stacey took a hiatus from the music industry.

=== 2006 to present: The Last Kinection ===
The Last Kinection is a hip-hop group formed in Newcastle by Wenitong in 2006. As "Nay", she was joined by her older brother, Joel "Weno" Wenitong, and his former bandmate, Jacob "DJ Jaytee" Turier. Both Weno and DJ Jaytee had been members of Local Knowledge from 2002 to 2006. Wenitong told Shailla Van Raad of Bma magazine in July 2009, that "The Last Kinection has given me a great opportunity to explore my heritage and my own music", compared to singing songs written by others during her time with Shakaya. The group's two albums, Nutches (2008) and Next of Kin (2011), include tracks co-written by Wenitong.

In September 2008, all three band members were involved in a car accident, with Wenitong receiving serious injuries. Wenitong sustained a broken femur, jaw, wrist, ribs, fractured pelvis, head injuries and was left in a coma. During her recovery Joel, who had driven the car, was distraught, their father Mark recalled "You feel that kind of – especially as a big brother – he really felt that sense of whether it was his fault or not. As he could see her improving, he was improving." The accident was featured in an episode of the Crash Investigation Unit TV series.

At the 2010 Deadly Awards, where she was the co-host with Luke Carroll, Wenitong won the category for Female Artist of the Year.

From series 1 to 3, she went along with Brothablack to co-host Move it Mob Style.

In April 2015 Wenitong, her father Mark and Stacey released cover versions of the songs, "Black Roses" by Inner Circle and "As Long As I Can See the Light" by Creedence Clearwater Revival for the community of Cairns affected by the child killings in December 2014.
