= We Ain't Goin' Down =

Single by Shakaya

from the album Are You Ready
- Released: November 13, 2005 (Australia)
- Recorded: Mothership Studios, London
- Genre: Pop, R&B
- Length: 3:18
- Label: Sony-BMG
- Songwriter(s): Nigel Butler; Ray Hedges; Tracy Ackerman; Abdul Nello
- Producer(s): Ray Hedges

Shakaya singles chronology
"Are You Ready?" (2005)	"We Ain't Goin' Down" (2005)

"We Ain't Goin Down" is the sixth single for the girl duo Shakaya and their second single from their second album Are You Ready. This is Shakaya's final single ever after the group disbanded in 2008.

== Track listing ==
#	We Ain't Goin' Down	Length
Single
1.	"We Ain't Goin' Down"	
2.	"Tryna Find Tha One"	
3.	"Are You Ready" - (Video)	

== Charts ==
Chart (2005)	Peak position
Australian ARIA Singles Chart	50
Australian Urban Singles Chart	18
Australasian Singles Chart	13
