= Silent Despair =

Single by Anna Abreu

from the album Now
- Released: 6 October 2008
- Recorded: 2008
- Genre: Pop
- Length: 3:57
- Label: RCA
- Songwriters: Patric Sarin, Rauli Eskolin, Anna Abreu
- Producer: Rauli Eskolin

Anna Abreu singles chronology
"Vinegar" (2008)	"Silent Despair" (2008)	"Something About U" (2009)

Music video
- "Silent Despair" on YouTube

"Silent Despair" is a song by Finnish singer Anna Abreu from her second studio album, Now (2008). Rauli Eskolin (known professionally as Rake) co-wrote the song with Patric Sarin and Abreu. The single marked Abreu's first release to credit her as a songwriter. "Silent Despair" was produced by Eskolin at Inkfish Studios, Helsinki and is a pop ballad. The song was released on 6 October 2008 in Finland, as the album's second single, two weeks before the release of the album.

== Lyrical content ==
"Silent Depair" is a melancholic ballad that focuses upon a relationship that has become tainted and filled with 'silent despair' - unspoken but negative feelings. Abreu sings 'I couldn't stand losing you' and struggles to accept the inevitability of the relationship's end. The crumbling of the relationship is compared to 'no sun shining after the rain' and 'no laughter to conquer the pain'.

== Chart performance ==
Released mainly to promote the album, "Silent Despair" did not chart on the Top 20 Singles but it did peak at number twenty-five on Finland's Download Chart. It also performed very well on radio, reaching number two on the Airplay Chart.

Chart (2008)	Peak position
Finland (Digital)	25
Finland (Radio)	2

== Music video ==
The music video for "Silent Despair" was directed by Misko Iho and takes place in what appears to be Abreu's apartment. The video features shots of Abreu lying on the couch and in the bathtub singing. This is interspersed with reverse slow-motion shots of a shattered wine reforming and going back into Abreu's outstretched hand, revealing that she threw it against the wall in anger after her partner left her.

== Live performances ==
"Silent Despair" has become a regular song performed by Abreu at her concerts. Although not on every date, she has performed the song on almost every tour, from 2008's Now Tour to 2014's V Tour.

== Track listing ==
1. "Silent Despair" – 3:57

== Credits and personnel ==
- Songwriting – Patric Sarin, Rauli Eskolin, Anna Abreu
- Production - Rauli Eskolin
- Engineering - Rauli Eskolin (at Inkfish Studios: Helsinki, Finland)
- Instruments - Rauli Eskolin
- Lead vocals - Anna Abreu
- Backing vocals - Anna Abreu
- Mixing - Rauli Eskolin

== Release history ==
Region	Date	Format	Label
Finland	6 October 2008	CD single, Digital download	RCA
