= Music Everywhere =

Single by Anna Abreu

from the album Just a Pretty Face?
- Released: 10 August 2009
- Recorded: 2009
- Genre: Pop, Electro, Eurodance
- Length: 3:16
- Label: RCA
- Songwriter(s): Patric Sarin, Rauli Eskolin, Eva Peijakas
- Producer(s): Rauli Eskolin

Anna Abreu singles chronology
"Come Undone" (2009)	"Music Everywhere" (2009)	"Impatient" (2009)

Music video
- "Music Everywhere" on YouTube

"Music Everywhere" is a song by Finnish singer Anna Abreu from her third studio album, Just a Pretty Face? (2009). Rauli Eskolin (known professionally as Rake) co-wrote the song with Patric Sarin and Eva Peijakas. Eskolin, who has previously worked on Abreu's first two albums Anna Abreu and Now, also produced the song. "Music Everywhere" is a Pop song which continued Abreu's move into dance-inspired music, with its Electro and Eurodance elements. The song was released on 10 August 2009 in Finland, as the album's lead single.

== Lyrical content ==
"Music Everywhere" in an up-tempo dance-pop song that celebrate Abreu's love for music and the joy and excitement that it brings her and others. Abreu sings that she finds 'salvation' in music (including her own) being 'on heavy rotation', and that when 'music is everywhere' then life is much more exciting and positive. The final verse of the song also reflects upon Abreu's strong beliefs in her own musical direction and that she will not change simply to please the 'suits', stating that she 'won't budge', finally ending with the statement 'I am who I am and that's more than enough'.

== Chart performance ==
"Music Everywhere" initially debuted at number four on the Finnish Top 20 Singles Chart, before moving up to number two in its sixth week weeks later, becoming Abreu's fourth top ten hit and her third top five hit. It remained on the chart for twenty-three weeks. To date, it is Abreu's longest-running single on the chart. "Music Everywhere" also reached number six on the Finnish Download Chart and number four on the Airplay Chart.

Chart (2009)	Peak position
Finland (Top 20 Singles)	2
Finland (Digital)	6
Finland (Radio)	4

== Music video ==
The music video for "Music Everywhere" was directed by Mikko Harma, and was shot mainly at Helsinki airport. The video begins with Abreu, wearing a dressing gown and slippers, exiting a camper van and entering the airport hangar, where stylists begin to make her over. This is filmed in greyscale, which changes to full colour when the song's chorus begins. Abreu is then seen singing and dancing in an empty airport hangar. This is interspersed with shots of her riding a motorcycle and dancing in both a limousine and on the airport runway. Abreu then appears wearing the blue and gold dress from the cover art of Just a Pretty Face?, dancing and swining in a circular trapeze, which can also been as part of the photography inside the album sleeve.

== Live performances ==
Abreu performed the song on television at the 2009 Finnish version of Children In Need, wearing the blue and gold dress seen in the music video and the Just a Pretty Face? album cover. It has since become Abreau's fourth most performed song when on tour.

== Track listing ==
1. "Music Everywhere" – 3:16

== Credits and personnel ==
- Songwriting – Patric Sarin, Rauli Eskolin, Eva Peijakas
- Production - Rauli Eskolin
- Engineering - Rauli Eskolin (at Inkfish Studios: Helsinki, Finland)
- Instruments - Rauli Eskolin
- Lead vocals - Anna Abreu
- Backing vocals - Anna Abreu
- Mixing - Rauli Eskolin

== Release history ==
Region	Date	Format	Label
Finland	10 August 2009	CD single, Digital download	RCA
