= V (Anna Abreu album) =

Studio album by Anna Abreu
- Released: May 30, 2014
- Recorded: October 2013 – April 2014
- Genre: Pop, R&B, dance
- Length: 34:51
- Label: Warner Bros.
- Producer: Jonas Karlsson, Jarkko Ehnqvist, Hank Solo

Anna Abreu chronology
Greatest Hits (2012)	V (2014)	Sensuroimaton Versio (2016)

Singles from V
- 1. "Ra-Ta Ta-Ta" Released: April 1, 2014; 2. "Right In Front Of You" Released: June 2, 2014

V is the fifth studio album by Finnish singer Anna Abreu, released in Finland by Warner Bros. Records on May 30, 2014. The album was preceded by the lead single "Ra-Ta Ta-Ta" and followed by the single "Right In Front Of You". The album marked Abreu's first studio album in three years, following her fourth album Rush. It was also Abreu's first album released under Warner Bros. Records, which she signed with in 2012 after deciding not to renew her contract with Sony Music and RCA.

The album was produced by Jonas Karlsson, Jarkko Ehnqvist and Hank Solo, and features collaborations with Danish pop singer Christopher and Finnish rapper Gracias. The album debuted and peaked at number 4 on the Finnish Albums Chart, becoming Abreu's first album to miss the top two. However, the album continued to be a commercial and critical success for Abreu, being certified gold for sales in excess of 10,000 copies.

== Commercial performance ==
V debuted and peaked at number four on the Finnish Top 50 Albums Chart. To date it has sold over 10,000 copies and been certified gold by the IFPI.

=== Chart performance ===
Chart	Peak position	Certification	Sales
Finnish Albums Chart	4	Gold	10,000

== Singles ==
- "Ra-Ta Ta-Ta", the lead single from the album debuted and peaked at number 17 on the Finnish Top 20 Singles Chart and reached a peak of number 4 on the radio airplay chart. The music video, directed by Hannu Aukia, has been viewed over 1,000,000 times on YouTube. The video sees Abreu dancing in an underground carpark, partying in a roller-rink and singing in a dark room while covered in silver glitter.
- "Right In Front Of You", the album's second single, was released to radio stations on June 2, 2014. The 90's inspired music video was directed by Taito Kawata and features Abreu and a large group of friends dancing in a range of places in and around the Finnish capital city of Helsinki.

== Track listing ==
No.	Title	Writer(s)	Producer(s)	Length
1.	"Werewolves"	Jonas Karlsson, Hank Solo	Jonas Karlsson, Hank Solo	3:21
2.	"Right In Front Of You"	Karlsson, Axel Ehnström	Jonas Karlsson	3:26
3.	"Ra-Ta Ta-Ta"	Karlsson, Solo, Anna Abreu	Jonas Karlsson, Hank Solo	3:08
4.	"No Apology"	Henri Lanz, Will Rappaport, Carolyn Jordan, Amanda Leigh Wilson	Jonas Karlsson	3:54
5.	"Kings & Queens (feat. Gracias)"	Karlsson, Jarkko Ehnqvist, Abreu, Ehnström, Gracias	Jarkko Ehnqvist	3:07
6.	"Oh Oh"	Karlsson, Ehnqvist, Alice Gernandt, Johan Ramstrom, Lauren Dyson	Jonas Karlsson	3:26
7.	"Horizon (feat. Christopher)"	Karlsson, Ehnqvist, Ehnström, Abreu, Christopher	Jonas Karlsson, Jarkko Ehnqvist	2:57
8.	"Like A Boxer"	Karlsson, Solo	Jonas Karlsson, Hank Solo	3:49
9.	"High & Dry"	Thomas Kirjonen, Anna Aberg, Mats Takila	Jonas Karlsson	4:13
10.	"Feels Like Freedom"	Karlsson, Ehnqvist, Ylva Dimberg, Abreu, Ehnström	Jonas Karlsson	3:30
Total length:				34:51

== Promotion ==
V Tour
- Tour by Anna Abreu
- Associated album: V
- Start date: May 31, 2014
- End date: July 26, 2014
- Legs: 1
- No. of shows: 6 in Finland

Anna Abreu concert chronology
- Over and Out Tour (2012); V Tour (2014); TBA

In 2014, Abreu promoted her fifth album with the V Tour throughout Finland.

=== Setlist ===
Finland
1. "Werewolves"
2. "Like A Boxer"
3. "Stereo"
4. "Hysteria" (performed at selected venues)
5. "Music Everywhere" (performed at selected venues)
6. "Silent Despair" (performed at selected venues)
7. "Worst Part Is Over" (performed at selected venues)
8. "End of Love" (performed at selected venues)
9. "Vinegar" (performed at selected venues)
10. "Be With You" (performed at selected venues)
11. "Ra-Ta Ta-Ta"
12. "Right In Front Of You" (performed at selected venues)
13. "Kings & Queens" (performed at selected venues)
14. "No Apology" (performed at selected venues)
15. "High & Dry" (performed at selected venues)
16. "Huominen on Huomenna" (performed at selected venues)
17. "Kylmästä Lämpimään"

=== Tour dates ===
Date	City	Country	Venue
May 31, 2014	Oulu	Finland	Kauppatori
June 4, 2014	Helsinki	Finland	Tavastia
June 12, 2014	Helsinki	Finland	Kaisaniemi
June 21, 2014	Jämsä	Finland	Himos Festival
July 5, 2015	Turku	Finland	Ruissalo
July 26, 2014	Oulu	Finland	Kuusisaari
