= Worst Part Is Over =

Single by Anna Abreu

from the album Rush
- Released: 25 April 2011
- Recorded: 2010
- Genre: Pop, Rap
- Length: 3:38
- Label: RCA
- Songwriter(s): Redrama, Anna Abreu, Jukka Immonen
- Producer(s): Jukka Immonen

Anna Abreu singles chronology
"Hysteria" (2011)	"Worst Part Is Over" (2011)	"Stereo" (2011)

"Worst Part Is Over" is a song by Finnish singer Anna Abreu from her fourth studio album, Rush (2011) and features Finnish rapper Redrama. It marked Abreu's first release as a collaboration. Abreu co-wrote the song alongside Redrama and Jukka Immonen, who also produced the song. "Worst Part Is Over" is a Pop song that, thanks to the contribution from Redrama, features a Rap segment. The song was released on 25 April 2011 in Finland, as the album's second single.

== Lyrical content ==
"Worst Part Is Over" is a pop song with rap elements due to Redrama's verse. Lyrically, the song is about coping with losing someone, though exactly who is not made completely explicit and therefore it is ambiguous: it can be interpreted as the loss of a relationship, or a family member or close friend. Abreu sings that although a person might feel 'alone in the dark' when going through such a period in their life, they should draw strength and that 'when it gets hard, you gotta stay strong'. Abreu promises 'it's always the darkest before you see the light'. The interpretation of the song being about retaining inner strength after the breakdown of a relationship can be seen in lyrics such as 'we lost the spark and that's the worst part' and 'don't give up don't let nobody break you down'.

== Chart performance ==
"Worst Part Is Over" reached number twenty-five on the Finnish Download Chart and number twelve on the official Radio Airplay Chart.

Chart (2011)	Peak position
Finland (Digital)	25
Finland (Radio)	12

== Live performances ==
"Worst Part Is Over" was performed during the Top 4 results show of the fifth series of Idols on 17 April 2011. It was the first time that Abreu had returned to perform on the show since finishing as runner-up in 2007. Redrama joined Abreu on stage for the performance.

== Credits and personnel ==
- Songwriting – Redrama, Anna Abreu, Jukka Immonen
- Production - Jukka Immonen
- Engineering - Jukka Immonen (at Fried Music Studios: Helsinki, Finland)
- Instruments - Jukka Immonen, Joakim Bachmann (drums)
- Lead vocals - Anna Abreu, Redrama
- Backing vocals - Anna Abreu
- Mixing - Jukka Immonen, Arttu Peljo

== Release history ==
Region	Date	Format	Label
Finland	25 April 2011	CD single, Digital download	RCA
