= Ivory Tower (Anna Abreu song) =

Single by Anna Abreu

from the album Anna Abreu
- Released: 15 October 2007
- Recorded: 2007
- Genre: Pop, R&B
- Length: 3:47
- Label: RCA
- Songwriter(s): Rauli Eskolin
- Producer(s): Rauli Eskolin

Anna Abreu singles chronology
"End of Love" (2007)	"Ivory Tower" (2007)	"Are You Ready" (2008)

Music video
- "Ivory Tower" on YouTube

"Ivory Tower" is a song by Finnish singer Anna Abreu from her debut studio album, Anna Abreu (2007). Rauli Eskolin (known professionally as Rake) wrote and produced the song along with Teemu Brunila. It is a Pop song with R&B rhythms. The song was released on 15 October 2007 in Finland as the album's second single.

== Lyrical content ==
"Ivory Tower" explores a difficult relationship in which Abreu is unsure if the relationship has failed; although she doesn't know why, she sings "I think that you do". She states "uptown, downtown they're telling all kind of lies", insinuating that gossip and rumours have interfered with the relationship and that her partner is too easily swayed. She begs him to "open up your eyes" and tries to assure him that she will always be there for him and that she misses him so much that she feels like she is going "crazy". The 'Ivory Tower' of the song's title refers to the metaphorical, wishful place where Abreu believes that her partner is, unable to connect with the reality of how positive the relationship could potentially be.

== Chart performance ==
"Ivory Tower" initially debuted at number seventeen on the Finnish Top 20 Singles Chart in late 2007, before re-entering the chart in the second week of 2008 and peaking at number five. The song also hit number two on the Finnish Download Chart, as well as number one on the Radio Airplay Chart, becoming Abreu's second number one single.

Chart (2007)	Peak position
Finland (Top 20 Singles)	5
Finland (Digital)	2
Finland (Radio)	1

== Music video ==
The music video for "Ivory Tower" was directed by Jaakko Manninen and filmed in front of a green screen. As a result, everything in the video is computer-generated except for Abreu herself and the male backing dancers. The video features a white background, while Abreu and her backing dancers are in grayscale. Red and purple 'clouds' erupt in the background, while lyrics from the song drift across the screen in grey typography.

== Live performances ==
"Ivory Tower" has become one of Abreu's most popular songs to be performed live and is a staple of her tour setlists. To date, it is her third most-performed song, having been performed at at least one show during all of her tours.

== Credits and personnel ==
- Songwriting – Rauli Eskolin
- Production - Rauli Eskolin
- Engineering - Rauli Eskolin (at Inkfish Studios: Helsinki, Finland)
- Instruments - Rauli Eskolin
- Lead vocals - Anna Abreu
- Backing vocals - Anna Abreu, Rauli Eskolin
- Mixing - Rauli Eskolin

== Release history ==
Region	Date	Format	Label
Finland	15 October 2007	CD single, Digital download	RCA
