= Stereo (Anna Abreu song) =

Single by Anna Abreu

from the album Rush
- Released: 25 August 2011
- Recorded: 2010
- Genre: Pop, Dance
- Length: 4:05
- Label: RCA
- Songwriter(s): Bryn Christopher, Jukka Immonen, Ali Tennant
- Producer(s): Jukka Immonen

Anna Abreu singles chronology
"Worst Part Is Over" (2011)	"Stereo" (2011)	"Be With You" (2011)

Music video
- "Stereo" on YouTube

"Stereo" is a song by Finnish singer Anna Abreu from her fourth studio album, Rush (2011). It was co-written by Bryn Christopher, Jukka Immonen (who also produced the track) and Ali Tennant. "Stereo" is a Pop song with Dance elements and was released on 25 August 2011 in Finland, as the album's third single.

== Lyrical content ==
"Stereo" is an up-tempo song about the anger and hurt faced at the end of a relationship, and the difficulty presented by the need to move on. This idea is presented through the stereo which 'don't play love songs at all', reflecting the common practice of refusing or being unable to listen to love songs after the end of a long-term relationship because it causes emotional pain. The song also references the universal cliche of one partner saying that they can remain friends, with Abreu angrily singing 'I don't wanna be your friend' before stating 'but baby don't let me go', reflecting the difficulty with accepting the end of the relationship.

== Chart performance ==
"Stereo" peaked at number twenty-four on the Finnish Download Chart. The song also enjoyed heavy airplay and peaked at number two on the Radio Airplay Chart, becoming Abreu's sixth top five hit on that chart.

Chart (2011)	Peak position
Finland (Digital)	24
Finland (Radio)	2

== Music video ==
The music video for "Stereo" was directed by Jaakko Itäaho and filmed in and around Raseborg Castle. The snow-capped mountains in the background do not exist in real life and were achieved via CGI. The video depicts Abreu as a young woman going to become a nun in a convent which is located at the castle. During the video, Abreu changes into a nun's habit and the other nuns act as her backing dancers. At night, Abreu is seduced by another young nun and the two escape from the convent by climbing out of one of the windows.

== Live performances ==
"Stereo" was performed as part of Abreu's setlist when she supported Enrique Iglesias during his Euphoria Tour in April 2011. Abreu was the support act during the April 6 date at Turku's HK Arean and Helsinki's Hartwall Arena. In February 2012, Abreu performed "Stereo" live on the televised Uuden Musiikin Kilpailu final, when Finland searched for a participant for the 2012 Eurovision Song Contest. It has since become her fifth most performed song when on tour.

== Credits and personnel ==
- Songwriting – Bryn Christopher, Jukka Immonen, Ali Tennant
- Production - Jukka Immonen
- Engineering - Jukka Immonen (at Fried Music Studios: Helsinki, Finland)
- Instruments - Jukka Immonen, Joakim Bachmann (drums)
- Lead vocals - Anna Abreu
- Backing vocals - Anna Abreu
- Mixing - Jukka Immonen, Arttu Peljo

== Release history ==
Region	Date	Format	Label
Finland	25 August 2011	CD single, Digital download	RCA
