= Stop Calling Me =

2002 single by Shakaya

Single by Shakaya

from the album Shakaya
- Released: 21 January 2002
- Studio: Megatrax (Cairns, Australia)
- Length: 3:38
- Label: Columbia
- Songwriters: Reno Nicastro, Simone Stacey, Naomi Wenitong
- Producer: Reno Nicastro

Shakaya singles chronology
"Stop Calling Me" (2002)	"Sublime" (2002)

Audio video
- "Stop Calling Me" on YouTube

"Stop Calling Me" is a song written by Reno Nicastro, Simone Stacey and Naomi Wenitong, produced by Nicastro for Australian music duo Shakaya's first album, Shakaya (2002). The song is about relationships, about "boyfriends who keep calling after the relationship is over". It was released as the album's first single on 21 January 2002 as a CD single. It became Shakaya's most successful single in Australia, peaking at number five on the Australian ARIA Singles Chart.

== Lyrical content ==
The song is about real-life experiences Stacey and Wenitong have had, and states that it is basically talking about boyfriends who keep calling after the relationship is over. They wrote the song when they were discussing with friends about stories of how to get unwanted attention away from ex-lovers, so they thought it would be fun to write a song about it. Stacey states "The message in this song is also about being straight up with people and just simply saying 'Look mate, just stop calling me' instead of leading a person on. This goes out to guys and girls."

== Promotion and chart performance ==
Promotion for the song included being a support act with Human Nature and Destiny's Child on their World Tour in Australia and New Zealand. The duo claim that supporting Destiny's Child was "a spin out" because the band shook their hands and welcomed the duo to the tour and thanked the girls for joining them. They also performed the song on the Australian chat show The Panel on 17 April, participated in online web chats and performed at the Australian Fashion Week on 11 May. They also did an instore appearance in Sydney, at the Miranda Westfield shopping centre.

The song debuted on the Australian ARIA Singles Chart on 28 January 2002 at number 45; it went on to peak at number five and spend 17 weeks in the top 50. "Stop Calling Me" was accredited platinum by ARIA and was the 43rd-highest-selling single for 2002. In 2002 the song was nominated for an ARIA Award for "Highest Selling Single" but lost to "Can't Get You Out of My Head" by Kylie Minogue.

== Music video ==
The music video for the song was filmed at Tom Cruise and Nicole Kidman's ex-penthouse in Sydney, Australia. Stacey stated, "We were looking around to see if they left anything behind. It was a beautiful apartment and we pretended it was ours for the day." It was released in January 2002 and shows a man stalking Stacey and Wenitong. The video opens up to an answering machine saying "you have fifty-seven messages" then the number of messages on the phone keeps going up. It shows Stacey and Wenitong dancing in a house, on a couch and laying on a bed while a man keeps ringing the doorbell holding flowers and chocolates. By the end of the music video the messages on the answering machine stops at ninety-nine messages and the man stalking the girls gives up and drops the flowers on a cleaner lady's trolly, the cleaner lady thinks it is for her so she calls him ending the video.

== Track listing ==
Australian CD single

1. "Stop Calling Me" (radio edit)
2. "Stop Calling Me" (house mix, Mobin Master & Dj Hess)
3. "Stop Calling Me" (Nurban mix, New Breed)
4. "Stop Calling Me" (Gomez mix)

== Charts ==
=== Weekly charts ===
Chart (2002)	Peak position
Australia (ARIA)	5
Australian Urban (ARIA)	2

=== Year-end charts ===
Chart (2002)	Position
Australia (ARIA)	43
Australian Urban (ARIA)	18

== Certifications ==
Region	Certification	Certified units/sales
Australia (ARIA)	Platinum	70,000^{^}
^{^} Shipments figures based on certification alone.
