= Right in Front of You (Anna Abreu song) =

"Right In Front Of You"

Single by Anna Abreu

from the album V
- Released: 2 June 2014
- Recorded: 2014
- Genre: Pop, dance, disco
- Length: 3:26
- Label: Warner Bros. Records
- Songwriter(s): Jonas Karlsson, Axel Ehnström
- Producer(s): Jonas Karlsson

Anna Abreu singles chronology
"Ra-Ta Ta-Ta" (2014)	"Right In Front Of You" (2014)	"Grindaa ja flowaa" (2016)

Music video
- "Right In Front Of You" on YouTube

"Right in Front of You" is a song by Finnish singer Anna Abreu from her fifth studio album, V (2014). The song was written by Jonas Karlsson and Axel Ehnström, with Karlsson also producing the track. "Right In Front Of You" is a Pop song with Dance and Disco elements. The song was released on 2 June 2014 in Finland, as the album's second single.

== Lyrical content ==
Lyrically, the up-tempo 'Right In Front Of You' explores the idea that people often search for things that they believe are so far away from them, without realising that they're under their noses. Abreu sings that 'everything you've ever been dreaming of is there, right in front of you'.

== Chart performance ==
"Right In Front Of You" has so far peaked at number twenty-two on the Finnish Downland Chart and number fifty-nine on the Radio Airplay Chart.

Chart (2014)	Peak position
Finland (Digital)	21
Finland (Radio)	44

== Music video ==
The music video for "Right In Front Of You" was directed by Taito Kawatan and features Abreu singing in a range of places in and around Helsinki, including a recording studio, a park, an outdoor pool, an outdoor sporting venue, and a nightclub. The video features hundreds of back dancers, making it one of the most complex music videos of Abreu's career. Abreu and the dancers wear 90s-inspired clothing throughout the video.

== Live performances ==
"Right In Front Of You" was performed at a range of music festivals across Finland during the summer of 2014, and as part of Abreu's 2014 V Tour.

== Credits and personnel ==
- Songwriting – Jonas Karlsson, Axel Ehnström
- Production - Jonas Karlsson
- Engineering - Jonas Karlsson (at Fried Music Studios: Helsinki, Finland)
- Instruments - Axel Ehnström (piano, bass); Aleksi Ahoniemi, Juha Kortehisto, Jukka Eskola (horns)
- Lead vocals - Anna Abreu
- Backing vocals - Anna Abreu
- Mixing - Arttu Peljo

== Release history ==
Region	Date	Format	Label
Finland	2 June 2014	CD single, Digital download	Warner Bros. Records
