= Cairns child killings =

Familicide in Cairns, Australia

- Location: Manoora, Cairns, Queensland, Australia
- Date: 18–19 December 2014
- Attack type: Pedicide, mass stabbing, mass murder,Filicide,Familicide
- Weapon: Knife or knives
- Deaths: 8
- Injuries: 1 (the perpetrator)
- Perpetrator: Raina Mersane Ina Thaiday

On 19 December 2014, eight children were found stabbed to death at a home in the Australian city of Cairns. Raina Thaiday, the mother of seven of the children and the aunt of the eighth, was charged with eight counts of murder in relation to the killings, but in 2017 was deemed unfit to stand trial by reason of insanity, following a diagnosis of schizophrenia. She was detained indefinitely at a psychiatric facility. The killings took place in the Cairns suburb of Manoora, with the victims aged between 18 months and 14 years. The bodies, with stab wounds, were discovered by the children's 20-year-old brother.

== Victims and discovery ==
Eight children were killed, four boys and four girls, ranging in age from two to 14 years old. Seven of the eight were siblings or half-siblings, and the eighth was their cousin. Their family had ties across Australia, including in Perth.

The victim's bodies were discovered by Thaiday's 20-year-old son when he visited the house at around 11:00 a.m. on 19 December 2014. She allegedly told him "I've killed them". She was subsequently hospitalised for "35 self-inflicted stab wounds, including to the chest and neck". Police believe Thaiday drugged the children before the attack took place, as no one reported that they heard the victims during the attack. However, no drugs were found at the crime scene.

Neighbours had reported that fighting could be heard from the house the night before and in the early hours of the morning. It was also reported that Thaiday had thrown her family's possessions onto the front lawn of the property prior to the killings, and had been observed by neighbours yelling in the street.

== Perpetrator ==
The perpetrator of the killings was Raina Mersane Ina Thaiday, also known as Mersane Warria, a 37-year-old Torres Strait Islander woman who had no previous criminal history. She was a single mother to seven of the children and also the aunt of the eighth. She reportedly had untreated mental health issues and was under financial stress at the time of the killings. She was said to be a long-time cannabis user, but had recently banned alcohol and drugs from the house. She was also said to have developed extreme religious views, including making public proclamations about "Papa God", and to have attended multiple churches "seeking counsel".

On 21 December 2014, Thaiday was charged with eight counts of murder. She was subsequently moved to a mental health facility in Brisbane, with a preliminary hearing to occur in Cairns on 30 January 2015. In April 2017, Queensland's Mental Health Court ruled that Thaiday was of "unsound mind" at the time of the killings, and thus (under Queensland law) not criminally responsible. She was reportedly diagnosed with "psychosis stemming from undiagnosed schizophrenia". One examining psychiatrist found that "she in some way believed she would be saving the children from the end of the world", while another found that she was in an "apocalyptic delusional state" at the time of the killings and described it as "schizophrenia at its very depth and its worst in terms of the terror for the patient, as well as the consequences for the individuals killed".

As of May 2017, Thaiday was being held for treatment at the Park Centre for Mental Health, within a secure ward. It was reported around the same time that she "had been slow to respond to treatment and was at high risk of relapsing". In 2024, on the 10th anniversary of the killings, it was reported that she remained detained under a mental health order.

== Aftermath ==
The Torres Strait Island Regional Council requested respect for privacy and cultural responsibilities, adding it was inappropriate to comment due to "strict cultural protocols". The children's funeral was held on 10 January 2015 at Cairns Convention Centre. The house was removed. Eight frangipani trees were planted on the site as a memorial.
