= Just a Pretty Face? =

Studio album by Anna Abreu
- Released: October 21, 2009
- Recorded: July – August 2009
- Genre: Pop, R&B, dance, electropop
- Label: RCA
- Producer: Rauli Eskolin, Patric Sarin, GoodWill & MGI

Anna Abreu chronology
Now (2008)	Just a Pretty Face? (2009)	Rush (2011)

Singles from Just a Pretty Face?
- 1. "Music Everywhere" Released: August 10, 2009; 2. "Impatient" Released: November 9, 2009; 3. "Slam" Released: February 22, 2010

Just a Pretty Face? is the third studio album by Finnish singer Anna Abreu, released in Finland by RCA on October 21, 2009. The album was preceded by the lead single "Music Everywhere" and followed by the promotional singles "Impatient" and "Slam".

The album was primarily produced by Abreu's long-time collaborator Rauli Eskolin, who had been responsible for the success of her previous, dance-infused album Now. It was the first of Abreu's albums to feature the rap genre, with the song "Capital C" featuring a rap segment. In its first day of release alone, the album sold 23,000 copies and was certified gold, becoming one of the fastest selling records in Finnish music history. Ordinarily, the album would have reached number one in its first week. However, the same week also saw the release of two other high-profile albums and as a result, Just A Pretty Face? debuted at number three on the Finnish albums chart.

== Commercial performance ==
Just a Pretty Face? debuted at number three on the Finnish Top 40 albums chart, a position it held for three weeks. In its seventh week, it reached its chart peak of number two. In its first day of release alone, the album sold 23,000. To date it has sold over 30,000 copies, becoming Abreu's third consecutive platinum album.

=== Chart performance ===
Chart	Peak position	Certification	Sales
Finnish Albums Chart	2	Platinum	33,278

== Singles ==
- "Music Everywhere", the lead single from the album debuted at number 4 on the Finnish singles chart, peaking at number 2 after Abreu's live performance of the song at the Finnish Children In Need event. It became Abreu's third top five hit following "End of Love" from her self-titled debut album and "Vinegar", the number 1 smash hit from her 2008 album Now. The song also reached number six on the Digital Download chart and number four on the Airplay Chart.
- "Impatient", the album's second single, was released to radio stations on November 9, 2009. Although accompanied by a music video, the single was used only to promote the album and therefore did not impact the singles chart. It still received good radio airplay and charted at number twenty-one on the Airplay Chart.
- "Slam", became the album's third single on February 22, 2010, and like its predecessor, was also only released as a promotional single. However, Abreu did perform the song live on the first series of the X Factor in 2010.

== Track listing ==
No.	Title	Writer(s)	Producer(s)	Length
1.	"Music Everywhere"	Patric Sarin, Rauli Eskolin, Eva Peijakas	Rauli Eskolin	3:16
2.	"Liquid"	Eskolin, Sarin, Anna Abreu	Rauli Eskolin	3:43
3.	"Aural Exam"	Eskolin, Peijakas, Abreu	Rauli Eskolin	4:02
4.	"Impatient"	Eskolin, Sarin, Abreu	Rauli Eskolin	3:45
5.	"Mr. Perfect"	Osmo Ikonen, Kimmo Laiho	Rauli Eskolin	3:39
6.	"7 Days, 7 Nights"	Veikka Erkola, Street Kobra, Eskolin, Abreu	Rauli Eskolin, Veikka Erkola, Street Kobra	3:49
7.	"Letting Me Go"	Erkola, Kobra, Paula Vesala	Rauli Eskolin, Veikka Erkola, Street Kobra	3:25
8.	"Shine"	Will Rappaport, Henri Lanz, Tenna Torres	Rauli Eskolin	3:45
9.	"Slam"	Steve Lee, Sarin	Rauli Eskolin, Patric Sarin	3:00
10.	"Capital C"	Eskolin, Peijakas, Abreu	Rauli Eskolin	3:46
11.	"2nd Chance"	David Astrom, Patrik Berggren, Jonas Myrin	Rauli Eskolin	3:23
12.	"Do Avesso"	Abreu, Marina Alberto	Rauli Eskolin	4:13
Total length:				43:44

Digital Bonus Content
No.	Title	Writer(s)	Producer(s)	Length
13.	"Showdown"	Eskolin	Rauli Eskolin	3:49

== Promotion ==
Just a Pretty Face? Tour
- Tour by Anna Abreu
- Associated album: Just a Pretty Face?
- Start date: October 15, 2009
- End date: August 14, 2010
- Legs: 1
- No. of shows: 8 in Finland

Anna Abreu concert chronology
- Now Tour (2008-2009); Just a Pretty Face? Tour (2009-2010); Rush Tour (2011)

From 2009 to 2010, Abreu promoted her third album with the Just a Pretty Face? Tour throughout Finland. Her Walking On Water show, which was a one-off held aboard the M/S Silja Symphony in Helsinki was also used to promote the album.

=== Setlist ===
Finland - Just a Pretty Face?
1. "Mr. Perfect" (performed at selected venues)
2. "Vinegar"
3. "Something About U" (performed at selected venues)
4. "Walking On Water"
5. "Letting Me Go" (performed at selected venues)
6. "No Estagues El Momento" (performed at selected venues)
7. "Impatient"
8. "Everywhere I Go" (performed at selected venues)
9. "Ivory Tower" (performed at selected venues)
10. "Come Undone" (performed at selected venues)
11. "Silent Despair"
12. "Slam"
13. "Contigo Corazon" (performed at selected venues)
14. "7 Days, 7 Nights"
15. "Capital C"
16. "Liquid"
17. "You Don't Get Me" (performed at selected venues)
18. "Music Everywhere"
Finland - Walking On Water
1. "Ivory Tower"
2. "Capital C"
3. "Liquid"
4. "Slam"
5. "Impatient"
6. "2nd Chance"
7. "Impatient"
8. "Solta-se O Beijo"
9. "Contigo Corazon"
10. "No Estragues El Momento"
11. "La Tortura" (Shakira cover)
12. "Vinegar"
13. "You Don't Get Me"
14. "Walking On Water
15. "7 Days, 7 Nights"
16. "End of Love"
17. "Everywhere I Go"
18. "Music Everywhere"

=== Tour dates ===
Date	City	Country	Venue
October 15, 2009	Turku	Finland	M/S Viking Live Gabriella
December 11, 2009	Ylivieska	Finland	Akustiikka
March 14, 2010	Alahärmä	Finland	Power Park
May 29, 2010	Nurmijärvi	Finland	Nurmirock
June 16, 2010	Jyväskylä	Finland	Sataman Yö
August 6, 2010	Joensuu	Finland	Musiikkifestivaali
August 14, 2010	Laukaa	Finland	Sararock
October 15, 2010	Helsinki	Finland	M/S Silja Symphony
