= Shakaya =

Australian girl group

- Origin: Cairns, Queensland, Australia
- Genres: Pop, R&B
- Years active: 2002–2006, 2021–present
- Labels: Columbia
- Members: Simone Stacey; Naomi Wenitong

Shakaya are an Australian girl group formed in Cairns, Queensland, in 2002 by Simone Stacey and Naomi Wenitong. The two met in 1999 while studying an Aboriginal and Torres Strait Islander music course and they had both been writing individually before they met each other. The girls were initially discovered in Cairns by Reno Nicastro and Michael Pearson-Adams. Nicastro produced most of the girls' songs and gave them free studio time for two years.

The band's name, 'Shakaya', was originally going to be 'Kashaya', but then their manager mixed the letters around and it became 'Shakaya'. Stacey and Wenitong did some research and found out that the word "shakaya" has many meanings in various cultures. The one that really stood out for them was the meaning "voices in the wind" (which they incorrectly credit as "Native American Indian", but is actually a Hindu female name). For a time, Shakaya became Australia's most successful female urban pop act and they toured with Destiny's Child, Usher, Kylie Minogue and Ja Rule.

Naomi went on to become a member of the hip hop group The Last Kinection. In April 2013, Simone auditioned for Season 2 of The Voice Australia and after successfully having three judges turn their chairs she chose Seal as her coach.

== Music career ==
=== 2002–2003: Shakaya ===
The girls were in Sydney in August 2001 and that morning they had a showcase lined up at Sony Music. It was a small, intimate room where they had to perform and they performed four songs. At the end of it, they walked out of the room and within five minutes Sony Music came back and told them they were signed. On 18 January 2002, the duo released their first and debut song called "Stop Calling Me". It is a song about stalking situations based on a real-life experience that they and their male and female friends have had. The song entered the charts at number forty-five on 25 February 2002. The song rose up the charts from then on and because of more airplay the song managed to peak into the top ten at number five. It became Shakaya's biggest hit of their career, being certified platinum by ARIA, becoming the forty-third highest selling single for 2002, and being nominated for the "Highest Selling Single" for the 2002 ARIA Awards. The second song released was "Sublime", released in Australia on 17 May 2002 and became the duo's second top twenty single peaking at number nineteen in June 2002. "Cinderella" was the third and last song released by the duo; it became their third top twenty single, peaking at number sixteen, and it was certified gold by ARIA. Their debut self-titled album Shakaya was finally released in Australia on 18 October 2002 and was received well, debuting in the charts at number five on 28 October 2002. The album fell to number forty-eight the next week and only spent seven weeks in the top one hundred. On 14 April 2003 the band released a cover version of the Michael Jackson hit "The Way You Make Me Feel"; the girls said it was amazing to cover of one of his songs because he is the King of Pop. The song had a minor success on the charts peaking at number twenty-one and staying in the top fifty for seven weeks.

=== 2005–2006: Are You Ready ===
Are You Ready was recorded over an eighteen-month period in Cairns, Sydney and the United States with a range of producers. The first song released from the album was titled "Are You Ready" and was released on 10 June 2005; it was written and produced by the MadNotes team (who have previously worked with Alicia Keys and Justin Timberlake). The song was promoted well and peaked at number twenty-five on the singles chart. Five months later, the duo released the second and last song from the album, "We Ain't Goin' Down", on 13 November 2005, and it was their lowest charting single, peaking at number fifty. The album was finally released on 5 March 2006 including the two singles but did not chart in the ARIA top 100 albums.

The group disbanded due to Naomi Wenitong joining the group The Last Kinection in 2006.

=== 2021–present: Reunion ===
In October 2021, Wenitong and Stacey reunited as Shakaya for the first time in over 15 years to perform at the Pride Fair Day in their native Cairns. They would later perform as part of Yabun Festival in January 2022, and performed at the Quandamooka Festival on Stradbroke Island in August 2022.

== Discography ==
=== Albums ===
List of albums, with selected details and chart positions
Title	Details	Peak chart positions
Title	Details	AUS
Shakaya	Release date: 18 October 2002; Label: Columbia (5097552000); Formats: CD	5
Are You Ready	Release date: 5 March 2006; Label: Columbia (616052.2); Formats: CD	—

=== Singles ===
List of singles, with selected chart positions and certifications
Title	Year	Chart positions	Certification	Album
Title	Year	AUS	Certification	Album
"Stop Calling Me"	2002	5	ARIA: Platinum	Shakaya
"Sublime"	2002	19		Shakaya
"Cinderella"	2002	16		Shakaya
"The Way You Make Me Feel"	2003	21		Single only
"Are You Ready"	2005	25		Are You Ready
"We Ain't Goin' Down"	2005	50		Are You Ready

== Awards and recognition ==
=== ARIA Awards ===
The ARIA Music Awards is an annual awards ceremony that recognises excellence, innovation, and achievement across all genres of Australian music.

Year	Nominee / work	Award	Result
2002	"Stop Calling Me"	Highest Selling Single	Nominated

=== Deadly Awards ===
The Deadly Awards (commonly known simply as The Deadlys) was an annual celebration of Australian Aboriginal and Torres Strait Islander achievement in music, sport, entertainment and community. They ran from 1996 to 2013.

Year	Nominee / work	Award	Result
2002	themselves	Band of the Year	Won
2002	themselves	Most Promising New Talent	Won
2002	"Stop Calling Me"	Single of the Year	Won
2002	"Sublime"	Video of the Year	Won
2003	Shakaya	Album of the Year	Won
