= Impatient (Anna Abreu song) =

Single by Anna Abreu

from the album Just a Pretty Face?
- Released: 9 November 2009
- Recorded: 2009
- Genre: Pop
- Length: 3:45
- Label: RCA
- Songwriter(s): Rauli Eskolin, Patric Sarin, Anna Abreu
- Producer(s): Rauli Eskolin

Anna Abreu singles chronology
"Music Everywhere" (2009)	"Impatient" (2009)	"Slam" (2010)

Music video
- "Impatient" on YouTube

"Impatient" is a song by Finnish singer Anna Abreu from her third studio album, Just a Pretty Face? (2009). Abreu co-wrote the song with longtime collaborator Rauli Eskolin (known professionally as Rake), and Patric Sarin. Eskolin also produced the song, while Sarin provided additional backing vocals. "Impatient" is a Pop ballad. The song was released on 9 November 2009 in Finland, as the album's second single.

== Lyrical content ==
"Impatient" is a pop ballad that explores the theme of difficult relationships, where one feels emotionally neglected but sticks around because they still have very strong feelings towards their partner. Abreu sings 'you say you listen but you never do' and 'you make me sad when I'm happy'. However, rather than be deluded, she is fully aware of the negativity the relationship is causing, but is unable to break away due to her love for her partner: 'still I go weak when you just look at me'. The song ends with Abreu providing a clear ultimatum: 'let me love...or let me be free'.

== Chart performance ==
Released only to radio in order to promote the album from which it was lifted, "Impatient" did not chart on the Finnish Top 20 or the Download Chart. It did, however, reach number twenty-one on the Airplay Chart.

Chart (2009)	Peak position
Finland (Radio)	21

== Music video ==
The music video for "Impatient" was directed by Mikko Harma, who had previously directed the video for the lead single from Just a Pretty Face?, "Music Everywhere". The video is shot at night in downtown Helsinki, with Abreu (dressed in a glittering black jumpsuit) entering what appears to be her partner's apartment and reminiscing about their relationship. Inside she finds two empty champagne glasses, the bed covered in rose petals and another woman's clothing in the wardrobe, insinuating that her partner has been cheating on her. Abreu tears up the clothes, draws a loveheart on the mirror and takes her jewellery from the bedroom, escaping out of the window just as the man returns. She then makes her way down the street as the song ends.

== Track listing ==
1. "Impatient" – 3:45

== Credits and personnel ==
- Songwriting – Rauli Eskolin, Patric Sarin, Anna Abreu
- Production - Rauli Eskolin
- Engineering - Rauli Eskolin (at Inkfish Studios: Helsinki, Finland)
- Instruments - Rauli Eskolin
- Lead vocals - Anna Abreu
- Backing vocals - Anna Abreu, Patric Sarin
- Mixing - Rauli Eskolin

== Release history ==
Region	Date	Format	Label
Finland	9 November 2009	CD single, Digital download	RCA
