= End of Love (song) =

Single by Anna Abreu

from the album Anna Abreu
- Released: 30 July 2007
- Recorded: 2007
- Genre: Pop, R&B
- Length: 3:42
- Label: RCA
- Songwriter(s): Teemu Brunila
- Producer(s): Rauli Eskolin, Teemu Brunila

Anna Abreu singles chronology
"End of Love" (2007)	"Ivory Tower" (2007)

Music video
- "End of Love" on YouTube

"End of Love" is the debut single of Finnish singer Anna Abreu from her debut studio album, Anna Abreu (2007). Rauli Eskolin (known professionally as Rake) produced the song along with Teemu Brunila; the latter also wrote the song. It is a Pop song with R&B and Latin rhythms. The song was released on 30 July 2007 in Finland, as the album's lead single.

== Lyrical content ==
Lyrically, "End of Love" revolves around the theme of lost love and reminiscence. Abreu sings about a 'boy' who she was once in a relationship, though the reason for the relationship's end is never made clear. Instead, the lyrics focus upon all of the good times that the 'boy' brought, such as teaching Abreu to sing 'love songs', 'swinging under the moon' and 'dancing through the night'. Abreu sings that she wants to have all of these things brought back, though realises that this is likely impossible and that it is 'the end of love'.

== Chart performance ==
"End of Love" debuted and peaked at number eight on the Finnish Top 20 Singles Chart. The song also hit the number one spot on the Finnish Download Chart, becoming Abreu's first number one single. It was one of the most played songs on Finnish radio stations during the summer of 2007.

Chart (2007)	Peak position
Finland (Top 20 Singles)	8
Finland (Digital)	1

== Music video ==
The music video for "End of Love" was directed by Jaakko Manninen and produced by Kusti Manninen. Video was filmed in Sintra, Portugal, where Abreu's father lives and she refers to as her 'second home'. The video features Abreu walking through the surf on the beach in a white dress, blutching her shoes and singing. This is interserpsed with scenes of the 'boy' in the song writing lyrics with Abreu as he plays on a guitar. The video ends with Abreu standing alone on the beach at sunset, looking out to sea.

== Live performances ==
Abreu performed the song at the 2008 Emma Awards, during which she was nominated for five awards, including Song of the Year for "End of Love". It has since become one of Abreu's most popular songs to be performed live. To date, it is her second most-performed song when she is on tour, having been performed in at least one show during all of her tours.

== Track listing ==
1. "End of Love" – 3:42

== Credits and personnel ==
- Songwriting – Teemu Brunila
- Production - Rauli Eskolin, Teemu Brunila
- Engineering - Rauli Eskolin, Teemu Brunila (at Inkfish Studios: Helsinki, Finland)
- Instruments - Luis Herrero (accordion and bass), Teemu Brunila (all other instruments)
- Lead vocals - Anna Abreu
- Backing vocals - Anna Abreu, Rauli Eskolin
- Mixing - Rauli Eskolin

== Release history ==
Region	Date	Format	Label
Finland	30 July 2007	CD single, Digital download	RCA
