= Rush (Anna Abreu album) =

Studio album by Anna Abreu
- Released: March 30, 2011
- Recorded: June–December 2010
- Genre: Pop, dance, electropop, synthpop
- Label: RCA
- Producer: Jukka Immonen

Anna Abreu chronology
Just a Pretty Face? (2009)	Rush (2011)	Greatest Hits (2012)

Singles from Rush
- 1. "Hysteria" Released: January 10, 2011; 2. "Worst Part Is Over" Released: April 25, 2011; 3. "Stereo" Released: August 25, 2011; 4. "Be With You" Released: November 23, 2011

Rush is the fourth studio album by Finnish singer Anna Abreu, released in Finland by RCA on March 30, 2011. The album was preceded by the lead single "Hysteria" in January 2011.

The album was produced by Jukka Immonen, who is known for his work with Finnish singer Jenni Vartiainen. Principal photography for the album, including its cover and those of its lead single "Hysteria", was completed in Thailand in December 2010.

== Commercial performance ==
Rush debuted at number one on the Finnish Top 50 albums chart, becoming Abreu's third number one album and holding the top spot for one week. To date it has sold over 10,000 copies and has been certified gold by the IFPI.

=== Chart performance ===
Chart	Peak position	Certification	Sales
Finnish Albums Chart	1	Gold	14,038

== Singles ==
- "Hysteria", the lead single from the album, was written by Patric Sarin, the songwriter-producer who worked with Abreu through the recording of her two previous albums Now and Just a Pretty Face?. Released on January 10, 2011, "Hysteria" debuted and peaked at number 6 on the Finnish singles chart, becoming Abreu's fifth top ten hit on the chart.
- "Worst Part is Over", featuring Finnish rapper Redrama was released as the second single from the album on April 25, 2011. The song reached number twelve on the Radio Airplay chart.
- "Stereo", the third single from the album, was released on August 25, 2011 and accompanied by a music video. The song was extremely popular with radio stations and reached number two on the Airplay Chart.
- "Be With You" was released on November 23, 2011 as the final single from the album. It was released solely for promotional purposes.

== Track listing ==
No.	Title	Writer(s)	Producer(s)	Length
1.	"Hysteria"	Patric Sarin	Jukka Immonen	4:07
2.	"Worst Part Is Over (feat. Redrama)"	Redrama, Anna Abreu, Jukka Immonen	Jukka Immonen	3:38
3.	"Stereo"	Bryn Christopher, Immonen, Ali Tennant	Jukka Immonen	4:05
4.	"Broken Kind Of Good Love"	Sarin	Jukka Immonen	3:33
5.	"Send You Packing"	Redrama, Hermanni Kovalainen	Jukka Immonen, DJ Mobster	3:11
6.	"Mend"	Iain James, Hiten Bharadia	Jukka Immonen	4:34
7.	"This Girl"	Sarin	Jukka Immonen	3:13
8.	"Other Side"	Abrue, Redrama, Richard Murto	Jukka Immonen, Richard Murto, Lasse Piirainen	3:57
9.	"Dynamite"	Virginia Blackmore, Immonen	Jukka Immonen	3:56
10.	"Be With You"	Jussi Nikula, Erik Nyholm, Antti Riihimaki	Jukka Immonen, Jussi Nikula	3:31
Total length:				37:48

== Promotion ==
Rush Tour
- Tour by Anna Abreu
- Associated album: Rush
- Start date: March 18, 2011
- End date: October 20, 2011
- Legs: 1
- No. of shows: 9 in Finland

Anna Abreu concert chronology
- Just a Pretty Face? Tour (2009-2010); Rush Tour (2011); Over and Out Tour (2012)

In 2011, Abreu promoted her fourth album with the Rush Tour throughout Finland.

=== Setlist ===
Finland
1. "Hysteria"
2. "Stereo"
3. "This Girl"
4. "Liquid" (performed at selected venues)
5. "Slam" (performed at selected venues)
6. "Impatient" (performed at selected venues)
7. "Be With You"
8. "Other Side" (performed at selected venues)
9. "Mend"
10. "Vinegar"
11. "Dynamite"
12. "Worst Part Is Over"
13. "Way You See It" (Redrama cover) (performed at selected venues)
14. "Ivory Tower" (performed at selected venues)
15. "Send You Packing"
16. "End of Love" (performed at selected venues)
17. "Music Everywhere"

=== Tour dates ===
Date	City	Country	Venue
March 18, 2011	Helsinki	Finland	The Voice Liveklub
April 8, 2011	Helsinki	Finland	Virgin Oil Co.
April 15, 2011	Jyväskylä	Finland	Paviljonki
May 15, 2011	Utti	Finland	Monitoimihalli
July 2, 2011	Helsinki	Finland	The Circus
August 19, 2011	Järvenpää	Finland	Järvenpäätalo
September 3, 2011	Hyvinkää	Finland	Summeri
October 8, 2011	Joensuu	Finland	Kerubi
October 20, 2011	Helsinki	Finland	Tavastia
