= Are You Ready (Shakaya song) =

2005 single by Shakaya

Single by Shakaya featuring Nate Wade

from the album Are You Ready
- B-side: "Say Ho"
- Released: 13 June 2005
- Length: 3:24
- Label: Columbia
- Songwriters: Daniel O'Donoghue; Ruth-Anne Cunningham
- Producers: Mark Sheehan; Alex Greggs; Daniel O'Donoghue

Shakaya singles chronology
"The Way You Make Me Feel" (2003)	"Are You Ready" (2005)	"We Ain't Goin' Down" (2005)

Audio video
- "Are You Ready" on YouTube

"Are You Ready" is a song written by Danny O'Donoghue and Ruth-Anne Cunningham, also known as the MadNotes production team, and performed by the Australian musical duo Shakaya. The song features a rap verse from Nate Wade. Produced by Mark Sheehan, Alex Greggs, and Daniel O'Donoghue, "Are You Ready" was released as the lead single from Shakaya's second album, Are You Ready, on 13 June 2005. The song debuted at number 25 in Australia, stayed there for two weeks, and left the chart two weeks later.

== Track listing ==
Australian CD single

1. "Are You Ready" (featuring Nate Wade)
2. "Say Ho"
3. "Are You Ready" (without rap)

== Charts ==
Chart (2005)	Peak position
Australia (ARIA)	25
Australian Urban (ARIA)	13

== Anna Abreu version ==
"Are You Ready"

Single by Anna Abreu

from the album Anna Abreu
- Released: 22 January 2008
- Length: 3:13
- Label: RCA; Sony BMG
- Songwriters: Daniel O'Donoghue; Ruth-Anne Cunningham

Anna Abreu singles chronology
"Ivory Tower" (2007)	"Are You Ready" (2008)	"Vinegar" (2008)

In 2007, Finnish Idols runner-up Anna Abreu covered the song for her self-titled debut album. In January 2008, the song was confirmed to be the third single from the album, after "End of Love" and "Ivory Tower". The digital release followed on 22 January 2008. The official remix was digitally released a month after, on 25 February 2008.

=== Track listings ===
Digital release

1. "Are You Ready" – 3:13

Remixes single

1. "Are You Ready" (2008 Remix radio edit) – 3:22
2. "Are You Ready" (2008 Remix extended) – 4:12
