= Anna Abreu (album) =

Studio album by Anna Abreu
- Released: August 22, 2007
- Recorded: April–June 2007
- Genres: Pop, R&B
- Length: 37:58
- Label: RCA
- Producers: Rauli Eskolin, Teema Brunila

Anna Abreu chronology
| Anna Abreu (2007) | Now (2008) |

Singles from Anna Abreu
- 1. "End of Love" Released: July 30, 2007; 2. "Ivory Tower" Released: October 15, 2007; 3. "Are You Ready" Released: January 21, 2008

Anna Abreu is the self-titled debut album by Finnish singer and season three Idols runner-up Anna Abreu, released in Finland by RCA on August 22, 2007. "End of Love" was released as the album's lead single, followed by "Ivory Tower", and "Are You Ready" (a cover of the 2005 hit by Australian duo Shakaya).

The album debuted at number one on the Finnish albums chart and was certified platinum within its first week after selling close to 30,000 copies. The album remained on the chart for a staggering thirty-seven weeks, thirteen of which were spent within the top five. To date it has sold over 86,000 copies, is certified double platinum and ranked as the fortieth best-performing album of all time in Finland. To date it is the highest selling album by an Idols alumnus.

== Commercial performance ==
Anna Abreu debuted at number one on the Finnish Top 40 albums chart, selling almost 30,000 copies in its first week, enough to be certified platinum. To date it holds the record for the highest sales in one week by any Idols contestant. It dropped to number two in its second week, but continued to stay in the top five for its first ten weeks. In its thirty-third week on the chart, the album suddenly rose from number eighteen to seven after selling almost 4000 copies. In total it spent thirty-seven weeks on the official Top 40 chart. In December 2007, Anna Abreu was certified double platinum and to date has sold over 86,000 copies.

=== Chart performance ===
| Chart | Peak position | Certification | Sales |
|---|---|---|---|
| Finnish Top 40 Albums | 1 | 2× Platinum | 86,170 |

== Singles ==
- "End of Love", the first single from the album debuted and peaked at number eight on the Finnish singles chart. It remained on the chart for three weeks, however it also reached number one on the digital chart and its popularity continued for many months, allowing it to gain gold certification for the sale of over 5,000 copies.
- "Ivory Tower" was released as the second single and would prove to be the most successful. It peaked at number five on the official singles chart and the number two spot of the digital list. It remained on the official chart for ten weeks and was certified gold for the sale of 5,000 copies.
- "Are You Ready", the third and final single from the album was released for promotional purposes only, and as such did appear on the official singles chart. It did however, manage a peak of number seventeen on the digital list.

== Track listing ==
| No. | Title | Writer(s) | Producer(s) | Length |
|---|---|---|---|---|
| 1. | "Are You Ready" | Ruth-Anne Cunningham, Daniel John O'Donoghue | Rauli Eskolin | 3:13 |
| 2. | "Ivory Tower" | Rauli Eskolin | Rauli Eskolin | 3:46 |
| 3. | "Shame" | Kristina Wheeler, Tiia Rantanen | Rauli Eskolin | 3:25 |
| 4. | "Solta-se O Beijo" | Catarina Furtado, Joao Lopes | Rauli Eskolin | 4:14 |
| 5. | "How Could You Do It" | Rauli Eskolin | Rauli Eskolin | 3:27 |
| 6. | "Unsatisfiable" | Tina Parol, Boots Ottestad, Edie Kuhnle | Rauli Eskolin | 2:50 |
| 7. | "Contigo Corazón" | Alex Ojasti | Rauli Eskolin | 3:20 |
| 8. | "End of Love" | Teema Brunila | Rauli Eskolin, Teema Brunila | 3:42 |
| 9. | "Bad Girl" | Patric Sarin | Rauli Eskolin | 3:24 |
| 10. | "Stressed Out" | Jorgen Elofsson, Maki Kolehmainen, Tracy Lipp | Rauli Eskolin | 3:19 |
| 11. | "Everywhere I Go" | Nathan Brent Bennett, Steven Stewart | Rauli Eskolin | 3:17 |
| Total length: | | | | 37:58 |

== Promotion ==
Anna Abreu Live Tour
- Tour by Anna Abreu
- Associated album: Anna Abreu
- Start date: September 8, 2007
- End date: September 13, 2008
- Legs: 1
- No. of shows: 11 in Finland

Anna Abreu concert chronology
- Anna Abreu Live Tour (2007-2008); Now Tour (2008-2009)

From 2007 to 2008, Abreu promoted her debut album with the Anna Abreu Live Tour throughout Finland.

=== Setlist ===
Finland
1. "Are You Ready"
2. "Ivory Tower"
3. "Everywhere I Go" (performed at selected venues)
4. "Shame"
5. "Unsatisfiable"
6. "Contigo Corazon"
7. "How Could You Do It"
8. "End of Love"
9. "Stressed Out"
10. "Bad Girl"
11. "Nothing Compares 2 U" (Sinéad O'Connor cover) (performed at selected venues)
12. "Solta-se O Beijo"

=== Tour dates ===
| Date | City | Country | Venue |
|---|---|---|---|
| September 8, 2007 | Pieksämäki | Finland | Hotelli Savonsolmu |
| November 25, 2007 | Tampere | Finland | Tullintori |
| January 3, 2008 | Ylivieska | Finland | Akustiikka |
| February 21, 2008 | Nilsiä | Finland | Piazza Tahko |
| February 27, 2008 | Turku | Finland | M/S Silja Europa |
| March 1, 2008 | Kauniainen | Finland | Paviljonki |
| April 19, 2008 | Sotkamo | Finland | Vuokatti |
| June 7, 2008 | Iisalmi | Finland | Liikuntahalli |
| June 12, 2008 | Helsinki | Finland | Kaisaniemi |
| July 19, 2008 | Hämeenlinna | Finland | Linnan Puisto |
| September 13, 2008 | Lempäälä | Finland | Ideapark |
