= The Last Kinection =

Australian Indigenous hip-hop group

- Origin: Newcastle, New South Wales, Australia
- Genres: Hip-hop
- Years active: 2006–present
- Labels: BlackChili Productions
- Members: Joel Wenitong; Naomi Wenitong; Jacob Turier
- Website: myspace.com/thelastkinection

The Last Kinection are an Indigenous hip-hop trio from Newcastle, New South Wales. The group was formed in 2006 by Joel Wenitong, DJ Jay Tee (both from Local Knowledge) and Naomi Wenitong (Shakaya). The Last Kinection first came to attention with its reworking of the Peter Allen song, "I Still Call Australia Home".

== History ==
=== Elefant Tracks ===
In June 2010, The Last Kinection was officially signed to independent Sydney record label Elefant Traks who released the band's second album, Next of Kin, in 2011.

=== Touring ===
In 2009, the band supported Public Enemy. They followed this up with a national tour beginning in July.

=== Accident ===
In September 2008, the group were involved in a car accident with Wenitong and DJ Jay Tee receiving serious injuries. Wenitong sustained a broken femur, jaw, wrist, ribs, fractured pelvis, head injuries and was left in a coma. The accident was featured in an episode of the Crash Investigation Unit TV series.

== Awards ==
The band has won Deadly Awards in 2009 and 2010 for outstanding achievement in R 'n' B and hip hop and in 2011 for Best Band and Best Single. In 2012, The Last Kinection received the Deadly award for "Best Band of the Year".

== Discography ==
- Nutches (2008) – BlackChili Productions
- Next of Kin (2011) – Elefant Traks
