= Now (Anna Abreu album) =

Studio album by Anna Abreu
- Released: October 22, 2008
- Recorded: July – August 2008
- Genre: Pop, R&B, dance
- Length: 37:06
- Label: RCA
- Producer: Rauli Eskolin

Anna Abreu chronology
| Anna Abreu (2007) | Now (2008) | Just A Pretty Face? (2009) |

Singles from Now
- 1. "Vinegar" Released: August 6, 2008; 2. "Silent Despair" Released: October 6, 2008; 3. "Something About U" Released: January 26, 2009; 4. "Come Undone" Released: April 20, 2009

Now is the second studio album by Finnish singer Anna Abreu, released in Finland by RCA on October 22, 2008. The album was preceded by the singles "Vinegar" and "Silent Despair" and followed by the release of third and fourth singles "Something About U" and "Come Undone".

The album marked a change of artistic direction for Abreu, featuring several dance-infused songs such as the smash hit "Vinegar" and "Something About U". It spent two consecutive weeks at number one on the Finnish albums chart and was certified platinum for Finnish sales in excess of 30,000 copies. The album spent eighteen weeks on the albums chart and has to date sold over 50,000 copies. It is ranked as the best-selling album of 2008 in Finland.

== Commercial performance ==
Now debuted at number two on the Finnish Top 40 albums chart, selling just under 7000 copies in its first week, considerably less than her debut, which sold almost 30,000 and was certified platinum in its first week alone. In its seventh week however, the album rose up to the top spot, becoming Abreu's second number one album. It held the number one position for two consecutive weeks, gaining further sales of 20,000 copies. In total Now spent eighteen weeks on the official Top 40 chart and was certified platinum, with sales to date recorded at 50,695.

=== Chart performance ===
| Chart | Peak position | Certification | Sales |
|---|---|---|---|
| Finnish Albums Chart | 1 | Platinum | 50,695 |

== Singles ==
- "Vinegar", the lead single from the album initially debuted at number five on the Finnish singles chart. However, it rose to number one in its third week, a position it held for three non-consecutive weeks. In total it spent nineteen weeks on the chart (thirteen of which were in the top five) and is to date Abreu's most successful single. It is ranked as the eighty-eighth best-selling single in Finnish chart history and was certified platinum for sales of over 10,000 copies.
- "Silent Despair" was released as the second single and it too preceded the album. It received a limited physical release and as a result did not chart on the official singles list. However it did reach number twenty-five on the digital chart and like its predecessor, was accompanied by a music video. It garnered strong radio airplay and reached number two on the Airplay Chart.
- "Something About U", the third single from the album was released only to promote the album and did not appear on either the singles or digital charts, although it did garner radio airplay.
- "Come Undone", the fourth and final single from the album was also released only for promotional purposes.

== Track listing ==
| No. | Title | Writer(s) | Producer(s) | Length |
|---|---|---|---|---|
| 1. | "Vinegar" | Patric Sarin, Rauli Eskolin | Rauli Eskolin | 3:41 |
| 2. | "You Don't Get Me" | Sarin, Eskolin, Eva Peijakas | Rauli Eskolin | 3:21 |
| 3. | "Something About U" | Mats Valentin, Johan 'Jones' Wetterberg, Per Eklund | Rauli Eskolin | 3:56 |
| 4. | "Silent Despair" | Sarin, Eskolin, Anna Abreu | Rauli Eskolin | 3:57 |
| 5. | "Done With Her" | Sarin, Eskolin | Rauli Eskolin | 3:35 |
| 6. | "Perdoa-Me" | Abreu, Eskolin, Sarin | Rauli Eskolin | 3:59 |
| 7. | "Junkie For Your Love" | Pat Bernetti, Axl Johanssen, Tracy Lipp | Rauli Eskolin | 3:17 |
| 8. | "Come Undone" | Eskolin | Rauli Eskolin | 4:01 |
| 9. | "No Estragues El Momento" | Abreu, Eskolin, Sarin | Rauli Eskolin | 3:33 |
| 10. | "Walking On Water" | Erno Laitinen | Rauli Eskolin | 3:39 |
| Total length: | | | | 37:06 |

Digital Bonus Content
| No. | Title | Writer(s) | Producer(s) | Length |
|---|---|---|---|---|
| 11. | "Work It Out" | Eskolin, Sarin | Rauli Eskolin | 3:04 |
| 12. | "Vinegar (Umeboshi Mix)" | Sarin, Eskolin | Rauli Eskolin | 5:16 |

== Promotion ==
Now Tour
- Tour by Anna Abreu
- Associated album: Now
- Start date: December 2, 2008
- End date: July 18, 2009
- Legs: 1
- No. of shows: 10 in Finland

Anna Abreu concert chronology
- Anna Abreu Live Tour (2007-2008); Now Tour (2008-2009); Just a Pretty Face? Tour (2009-2010)

From 2008 to 2009, Abreu promoted her sophomore album with the Now Tour throughout Finland.

=== Setlist ===
Finland
1. "You Don't Get Me" (performed at selected venues)
2. "Are You Ready"
3. "Walking On Water" (performed at selected venues)
4. "Something About You" (performed at selected venues)
5. "Ivory Tower"
6. "Work It Out"
7. "Bad Girl"
8. "Perdoa-Me" (performed at selected venues)
9. "Come Undone"
10. "Silent Despair"
11. "Contigo Corazon"
12. "No Estragues El Momento"
13. "How Could You Do It"
14. "Solta-se O Beijo" (performed at selected venues)
15. "Everywhere I Go" (performed at selected venues)
16. "End of Love" (performed at selected venues)
17. "Vinegar"

=== Tour dates ===
| Date | City | Country | Venue |
|---|---|---|---|
| December 2, 2008 | Lahti | Finland | Sibeliustal |
| December 7, 2008 | Kerava | Finland | Kerava-sali |
| February 13, 2009 | Jämsä | Finland | Himos Areena |
| February 27, 2009 | Turku | Finland | M/S Viking Isabella |
| March 4, 2009 | Espoo | Finland | Tapiola |
| May 15, 2009 | Joensuu | Finland | Sokos Hotel Kimmel |
| May 30, 2009 | Pori | Finland | Karhuhalli |
| May 31, 2009 | Pori | Finland | Karhuhalli |
| June 13, 2009 | Vantaa | Finland | Hakunilan Urheilupuisto |
| July 18, 2009 | Tornio | Finland | Umpitunneli |
