= Anna Abreu =

Finnish singer

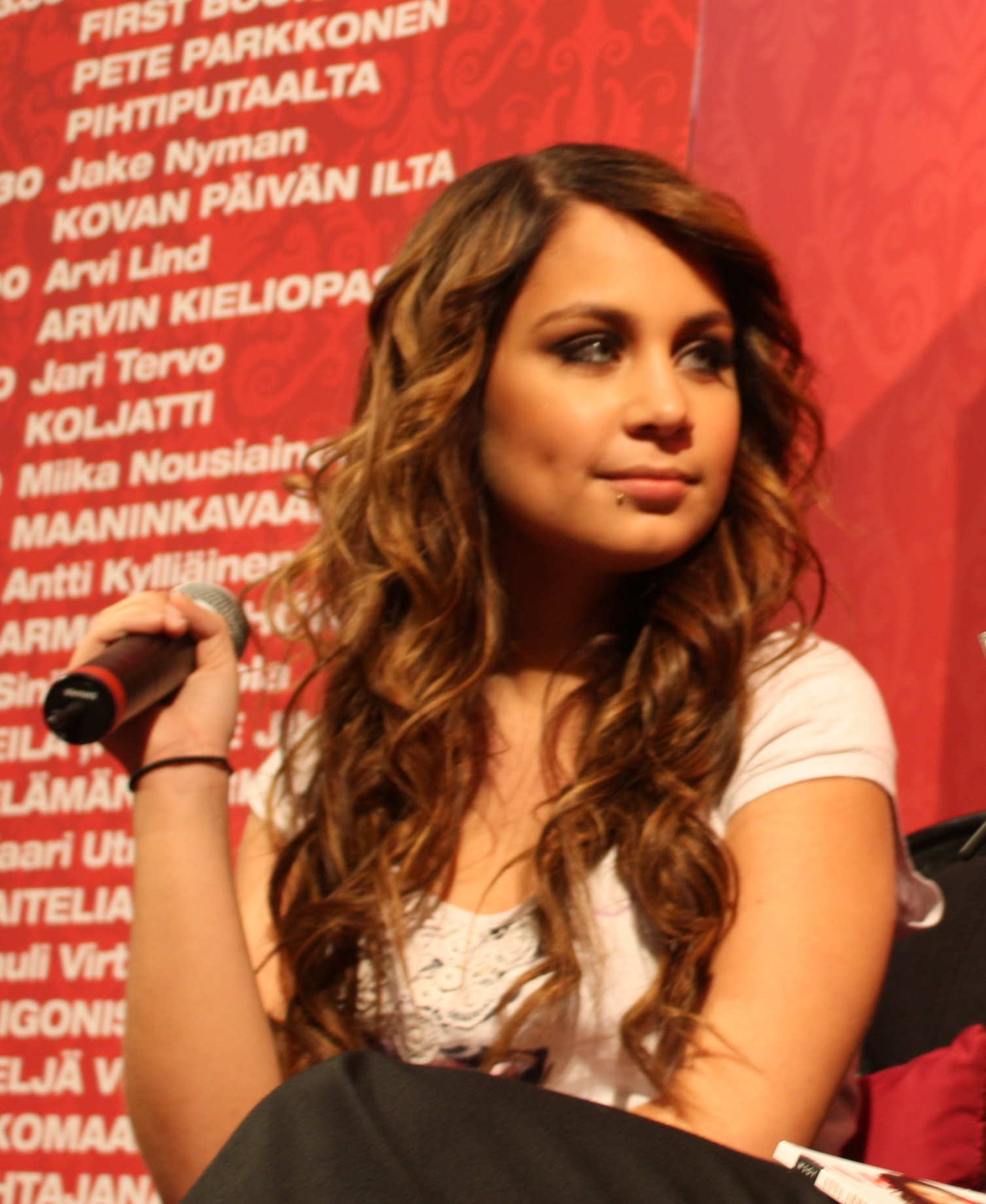
- Abreu in 2009

Background information
- Born: Anna Eira Margarida Mourão de Melo e Abreu; 7 February 1990 (age 36); Helsinki, Finland
- Genres: Pop; R&B; dance
- Occupation: Singer
- Years active: 2006–present
- Labels: Warner Bros.; RCA
- Website: anna-abreu.fi

Anna Eira Margarida Heiskari (née Mourão de Melo e Abreu; born 7 February 1990), known professionally as simply ABREU since 2017, is a Finnish singer and songwriter. Abreu first rose to fame in Finland after placing as the runner-up in the third series of the Finnish singing talent show Idols in 2007. Her music has been described as pop with influences from genres such as R&B, dance, and Latin. Since her participation in Idols, Abreu has become one of the best-selling former Idols contestants in Finland, and one of the most successful Finnish female singers. She has certified record sales surpassing 190,000 copies, which places her also among the 100 best-selling music artists of all time in Finland.

== Early life ==
Abreu was born in Helsinki to a Portuguese father, Paulo Mourão de Melo e Abreu, and a Finnish mother, Liisa. She has an elder brother named Emil. As a young child, Abreu spent some time residing in Portugal, and speaks fluent Portuguese, Spanish, and English in addition to Finnish. Her parents later separated, with her father now residing in Sintra, Portugal.

== Career ==
=== 2006–2007: Idols Series 3 ===
In the summer of 2006, Abreu auditioned for the third season of the singing competition Finnish Pop Idol in the Finnish capital, Helsinki. She sang the Alicia Keys hit "Fallin'" and "Jumala" by Finnish rock band Apulanta. The contest's four judges were all impressed by the power and conviction of her voice, especially as Abreu was only sixteen years old. She passed through to the theatre rounds of the contest and then the live finals. Abreu's performances attracted heavy public support, however, during the top 5 results show, she landed in the bottom two contestants alongside Panu Larnos. Abreu survived the elimination and made it through to the live grand finale at Helsinki Ice Hall with fellow contestant Ari Koivunen, who sang exclusively in the heavy-metal genre. On 5 April 2007, Koivunen won the crown as the third Finnish Idol with 57% of the public vote, with Abreu declared as runner-up.

Idols season 3 performances and results
Week no.	Song choice	Original artist	Result
Audition (Helsinki)	"Fallin" "Jumala"	Alicia Keys; Apulanta	Advanced
Theatre Round	"Oon voimissain" "Get the Party Started"	Vicky Rosti; Pink	Advanced
Semi-finals	"Broken"	Seether featuring Amy Lee	Advanced
Top 7	"Nothing Compares 2 U"	Sinéad O'Connor	Safe
Top 6	"A Woman's Worth"	Alicia Keys	Safe
Top 5	"The First Cut Is the Deepest"	Sheryl Crow	Bottom 2
Top 4	"A Dios le Pido" "Jumala"	Juanes; Apulanta	Safe
Top 3	"Vahva" "Rakkauden haudalla"	Irina; Juice Leskinen	Safe
Top 2	"Fallin'" "I Love Rock 'n' Roll" "Solta-se O Beijo" "On the Top of the World"	Alicia Keys; Joan Jett; Ala dos Namorados; Ari Koivunen	Runner-Up

=== 2007–2008: Anna Abreu ===
Following her participation in Idols, Abreu was signed to Sony BMG Finland and her Latino-inspired, debut single "End of Love" was released in July 2007. The song debuted and peaked at number eight on the singles chart and was accompanied by Abreu's first music video. Her self-titled debut album, Anna Abreu, was released a month later on 22 August and was certified platinum within its first week after going straight into the chart at number one and selling 30,000 copies. To date, its first week sales are among the highest in Finnish music history. The album's second single "Ivory Tower" was released in October 2007, and after initially debuting at number seventeen, the song peaked at number five in its seventh week. A third single "Are You Ready" was released for promotional purposes only. In March 2008, Anna Abreu was certified double-platinum having sold over 86,000 copies. In the same month at the MTV Europe Music Awards, Abreu was nominated for Best Finnish Act.

=== 2008–2009: Now ===
After a sell-out tour across Finland to promote her debut album, Abreu returned to the recording studio to work on her second album. On 31 July 2008, the lead single "Vinegar" was released. Produced by Patric Sarin and Rauli Eskolin, the dance-oriented song marked a creative step away from the pop and RnB roots of Abreu's debut album. The song hit the number one spot on the Finnish charts and stayed there, not only becoming Abreu's first number one single but also one of the highest-selling singles of 2008. The second single, "Silent Despair", was released in early October, followed by the album Now on 22 October. The album became Abreu's second number one album and was certified platinum, selling over 50,000 copies. It was the highest selling album of 2008 in Finland and spawned two further singles with "Something About U" and "Come Undone", though the songs were used only for promotional purposes. In early 2009, Abreu supported Now with a cross-country tour, which like her first tour, played to sold-out venues.

It was reported that Abreu earned over 145,000 euros in 2008 through a combination of album sales, touring and public appearances, making her one of Finland's highest-earning singers.

=== 2009–2010: Just a Pretty Face? ===
In August 2009, less than a year after the release of Abreu's second album, her record label Sony BMG announced that Abreu would release her third studio album later that year. The lead single "Music Everywhere" received its radio premiere on 5 August and was released five days later. After initially debuting at number four, the single rose to its peak of number two after Abreu's televised performance on the Finnish Children In Need, narrowly missing out on becoming Abreu's second number one single. Like "Vinegar" from her previous album, the single was dance-oriented, with Abreu stating that her new album would be almost completely dance and club based.

In September 2009 it was announced that Abreu and fellow Idols contestant Antti Tuisku would be embarking on a joint tour across Finland named the Pop Royalty Tour in 2010 to support their new albums. Tickets for the dates sold out within a matter of minutes and further tour dates had to be added to accommodate the huge public demand. At the same time, Abreu's record label announced that a remixed version of "Vinegar", the lead single from Abreu's second album, would be released as her debut single in the UK on 22 November. It went on to peak at number 7 on the UK Club Chart. On 21 October, almost exactly one year after the release of her second album, Abreu released her third, Just A Pretty Face? in Finland. After only one day, the album was certified gold, having sold 23,000 copies in its first day of release alone. It peaked at number two on the Finnish albums chart and has since become Abreu's third consecutive platinum album. It was the sixth highest-selling album of 2009, despite only being released in October.

On 11 April 2010, Abreu performed her new promotional single "Slam" on the first series of the Finnish X Factor, which had replaced Idols, the show that had given Abreu the platform from which to launch her music career in 2007.

=== 2010–2012: Rush ===
In late August 2010, Abreu announced via her official Facebook page that she had begun work on her fourth album, Rush. Abreu stated that she hoped to include a collaboration on the new album, and asked fans whom they would like to hear her duet with. The first single, "Hysteria", was released on 10 January 2011. Her fourth studio album was released on 30 March 2011 and entered the chart at number 1, becoming Abreu's third chart-topping album. The album's second single was "Worst Part Is Over", featuring Swedish-speaking Finnish rapper Redrama.

=== 2012–present: Greatest Hits and break from music ===
In 2011, Abreu announced that she would release a Greatest Hits album before taking a break from music.

== Personal life ==
Abreu dated her fellow former Idols contestant Panu Larnos from 2007 but the relationship ended in the spring of 2009. In September of that year, she made her relationship with former model Joonas Wörlin public. The couple moved in together in November 2010 but split the following spring. In 2011, Abreu started dating Finnish professional snowboarder Lauri Heiskari and the couple became engaged in July 2012, marrying on 20 June 2013. Although Abreu officially took Heiskari as her surname, she continued to be known by her maiden name for subsequent music releases. Abreu is Catholic.

== Discography ==
- Anna Abreu (2007)
- Now (2008)
- Just a Pretty Face? (2009)
- Rush (2011)
- Greatest Hits (2012)
- V (2014)
- Sensuroimaton versio (2016)
- Teipillä tai rakkaudella (2019)
- Traagista mut maagista (2025)

== Tours ==
Headlining

- Anna Abreu Live Tour (2007–2008)
- Now Tour (2008–2009)
- Just A Pretty Face? Tour (2009–2010)
- Pop Royalty Tour (co-headlining with Antti Tuisku) (2010)
- Rush Tour (2011)
- Over and Out Tour (2012)
- V Tour (2014)

As supporting act

- Enrique Iglesias - Euphoria Tour (2011) Finland, 6–7 April

== Awards and nominations ==
=== Emma Awards ===
Year	Nominee / work	Award	Result
2008	Anna Abreu	Emma Award for Female Soloist of the Year	Won
2008	Anna Abreu	Emma Award for Domestic Artist of the Year	Nominated
2008	Anna Abreu	Emma Award for Debut Album of the Year	Nominated
2008	Anna Abreu	Emma Award for Pop Album of the Year	Nominated
2008	"End of Love"	Emma Award for Song of the Year	Nominated
2009	Anna Abreu	Emma Award for Female Soloist of the Year	Won
2009	Anna Abreu	Emma Award for Domestic Artist of the Year	Won
2009	Now	Emma Award for Album of the Year	Nominated
2009	Now	Emma Award for Pop Album of the Year	Nominated
2009	"Vinegar"	Emma Award for Song of the Year	Nominated
2010	Anna Abreu	Emma Award for Female Soloist of the Year	Nominated
2010	Anna Abreu	Emma Award for Domestic Artist of the Year	Nominated

=== MTV Europe Music Awards ===
Year	Nominee / work	Award	Result
2008	Anna Abreu	MTV Europe Music Award for Best Finnish Act	Nominated
2011	Anna Abreu	MTV Europe Music Award for Best Finnish Act	Nominated

== See also ==
- List of best-selling music artists in Finland
