= Sunrise Avenue discography =

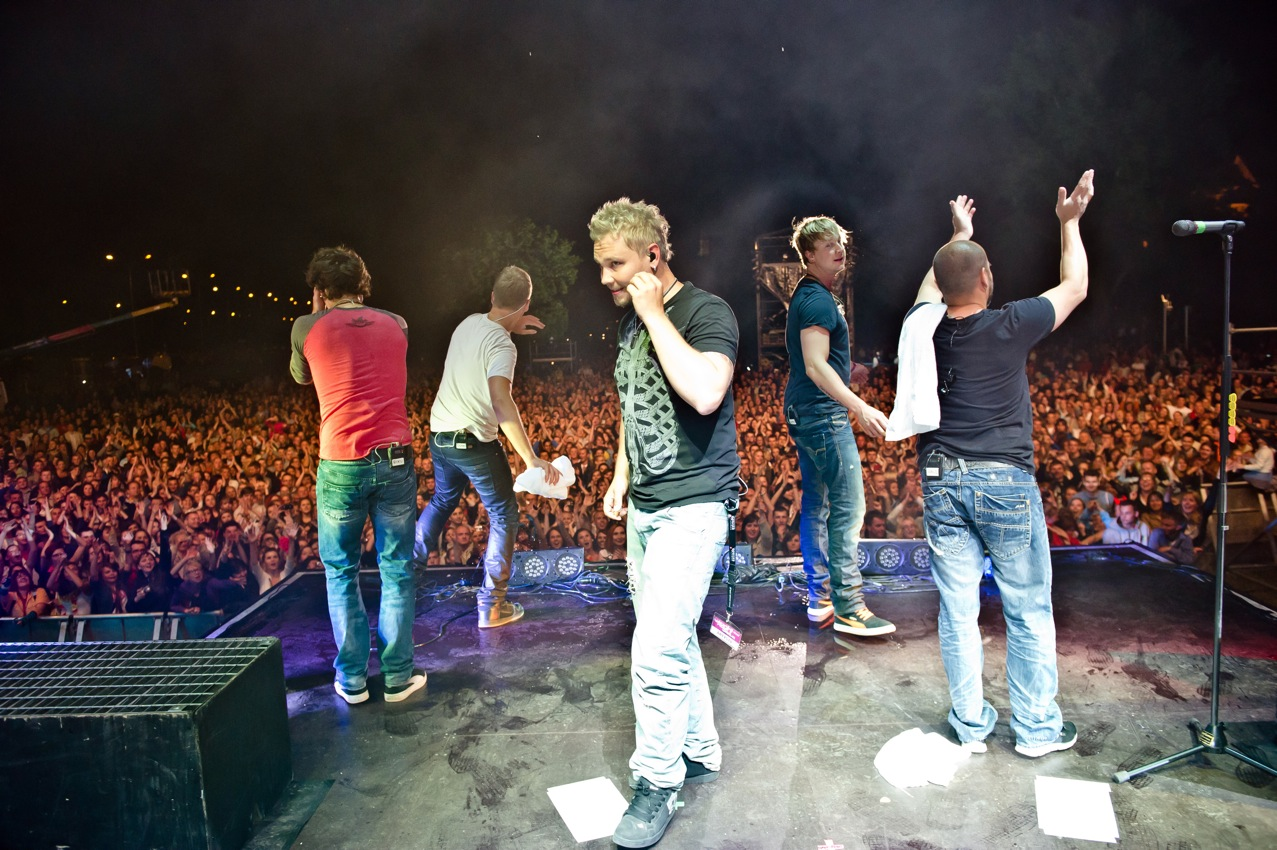
- Sunrise Avenue performing in Warsaw in 2011
- Studio albums: 5
- Extended plays: 2
- Live albums: 4
- Compilation albums: 2
- Singles: 27
- Promotional singles: 2
- Video albums: 3
- Music videos: 22

The following is the full discography of Sunrise Avenue, a Finnish rock band originally formed in 1992 as "Sunrise". The band changed its name to "Sunrise Avenue" in October 2001. They have released five studio albums, four live albums, three live DVDs, two compilation albums, two extended plays, twenty-seven singles, two promotional singles and twenty-two music videos.

== Albums ==
=== Independent albums ===
List of demo albums
Title	Details
Demo	Released: September 2004; Label: Honest Productions

=== Studio albums ===
List of studio albums, with selected chart positions and certifications
Title	Details	Peak chart positions							Certifications
Title	Details	FIN	AUT	GER	GRE	ITA	SWE	SWI	Certifications
On the Way to Wonderland	Released: 25 August 2006; Label: Bonnier Amigo, Capitol (EMI)	2	5	12	1	69	10	15	FIN: Platinum; AUT: Gold; GER: Platinum; GRE: Gold; SWI: Gold
Popgasm	Released: 6 May 2009; Label: Bonnier Amigo, Capitol (EMI)	5	13	16	—	—	—	7	
Out of Style	Released: 25 March 2011; Label: Universal, Capitol (EMI)	2	6	6	—	—	—	8	FIN: Gold; GER: 3× Gold
Unholy Ground	Released: 18 October 2013; Label: Universal, Polydor	10	4	3	—	—	—	4	AUT: Gold; GER: 3× Gold; SWI: Gold
Heartbreak Century	Released: 6 October 2017; Label: Universal, Polydor	4	2	1	—	—	—	2	AUT: Gold; GER: Gold; SWI: Gold
"—" denotes a recording that did not chart or was not released in that territory.

=== Live albums ===
List of live albums, with selected chart positions
Title	Details	Peak chart positions			
Title	Details	FIN	AUT	GER	SWI
Acoustic Tour 2010	Released: 2 June 2010; Label: Bonnier Amigo, Capitol (EMI)	5	—	—	—
Out of Style – Live Edition	Released: 4 April 2012; Label: Capitol (EMI)	—	39	—	—
Fairytales: Best of 2006–2014 (Orchestral Version / Live) (featuring 21st Century Orchestra)	Released: 20 February 2015; Label: Universal, Polydor	—	—	—	—
Live with Wonderland Orchestra	Released: 9 April 2021; Label: Universal, Polydor	—	15	3	23
"—" denotes a recording that did not chart or was not released in that territory.

=== Compilation albums ===
List of compilation albums, with selected chart positions and certifications
Title	Details	Peak chart positions				Certifications
Title	Details	FIN	AUT	GER	SWI	Certifications
Fairytales – Best of 2006–2014	Released: 3 October 2014; Label: Universal, Polydor	12	4	1	1	AUT: Platinum; GER: 2× Platinum; SWI: Gold
The Very Best of	Released: 16 October 2020; Label: Universal, Polydor	—	17	8	37	
"—" denotes a recording that did not chart or was not released in that territory.

== Extended plays ==
List of extended plays
Title	Details
iTunes Live: Berlin Festival	Released: 4 June 2008; Label: Bonnier Amigo, Capitol (EMI)
Happiness	Released: 14 October 2009; Label: Bonnier Amigo, Capitol (EMI)

== Singles ==
List of singles, with selected chart positions and certifications, showing year released and album name
Title	Year	Peak chart positions									Certifications	Album
Title	Year	FIN Singles	FIN Download	FIN Radio	GER Singles	GER Radio	AUT	SWI	SWE	BEL	Certifications	Album
"All Because of You"	2006	11	—	—	—	—	—	—	—	—		On the Way to Wonderland
"Romeo"	2006	4	13	—	—	—	—	—	—	—		On the Way to Wonderland
"Fairytale Gone Bad"	2006	2	1	1	3	2	3	2	10	12	FIN: Platinum; GER: Platinum; SWE: Gold; SWI: Gold	On the Way to Wonderland
"Forever Yours"	2007	—	1	1	35	25	42	82	—	—	FIN: Gold	On the Way to Wonderland
"Diamonds"	2007	14	1	1	—	—	—	—	—	—		On the Way to Wonderland
"Heal Me"	2007	16	30	32	58	14	—	—	28	—		On the Way to Wonderland
"Choose to Be Me"	2008	—	—	—	24	27	50	—	—	—		On the Way to Wonderland
"The Whole Story"	2009	14	12	2	26	1	36	82	17	—		Popgasm
"Not Again"	2009	—	—	6	—	—	—	—	—	—		Popgasm
"Welcome to My Life"	2009	—	—	13	35	21	—	—	—	—		Popgasm
"Hollywood Hills"	2011	2	2	3	3	2	3	3	24	15	AUT: Platinum; GER: 5× Gold; SWE: 2× Platinum; SWI: Platinum	Out of Style
"I Don't Dance"	2011	—	—	2	33	6	23	—	—	—		Out of Style
"Somebody Help Me"	2011	—	—	—	—	—	49	—	—	—		Out of Style
"Damn Silence"	2012	—	—	—	—	—	—	—	—	—		Out of Style
"Lifesaver"	2013	—	26	1	9	8	10	12	—	—	GER: Gold; SWI: Gold	Unholy Ground
"Little Bit Love"	2014	—	—	37	80	—	—	—	—	—		Unholy Ground
"You Can Never Be Ready"	2014	—	—	21	30	21	54	29	—	—		Fairytales – Best of 2006–2014
"Nothing Is Over"	2014	—	20	17	16	—	22	20	—	—		Fairytales – Best of 2006–2014
"Prisoner in Paradise" (Note: "Prisoner in Paradise" is included only on the 2016 re-issue of the compilation album, which entitled Fairytales – Best of 2006–2014 (Ten Years Edition).)	2016	—	—	—	89	—	—	—	—	—		Fairytales – Best of 2006–2014
"I Help You Hate Me"	2017	—	3	18	32	6	18	16	—	—	GER: Gold; SWI: Gold	Heartbreak Century
"Let Me Go"	2017	—	26	—	—	—	—	—	—	—		Heartbreak Century
"Heartbreak Century"	2017	—	—	25	—	8	—	54	—	—		Heartbreak Century
"Dreamer" (Note: "Dreamer" is included only on the 2018 Deluxe Gold Edition of Heartbreak Century.)	2018	—	—	20	96	24	—	32	—	—		Heartbreak Century
"Iron Sky"	2019	—	—	—	—	—	—	—	—	—		Iron Sky soundtrack
"Thank You for Everything"	2019	—	—	47	—	—	—	68	—	—		The Very Best of
"I Can Break Your Heart" (Live)	2021	—	—	—	—	—	—	—	—	—		Live with Wonderland Orchestra
"Forever Yours (2022 Version)"	2022	—	—	—	—	—	—	—	—	—		Non-album single
"—" denotes a single that did not chart or was not released in that territory.

=== Promotional singles ===
- "Forever Yours" (2006, Finland only)
- "Birds and Bees" (2009)

== Guest appearances ==
List of non-single guest appearances, with other performing artists, showing year released and album name
Title	Year	Other artist(s)	Album
"Fairytale Gone Bad"	2014	Set Things Right	This Is Home
"It's My Life" (Live)	2020	Helene Fischer	Die Helene Fischer Show – Meine schönsten Momente (Vol. 1)

== Videography ==
=== Video albums ===
List of video albums, with selected certifications
Title	Details	Certifications
Live in Wonderland	Released: 28 September 2007; Label: Bonnier Amigo, Capitol (EMI)	
Out of Style – Live Edition	Released: 4 April 2012; Label: Capitol (EMI)	
Fairytales – Best of 2006–2014 (Ten Years Edition)	Released: 21 October 2016; Label: Universal, Polydor	GER: Gold

=== Music videos ===
List of music videos, showing year released and directors
Title	Year	Director(s)
"Romeo"	2006	Dan Peled
"Fairytale Gone Bad"	2006	Ralf Strathmann
"Forever Yours"	2007	Bastien Francois
"Heal Me"	2007	Unknown
"Diamonds" (Live)	2007	Unknown
"Choose to Be Me"	2008	Unknown
"The Whole Story"	2009	Sandra Marschner
"Welcome to My Life"	2009	Misko Iho
"Not Again"	2009	Jirko Krah
"Birds and Bees"	2009	Dr. Haber, Mikko Riikonen
"Hollywood Hills"	2011	Pekka Hara
"I Don't Dance"	2011	Misko Iho
"Somebody Help Me"	2011	Taina Sirola
"Damn Silence"	2012	Dan Peled
"Lifesaver"	2013	Anne Weigel
"Little Bit Love"	2014	Pekka Hara
"You Can Never Be Ready"	2014	Frank Hoffmann
"Prisoner in Paradise"	2016	Mario Feil
"I Help You Hate Me"	2017	Anna Äärelä
"Heartbreak Century" (Club Tour Version)	2017	Unknown
"Thank You for Everything"	2019	Juho Konstig
"Forever Yours (2022 Version)"	2022	Heikki Salonen

== Special performances and theme songs ==
- "Fairytale Gone Bad" – Tour de France theme song ZDF 2006
- "Choose to Be Me" – Big Brother Germany theme song 2008
- "Fairytale Gone Bad" – Nikolai Valuev vs Jameel McCline WC Heavyweight boxing, Basel Switzerland 2008
- "The Whole Story" – WC athletic games Berlin opening song 2009
- "Not Again" – David Haye vs Nikolai Valuev WC Heavyweight boxing 2009, Nurnberg Germany
- Concert at Munich Olympic Stadium before UEFA Football European League Final game (Munich - Chelsea) in 2012
- "Iron Sky" – theme song from the 2019 film Iron Sky: The Coming Race

== List of songs by Sunrise Avenue ==
List of songs
- "6–0" – Popgasm (2009)
- "Afraid of the Midnight" – Unholy Ground (2013)
- "Afterglow" – Heartbreak Century (2017)
- "Aim for the Kill" – Unholy Ground (2013)
- "All Because of You" – On the Way to Wonderland (2006)
- "Angels on a Rampage" – Out of Style (2011)
- "Bad" – Popgasm (2009)
- "Beautiful" – Heartbreak Century (2017)
- "Birds and Bees" – Popgasm (2009)
- "Bye Bye (One Night Kind)" – Popgasm (2009)
- "Choose to Be Me" – On the Way to Wonderland (2006)
- "Damn Silence" – Out of Style (2011)
- "Destiny" – On the Way to Wonderland (2006)
- "Diamonds" – On the Way to Wonderland (2006)
- "Don't Cry (Don't Think About It)" – Unholy Ground (2013)
- "Dreamer" – Heartbreak Century (Gold Edition) (2018)
- "Dream Like a Child" – Popgasm (2009)
- "Fail Again" – B-side to "Choose to Be Me" single (2008)
- "Fairytale Gone Bad" – On the Way to Wonderland (2006)
- "Feel Alive" – Fairytales – Best of 2006–2014 (Ten Years Edition) (2016)
- "Fight 'Til Dying" – On the Way to Wonderland (2006)
- "Flag" – Heartbreak Century (2017)
- "Forever Yours" – On the Way to Wonderland (2006)
- "Funkytown" (feat. Tommy Lindgren) – Fairytales – Best of 2006–2014 (2014)
- "Girl Like You" – Unholy Ground (2013)
- "Happiness" – Happiness EP (2009)
- "Heal Me" – On the Way to Wonderland (2006)
- "Heartbreak Century" – Heartbreak Century (2017)
- "Hollywood Hills" – Out of Style (2011)
- "Home" – Heartbreak Century (2017)
- "Hurtsville" – Unholy Ground (2013)
- "I Can Break Your Heart" – Unholy Ground (2013)
- "I Don't Dance" – Out of Style (2011)
- "If I Fall" – Unholy Ground (2013)
- "I Gotta Go" – Out of Style (2011)
- "I Help You Hate Me" – Heartbreak Century (2017)
- "Into the Blue" – On the Way to Wonderland (2006)
- "Iron Sky" – Iron Sky soundtrack (2019)
- "It Ain't the Way" – On the Way to Wonderland (2006)
- "Keep Dreaming"
- "Kiss Goodbye" – Out of Style (2011)
- "Kiss 'n' Run" – Popgasm (2009)
- "Lakatut Varpaankynnet" – Dingo cover
- "Let Me Go" – Heartbreak Century (2017)
- "Letters in the Sand" – Unholy Ground (2013)
- "Lifesaver" – Unholy Ground (2013)
- "Little Bit Love" – Unholy Ground (2013)
- "Make It Go Away" – On the Way to Wonderland (2006)
- "Monk Bay" – Popgasm (2009)
- "My Girl Is Mine" – Popgasm (2009)
- "Nasty" – On the Way to Wonderland (Gold Edition) (2006)
- "Never Let Go" – Heartbreak Century (2017)
- "Not Again" – Popgasm (2009)
- "Nothing Is Over" – Fairytales – Best of 2006–2014 (2014)
- "Only" – On the Way to Wonderland (2006)
- "Out of Tune" – Out of Style (2011)
- "Point of No Return" – Heartbreak Century (2017)
- "Prisoner in Paradise" – Fairytales – Best of 2006–2014 (Ten Years Edition) (2016)
- "Question Marks" – Heartbreak Century (2017)
- "Rising Sun" – Popgasm (2009)
- "Romeo" – On the Way to Wonderland (2006)
- "Room" – Heartbreak Century (2017)
- "Runaway" – Happiness EP (2009)
- "Sail Away with Me" – Popgasm (2009)
- "Sex & Cigarettes" – Out of Style (2011)
- "Somebody Help Me" – Out of Style (2011)
- "Somebody Like Me (Crazy)" – Heartbreak Century (2017)
- "Somebody Will Find You" – Happiness EP (2009)
- "Something Sweet" – Popgasm (2009)
- "Stormy End" – Out of Style (2011)
- "Streams of Sun" – Demo (2004)
- "Sunny Day" – On the Way to Wonderland (2006)
- "Sweet Symphony" – Out of Style (2011)
- "Thank You for Everything" – The Very Best of (2020)
- "That's All" – Out of Style (Special Edition) (2011)
- "The First Cut Is the Deepest" – Cat Stevens live cover, Popgasm (Japanese Edition) (2009)
- "The Right One" – Out of Style (2011)
- "The Way You Make Me Feel" – Michael Jackson live cover, Acoustic Tour 2010 (2010)
- "The Whole Story" – Popgasm (2009)
- "Unholy Ground" – Unholy Ground (2013)
- "Welcome to My Life" – Popgasm (2009)
- "What I Like About You" – B-side to "Hollywood Hills" single (2011)
- "Wonderland" – On the Way to Wonderland (2006)
- "You Can Never Be Ready" – Fairytales – Best of 2006–2014 (2014)
