= Unholy Ground =

Studio album by Sunrise Avenue
- Released: 18 October 2013
- Recorded: 2012–2013
- Genre: Pop rock
- Length: 40:16
- Labels: Polydor; Universal Music
- Producers: Jukka Backlund; Jukka Immonen

Sunrise Avenue chronology
Out of Style (2011)	Unholy Ground (2013)	Fairytales – Best of 2006–2014 (2014)

Singles from Unholy Ground
- 1. "Lifesaver" Released: 13 September 2013; 2. "Little Bit Love" Released: 28 March 2014

Professional ratings
Review scores
Source	Rating
Rumba	1/5 stars

Unholy Ground is the fourth studio album by the Finnish rock band Sunrise Avenue. It was released on 18 October 2013 by Polydor Records and Universal Music.

== Track listing ==
Disc 1: Unholy Ground
No.	Title	Writer(s)	Length
1.	"Unholy Ground"	Samu Haber; Carl Björsell; Sharon Vaughn	3:10
2.	"Lifesaver"	Haber; Jukka Immonen; Pontus Karlsson; Karl-Ola Kjellholm; John Hårleman; Jakke Erixson; Teemu Brunila; Vaughn	3:58
3.	"Little Bit Love"	Haber; Immonen	3:45
4.	"I Can Break Your Heart"	Haber; Aku Sinivalo	3:47
5.	"Hurtsville"	Haber; Björsell; Vaughn	3:20
6.	"Letters in the Sand"	Haber; Immonen; Vaughn	3:56
7.	"Girl Like You"	Haber; Jukka Backlund; Osmo Ikonen	3:47
8.	"If I Fall"	Haber; Immonen	3:56
9.	"Aim for the Kill"	Haber; Björsell; Vaughn	3:55
10.	"Don't Cry (Don't Think About It)"	Haber; Immonen	3:27
11.	"Afraid of the Midnight"	Haber; Vaughn; Peter Kvint	3:14

Disc 2: Live from the Big Band Theory Tour / 2013 (Special Deluxe Edition)
No.	Title	Writer(s)	Length
1.	"Police Squad Opening Theme" (live)	Ira Newborn	2:22
2.	"I Gotta Go" (live)	Haber; Immonen; Riku Rajamaa	2:43
3.	"I Don't Dance" (live)	Haber; Immonen	4:42
4.	"Out of Tune" (live)	Haber; Backlund; Rajamaa; Ikonen	5:22
5.	"Angels on a Rampage" (live)	Haber; Björsell; Vaughn	5:55
6.	"Olvida Me (Fairytale Gone Bad/Spanish Version)" (live)	Haber; Backlund	8:27
7.	"Happiness" (live)	Haber; Backlund	7:07
8.	"Stormy End" (live)	Haber; Immonen	6:22
9.	"6–0" (live)	Haber; Backlund; Visa Oscar	7:20
10.	"Hollywood Hills" (live)	Haber	6:26

== Personnel ==
Credits for Unholy Ground are adapted from the official liner notes and Tidal.

=== Sunrise Avenue ===
- Samu Haber – vocals, guitar
- Sami Osala – drums
- Raul Ruutu – bass guitar
- Riku Rajamaa – guitar

=== Additional musicians ===
- Sharon Vaughn – background vocals (track 1), spoken interlude (4)
- Osmo Ikonen – piano, organ (track 6)
- Czech National Symphony Orchestra – strings (tracks 2, 5, 6, 8, 10, 11)

=== Technical ===
- Jukka Immonen – production, recording, programming (tracks 1–6, 8–11); arrangement (2, 5, 6, 8, 10, 11)
- Jukka Backlund – production, recording, programming (track 7)
- Carl Björsell – recording (tracks 1, 5)
- Peter Kvint – recording (track 11)
- Lasse Enersen – arrangement (tracks 2, 5, 6, 8, 10, 11)
- Svante Forsbäck – mastering
- Jesse Vainio – mixing
- Jetro Vainio – audio editing
- Matthias Bäuerle – artwork, layout, logotype
- Olaf Heine – photography

== Charts ==
=== Weekly charts ===
Chart (2013)	Peak position
Austrian Albums (Ö3 Austria)	4
Finnish Albums (Suomen virallinen lista)	10
German Albums (Offizielle Top 100)	3
Swiss Albums (Schweizer Hitparade)	4

=== Year-end charts ===
Chart (2013)	Position
Austrian Albums (Ö3 Austria)	46
German Albums (Offizielle Top 100)	24
Swiss Albums (Schweizer Hitparade)	73

Chart (2014)	Position
Austrian Albums (Ö3 Austria)	72
German Albums (Offizielle Top 100)	96
Swiss Albums (Schweizer Hitparade)	49

== Certifications ==
Region	Certification	Certified units/sales
Austria (IFPI Austria)	Gold	7,500^{*}
Germany (BVMI)	3× Gold	300,000^{‡}
Switzerland (IFPI Switzerland)	Gold	10,000^{^}
^{*} Sales figures based on certification alone.^{^} Shipments figures based on certification alone.^{‡} Sales+streaming figures based on certification alone.
