= Jukka Backlund =

Finnish musician and producer (born 1982)

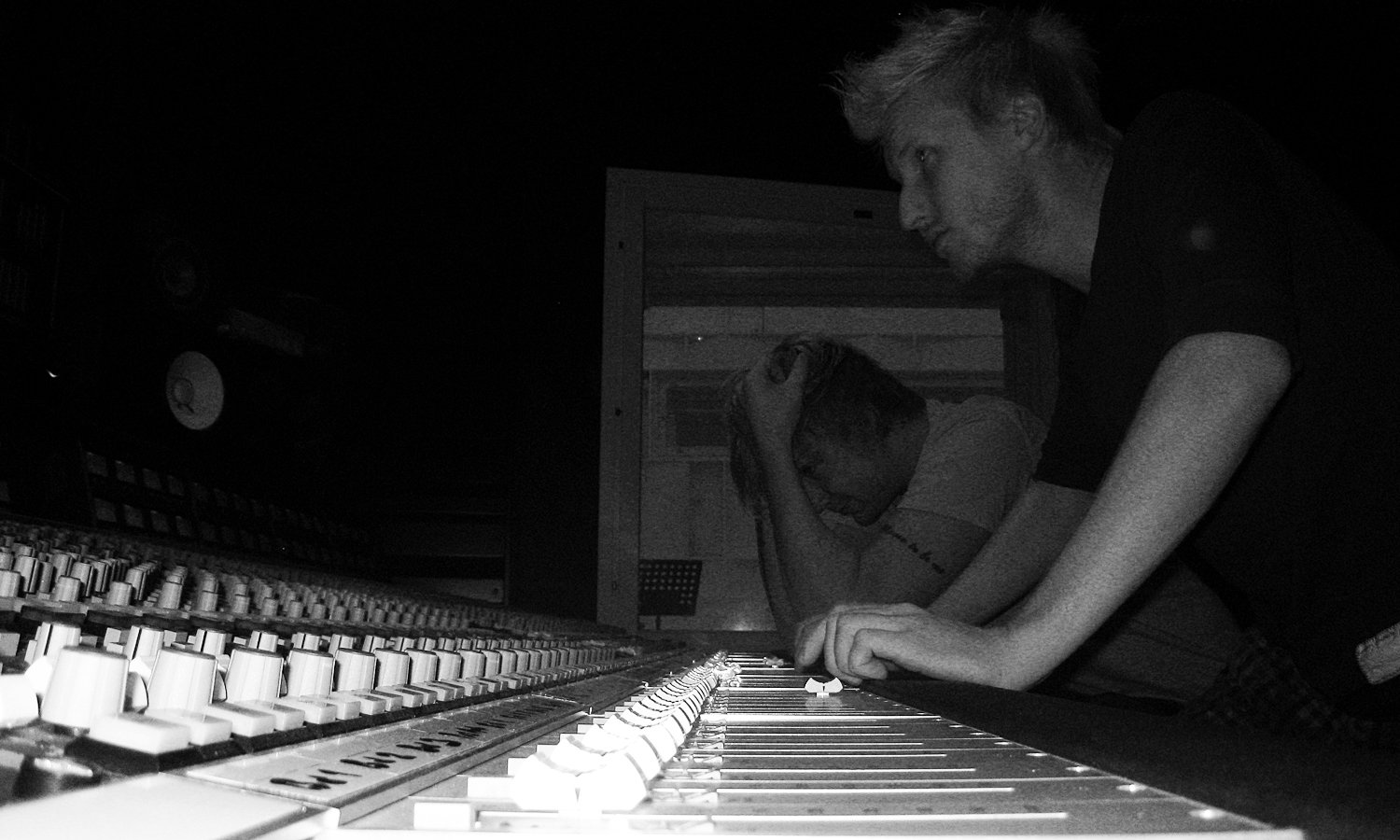
- Backlund in 2008

Background information
- Born: Jukka Henri Kristian Backlund; 30 December 1982 (age 43); Helsinki, Finland
- Genre: Rock
- Occupations: Musician; record producer
- Instruments: Keyboards; piano; drums; vocals; guitar; bass
- Years active: 1998–present
- Member of: DEAD SIRIUS 3000
- Formerly of: Sunrise Avenue
- Website: jukkab.com

Jukka Henri Kristian Backlund (born 30 December 1982) is a Finnish music producer and multi-instrumentalist. He was previously a member of the Finnish rock band Sunrise Avenue, where he played keyboards. He is best known for producing their first album, On the Way to Wonderland, which is the best-selling international debut from Finland. Many of the songs on the album were co-written by Backlund and the lead singer Samu Haber, including the singles "Fairytale Gone Bad" and "Forever Yours".

== Life and career ==
As a musician, Backlund has worked as a bandleader and keyboardist for numerous artists since he started his professional career in 1998. In 2011, he founded the pop-fusion band DEAD SIRIUS 3000 with his brother Tapio Backlund and guitarist Petteri Sariola. In this band, Backlund plays drums.

Backlund started studying classical piano at the age of five. Later, he studied jazz and musical composition in the youth department of Sibelius Academy. His father was jazz musician Kaj Backlund.

== Selected discography ==
Backlund has contributed to these records, among others:

Year	Album name	Role
2003	Janina Fry – Impossible Love	Producer
2003	Technicolour – Way Out	Producer
2003	Laura Voutilainen – Päiväkirja	Producer, touchpad
2003	M. Heavenly – File Under: Music	Producer, keyboards
2003	Killer – Sure You Know How to Drive This Thing	Producer, keyboards
2004	Gimmel – Pisaroita ja kyyneleitä	Producer, mixing, keyboards, vocals, programming
2004	Tommy Tabermann – Mulle kaikki heti nyt	Producer, mixing, keyboards, programming
2004	Christian Forss – Christian Forss	Producer, mixing, keyboards, vocals, programming
2004	Idols – Tuulet puhaltaa	Producer, mixing
2004	Kaija Koo – Viiden minuutin hiljaisuus	Producer
2004	Maryland – Almond of Life	Engineer
2004	Geir Rönning – Ready for the Ride	Producer, mixing, keyboards
2004	Hanna Pakarinen – When I Become Me	Producer, mixing, keyboards, vocals
2005	Reetaleena – Avaimet	Producer, mixing, keyboards
2005	Mariska – Suden hetki	Guitar
2005	Antti Tuisku – Minun jouluni	Producer, mixing
2005	Hanna Pakarinen – Stronger	Producer, mixing
2006	Katri Ylander – Katri Ylander	Producer, mixing, guitars, bass, keyboards
2006	Laura Voutilainen – Lauran päiväkirja	Keyboards production
2006	Ilkka Jääskeläinen – Vuosisadan rakkaustarina	Producer, mixing, keyboards
2006	Antti Tuisku – New York	Vocal production
2006	Antti Tuisku – Rovaniemi	Producer, mixing, guitars, keyboards, drums
2006	Sunrise Avenue – On the Way to Wonderland	Producer, mixing, keyboards, vocals, programming
2007	Kristian Meurman – Ensiaskeleet	Producer, mixing, guitars, keyboards, programming
2007	Katri Ylander – Kaikki nämä sanat	Producer, mixing, keyboards, guitar
2007	Kristiina Brask – Silmät sydämeen	Producer, mixing, keyboards, guitar, programming
2007	Boycott – Hits Back	Producer, mixing, keyboards, guitar, programming
2007	Ninja Sarasalo – I Don't Play Guitar	Producer, mixing, guitars, keyboards, programming
2008	Laura Voutilainen – Kosketa mua	Producer, mixing, keyboards, programming
2008	Killer Aspect – How Does It Work	Producer, mixing, keyboards, vocals, programming
2009	Sunrise Avenue – Popgasm	Producer, mixing, guitars, bass, keyboards, vocals, programming
2009	Clarkkent – This Is Personal	Producer, mixing, keyboards, programming
2009	Antti Tuisku – Hengitän	Producer, recording, mixing, keyboards, guitar, drums, programming
2010	Laura Voutilainen – Suurimmat hitit	Producer, mixing, keyboards, programming
2010	Aikakone – Vuosisadan rakkaustarina	Producer, mixing, keyboards, programming
2010	Sunrise Avenue – Acoustic Tour 2010	Keyboards
2010	Flamboy – Neighbour Girl Revolution	Producer, mixing, keyboards, drums, bass, guitars, programming
2011	Fireal – The Dark Side	Producer, keyboards, programming
2011	Katri Ylander – Maailman ihanimmat	Producer, keyboards, programming, guitars
2011	Sunrise Avenue – Out of Style	Producer, keyboards, programming, guitars, bass, drums
2011	Stina Girs – Sydän edellä	Keyboards
2013	Jenni Jaakkola – Siipeni Mun	Producer, keyboards, programming
2013	Michael Eb – "Lost in the Sea" – Single	Producer, mixing, keyboards, vocals, programming
2013	Sunrise Avenue – Unholy Ground	Producer, piano, programming
2013	DEAD SIRIUS 3000 – Get Sirius	Band member, drums, keyboards, programming, producer
2015	Jukka Backlund – "The Sparrow's Christmas Morning" – Single	Solo release
2018	Michael Eb – "Campfire Song" – Single	Producer, mixing, keyboards, vocals, programming
2018	Nik Mystery – When – EP	Band member, keyboards, programming, producer
2019	Nik Mystery – "Maniac" – Single	Band member, keyboards, programming, producer
2019	Nik Mystery – "By a Thread" – Single	Band member, keyboards, programming, producer
2020	FloMende – "Spieglein an der Wand" – Single	Producer, programming, piano
2021	Michael Eb – "The One" – Single	Producer, keyboards, programming
2022	Michael Eb – "Beste Zeit" – Single	Producer, keyboards, programming, piano
2023	Michael Eb – "Wann fangen wir an" – Single	Producer, keyboards, programming, piano
2024	Michael Eb – "Keep on Dancing" – Single	Producer, keyboards, programming, piano
2025	Michael Eb – "Home" – Single	Producer, keyboards, programming, piano

== Awards ==
- 2 Finnish Grammy Awards
- 6 NRJ Radio Awards
- European Border Breaker Award
- Eska Award
- Impala Award
- Radio Regenbogen Award
