= Out of Style =

Studio album by Sunrise Avenue
- Released: 25 March 2011
- Recorded: 2010–2011
- Genres: Emo pop; rock
- Length: 47:51
- Labels: Capitol; Universal Music
- Producers: Jukka Backlund; Jukka Immonen

Sunrise Avenue chronology
Popgasm (2009)	Out of Style (2011)	Unholy Ground (2013)

Singles from Out of Style
- 1. "Hollywood Hills" Released: 25 February 2011; 2. "I Don't Dance" Released: 13 June 2011; 3. "Somebody Help Me" Released: 31 October 2011; 4. "Damn Silence" Released: 19 March 2012

Professional ratings
Review scores
Source	Rating
AllMusic	3/5 stars
Desibeli.net	3/5 stars
Nyt.fi	2/5 stars
Rumba	2/5 stars
V2.fi	2.5/5 stars

Out of Style is the third studio album by the Finnish rock band Sunrise Avenue. It was released on 25 March 2011 by Capitol Records and Universal Music.

== Track listing ==
No.	Title	Writer(s)	Length
1.	"Hollywood Hills"	Samu Haber	3:30
2.	"Damn Silence"	Haber; Jukka Backlund; Riku Rajamaa	4:06
3.	"Somebody Help Me"	Haber; Backlund	4:22
4.	"I Don't Dance"	Haber; Jukka Immonen	3:24
5.	"I Gotta Go"	Haber; Immonen; Rajamaa	3:10
6.	"Stormy End"	Haber; Immonen	4:04
7.	"Kiss Goodbye"	Haber; Backlund	4:25
8.	"Sex & Cigarettes"	Haber	3:15
9.	"The Right One"	Haber; Backlund; Rajamaa	4:21
10.	"Out of Tune"	Haber; Backlund; Rajamaa; Osmo Ikonen	3:41
11.	"Angels on a Rampage"	Haber; Carl Björsell; Sharon Vaughn	4:16
12.	"Sweet Symphony"	Haber; Backlund	6:35

Special edition bonus CD
No.	Title	Writer(s)	Length
1.	"That's All" (2010 studio demo)	Haber; Backlund	2:40
2.	"Somebody Will Find You" (2009 version)	Haber; Backlund	3:17
3.	"Hollywood Hills" (special version)	Haber	4:02
4.	"Out of Tune" (special version)	Haber; Backlund; Rajamaa; Ikonen	4:43
5.	"Stormy End" (special version)	Haber; Immonen	3:45
6.	"Somebody Help Me" (special version)	Haber; Backlund	5:54
7.	"On the Way to Wonderland" (special version)	Haber; Backlund; Janne Kärkkäinen	3:34

== Personnel ==
Credits for Out of Style are adapted from the official liner notes and Tidal.

=== Sunrise Avenue ===
- Samu Haber – vocals, guitar (all tracks); bass guitar (track 4), choir (8, 10), recording (2, 3, 7–10, 12)
- Sami Osala – drums, percussion (all tracks); choir (tracks 8, 10)
- Raul Ruutu – bass guitar (all tracks), choir (tracks 8, 10)
- Riku Rajamaa – guitar (all tracks), banjo (track 7), choir (8, 10)

=== Additional musicians ===
- Sharon Vaughn – background vocals (track 11)
- Jukka Backlund – guitar (track 3), drums (9), bass guitar (12)
- Osmo Ikonen – choir (tracks 8, 10), organ (9)
- Lasse Enersen – strings (tracks 1, 6)

=== Technical ===
- Jukka Backlund – production, recording, programming (tracks 2, 3, 7–10, 12)
- Jukka Immonen – production, recording, programming (tracks 1, 4–6, 11)
- Svante Forsbäck – mastering
- Jesse Vainio – mixing (all tracks), recording (tracks 2, 3, 7–10, 12)
- Jetro Vainio – recording (tracks 2, 3, 7–10, 12)
- Arttu Peljo – mixing (track 4), recording (1, 4–6, 11)
- Kalle Pyyhtinen – graphic design
- Ville Juurikkala – photography

== Charts ==
=== Weekly charts ===
Chart (2011)	Peak position
Austrian Albums (Ö3 Austria)	6
Finnish Albums (Suomen virallinen lista)	2
German Albums (Offizielle Top 100)	6
Swiss Albums (Schweizer Hitparade)	8

=== Year-end charts ===
Chart (2011)	Position
Austrian Albums (Ö3 Austria)	64
German Albums (Offizielle Top 100)	28
Swiss Albums (Schweizer Hitparade)	52

== Certifications ==
Certifications for Out of Style
Region	Certification	Certified units/sales
Finland (Musiikkituottajat)	Gold	14,555
Germany (BVMI)	3× Gold	300,000^{‡}
^{‡} Sales+streaming figures based on certification alone.
