= Hollywood Hills (disambiguation) =

The Hollywood Hills are a landform and a historic neighborhood in Los Angeles, California, United States.

Hollywood Hills may also refer to:

- "Hollywood Hills" (song), by Sunrise Avenue
- Hollywood Hills Amphitheater at Walt Disney World Resort in Florida
- Hollywood Hills High School in Hollywood, Florida
- Hollywood Hills West, a neighborhood of Los Angeles
