= Popgasm =

Studio album by Sunrise Avenue
- Released: 6 May 2009
- Recorded: 2008–2009
- Genre: Pop rock
- Length: 53:33
- Labels: Bonnier Amigo; Capitol (EMI)
- Producers: Jukka Backlund; MachoPsycho

Sunrise Avenue chronology
On the Way to Wonderland (2006)	Popgasm (2009)	Out of Style (2011)

Alternative cover
- Japanese release

Singles from Popgasm
- 1. "The Whole Story" Released: 2 March 2009; 2. "Not Again" Released: 29 July 2009; 3. "Welcome to My Life" Released: 28 October 2009

Professional ratings
Review scores
Source	Rating
AllMusic	3.5/5 stars
Rumba	negative
Soundi	3/5 stars
V2.fi	2.5/5 stars

Popgasm is the second studio album by the Finnish rock band Sunrise Avenue. It was released on 6 May 2009 by Bonnier Music and EMI.

== Track listing ==
All tracks are written by Samu Haber and Jukka Backlund, except where noted.

No.	Title	Writer(s)	Length
1.	"Dream Like a Child"		4:21
2.	"The Whole Story"	Haber; MachoPsycho	3:33
3.	"Rising Sun"		3:54
4.	"Welcome to My life"		3:29
5.	"Not Again"		3:52
6.	"Bad"	Haber; Backlund; Riku Rajamaa	3:28
7.	"Monk Bay"		3:49
8.	"Bye Bye (One Night Kind)"		3:18
9.	"Kiss 'n' Run"	Haber; MachoPsycho; Rajamaa	3:14
10.	"6–0"	Haber; Backlund; Visa Oscar	3:15
11.	"Birds and Bees"	Haber; Backlund; Aku Sinivalo	3:07
12.	"Sail Away with Me"		4:06
13.	"My Girl Is Mine"		3:15
14.	"Something Sweet"		6:52

Finnish and German download bonus tracks
No.	Title	Length
15.	"Somebody Will Find You"	3:16
16.	"Runaway"	3:36

Japanese edition bonus tracks
No.	Title	Writer(s)	Length
15.	"The Whole Story" (acoustic)	Haber; MachoPsycho	3:29
16.	"Runaway"		3:36
17.	"Happiness"		3:24
18.	"The First Cut Is the Deepest" (live recording at Sonic Pump Studios)	Cat Stevens	3:48

== Personnel ==
=== Sunrise Avenue ===
- Samu Haber – vocals, guitar (all tracks); arrangement (tracks 1, 3–8, 10–14)
- Sami Osala – drums (all tracks); arrangement (tracks 1, 3–8, 10–14)
- Raul Ruutu – bass guitar (all tracks); arrangement (tracks 1, 3–8, 10–14)
- Riku Rajamaa – guitar (all tracks); arrangement (tracks 1, 3–8, 10–14)

=== Additional musicians ===
- Ilkka Lehtonen – strings, violin, concertmaster (tracks 4, 6, 10, 14)
- Jukka Backlund – synthesizer, piano

=== Technical ===
- Jukka Backlund – production, arrangement (tracks 1, 3–8, 10–14)
- MachoPsycho – production, arrangement (tracks 2, 9)
- Svante Forsbäck – mastering
- Jesse Vainio – mixing
- Tim Juckenack – artwork
- Ville Juurikkala – photography

== Charts ==
=== Weekly charts ===
Chart (2009)	Peak position
Austrian Albums (Ö3 Austria)	13
Finnish Albums (Suomen virallinen lista)	5
German Albums (Offizielle Top 100)	16
Swiss Albums (Schweizer Hitparade)	7
