= Killer Aspect =

Finnish rock band

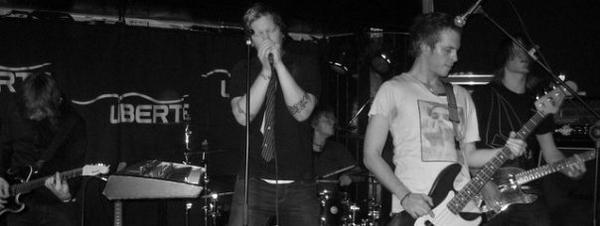
- Killer Aspect performing in 2007

Background information
- Origin: Helsinki, Finland
- Genres: Rock
- Years active: 2004—present
- Labels: Kentala Music
- Spinoff of: Killer
- Members: Max Paananen; Jaakko Teittinen; Jukka Savela; Teijo Jämsä; Jarkko Toivanen
- Past members: Samuli Relander; Valeri Drobych; Lauri Yrjölä; Tapio Backlund; Jaakko Pulkki; Esa Mäkynen; Jukka Backlund; Timo Huhtala

Killer Aspect is a Finnish rock band from Helsinki. Its members are Max Paananen (vocals), Jaakko Teittinen (guitar), Jukka Savela (guitar), Jarkko Toivanen (bass), and Teijo Jämsä (drums). Their first single, "TV", made it to number one in the YleX radio charts.

== Career ==
Killer Aspect was founded in 2004 as Cabincrew by two former members of the band Killer - Timo Huhtala and Teijo Jämsä - and Samuli Relander, who used to play guitar for the bands The Winyls and Personal Aspect.

Since the name Cabincrew was already used by a dance act, the three changed their name to Killer Aspect, inspired by their former bands. They began meeting at Timo's place and after listening to some demo tapes, they decided to get serious about their musical effort. The band was soon rounded out by Max Paanen, a friend of Timo's, and Jukka Backlund, Killer's on-tour keyboard player.

The band started practising at Kaapelitehdas (the Cable Factory) and wrote their first song, "First Dance". This was followed by a few more, after which the band booked Finnvox Studios and recorded their first six tracks. After that, they started rehearsing for their first shows and went on to play Provinssirock, Tavastia Club (opening for Poets of the Fall), and the On the Rocks club in Helsinki.

In 2006, Jukka Backlund left the band to become a full-time member of Sunrise Avenue, the band whose debut album he had produced and whom he had initially joined as a live keyboard player.

In 2007, Valeri Drobych - the youngest member of the band - completed Killer Aspect. He had known Teijo and Timo through a video shoot for Natalia Podolskaya's "Nobody Hurt No One", a song written by Valeri's father as a Russian contribution to the Eurovision Song Contest in 2005. Valeri and Teijo also played with Natalia's live setup in Kyiv.

Killer Aspect's first single, "TV", began getting radio airplay in December 2007 and immediately made it to number one in the YleX radio charts. Their follow-up single "Bloodshot" was also successful and made it to number 5 in the year's hitlist. The band's debut album, How Does It Work, was released in April 2008.

In late 2008, Timo Huhtala left the band and Jaakko Pulkki took over on bass.

After a record label change and a new record deal, plus a new lineup, the band released their second album, Brand New Start, on 5 April 2013.

In 2015, Killer Aspect began to write new songs with a fresh lineup (Jaakko Teittinen on guitar and Jarkko Toivanen on bass), and they have since released several singles from their upcoming album.

In May 2021, they released a new single, called "Troubles" and another one in August 2021, "Back to Basics".

== Band members ==
Current

- Max Paananen – vocals
- Jaakko Teittinen – guitar
- Jukka Savela – guitar
- Jarkko Toivanen – bass
- Teijo Jämsä – drums

Former

- Samuli Relander – guitar
- Valeri Drobych – guitar
- Lauri Yrjölä – guitar
- Tapio Backlund – bass
- Jaakko Pulkki – bass
- Esa Mäkynen – bass
- Timo Huhtala – bass
- Jukka Backlund – keyboards

== Discography ==
Studio albums

- How Does It Work (2008)
- Brand New Start (2013)

Singles

- "TV" (2007)
- "Bloodshot" (2008)
- "Writings on the Wall" (2012)
- "Box Car Champion" (2013)
- "The High Road" (2019)
- "Black Summer" (2019)
- "Ten Steps" (2019)
- "The Good, the Bad and the Worst" (2019)
- "Troubles" (2021)
- "Back to Basics (2021)
