= On the Way to Wonderland =

Studio album by Sunrise Avenue
- Released: 25 August 2006
- Recorded: 2006
- Genres: Pop rock; post-grunge
- Length: 55:54
- Labels: Bonnier Amigo; Capitol (EMI)
- Producer: Jukka Backlund

Sunrise Avenue chronology
On the Way to Wonderland (2006)	Popgasm (2009)

Singles from On the Way to Wonderland
- 1. "All Because of You" Released: 15 February 2006; 2. "Romeo" Released: 19 April 2006; 3. "Fairytale Gone Bad" Released: 11 August 2006; 4. "Forever Yours" Released: 27 April 2007; 5. "Diamonds" Released: 9 May 2007; 6. "Heal Me" Released: 12 September 2007; 7. "Choose to Be Me" Released: 20 February 2008

Professional ratings
Review scores
Source	Rating
AllMusic	3/5 stars
Desibeli.net	3.5/5 stars
Nyt.fi	2/5 stars
Soundi	2/5 stars

On the Way to Wonderland is the debut studio album by the Finnish rock band Sunrise Avenue. It was released on 25 August 2006 by Bonnier Music and EMI.

== Track listing ==
All tracks are written by Samu Haber and Jukka Backlund, except where noted.

No.	Title	Writer(s)	Length
1.	"Choose to Be Me"	Haber	4:11
2.	"Forever Yours"		3:22
3.	"All Because of You"	Haber; Michael Blair	3:48
4.	"Fairytale Gone Bad"		3:25
5.	"Diamonds"		3:14
6.	"Heal Me"		4:22
7.	"It Ain't the Way"		3:23
8.	"Make It Go Away"	Haber	3:38
9.	"Destiny"	Haber; Blair	2:58
10.	"Sunny Day"	Haber; Blair	3:53
11.	"Only"		3:46
12.	"Into the Blue"	Haber; Janne Kärkkäinen	5:28
13.	"Romeo"	Haber	3:03
14.	"Fight 'Til Dying"		3:16
15.	"Wonderland"	Haber; Backlund; Kärkkäinen	5:38

Gold edition bonus tracks
No.	Title	Writer(s)	Length
16.	"Nasty" (acoustic bonus)		2:41
17.	"Forever Yours" (Nightliner mix)	Haber; Backlund; Aku Sinivalo	5:55
18.	"Forever Yours" (acoustic version)		3:07
19.	"Forever Yours" (single version)		3:23
20.	"Fairytale Gone Bad" (acoustic version)		3:44
21.	"Fairytale Gone Bad" (Supermodels from Paris remix)		7:20

== Personnel ==
=== Sunrise Avenue ===
- Samu Haber – lead vocals, guitar, arrangement
- Jukka Backlund – keyboards, background vocals, arrangement, production, engineering, mixing
- Sami Osala – drums, arrangement
- Raul Ruutu – bass guitar, background vocals, arrangement
- Janne Kärkkäinen – guitar, background vocals, arrangement

=== Technical ===
- Thomas Eberger – mastering
- Björn Engelmann – mastering
- Ville Juurikkala – photography

== Charts ==
=== Weekly charts ===
Chart (2006–07)	Peak position
Austrian Albums (Ö3 Austria)	5
Finnish Albums (Suomen virallinen lista)	2
German Albums (Offizielle Top 100)	12
Greek Albums (IFPI)	1
Italian Albums (FIMI)	69
Swedish Albums (Sverigetopplistan)	10
Swiss Albums (Schweizer Hitparade)	15

=== Year-end charts ===
Chart (2007)	Position
Austrian Albums (Ö3 Austria)	44
German Albums (Offizielle Top 100)	32
Swiss Albums (Schweizer Hitparade)	35

== Certifications ==
Sales certifications for On the Way to Wonderland
Region	Certification	Certified units/sales
Austria (IFPI Austria)	Gold	15,000^{*}
Finland (Musiikkituottajat)	Platinum	47,613
Germany (BVMI)	Platinum	200,000^{^}
Greece (IFPI Greece)	Gold	7,500^{^}
Switzerland (IFPI Switzerland)	Gold	15,000^{^}
^{*} Sales figures based on certification alone.^{^} Shipments figures based on certification alone.
