= Alasin Media =

Finnish media industry company

Alasin Media Oy
- Type: Private
- Industry: Web portals
- Founded: 2004
- Headquarters: Tampere, Finland
- Key people: Mikko-Heikki Heinonen (CEO); Petri Isomäki (Executive vice president); Ville-Veikko Heinonen (Chairman)
- Products: AV-production internet content translation services photograph
- Revenue: €314 000 (2009)
- Net income: ▲€1 000 (2009)
- Website: www.alasinmedia.fi

Alasin Media Oy is a Finnish media industry company, founded in the year 2004, that produces communication to different media and translation services. Alasin Media operates and is headquartered in Tampere, Finland. Mikko-Heikki Heinonen acts as CEO, Ville-Veikko Heinonen as chairman.

To the single Finnish consumer, works by Alasin Media can be seen e.g. in Nokian Tyres promotional material. The company is also active on the internet as the producer of the websites V2.fi and Keskiarvo.net. Alasin Media was the content provider of the website Peliplaneetta.net for over five years, until the beginning of year 2007.
