= Siiri Nordin =

Finnish singer (born 1980)

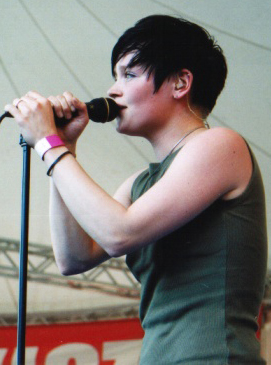
- Siiri Nordin on a Killer gig in Turku in 2002

Background information
- Born: 15 October 1980 (age 45); Helsinki, Finland
- Origin: Finland
- Instruments: Guitar and voice

Siiri Nordin (born 15 October 1980) is a Finnish singer. She was the lead singer of the now defunct Finnish rock band Killer.

== Biography ==
Nordin was born in Helsinki. In 2003, she had a solo hit with the song "Sydämeni osuman sai", included on the soundtrack of the movie Helmiä ja sikoja. The song is a cover version of the David and Jonathan hit song "Something's Gotten Hold of My Heart".

In 2004, Nordin took a break from music and took up boat carpentry. She entered a civil union with her girlfriend, Mirja, in the autumn. She has also worked as a taxi driver.

In April 2006, she released a solo album called Me Too, released by the Finnish label, Next Big Thing. In March 2008, she released the Finnish-language album Lyö Tahtia.

Nordin participated in the 2011 Dancing with the Stars Compatible 6 with Jani Rasimus as her partner.

In 2017, she moved from Helsinki to the village of Mathildedahl in southwest Finland.

== Discography ==
=== Albums ===
- 2006, Me Too
- 2008, Lyö Tahtia
