= Heartbreak Century =

Studio album by Sunrise Avenue
- Released: 6 October 2017
- Recorded: 2016–2017
- Genres: Indie pop; pop rock
- Length: 41:16
- Labels: Polydor; Universal Music
- Producers: Victor Thell; Jukka Immonen; Nicolas Rebscher

Sunrise Avenue chronology
Fairytales – Best of 2006–2014 (2014)	Heartbreak Century (2017)

Singles from Heartbreak Century
- 1. "I Help You Hate Me" Released: 18 August 2017; 2. "Let Me Go" Released: 1 September 2017; 3. "Heartbreak Century" Released: 15 September 2017; 4. "Dreamer" Released: 6 July 2018

Heartbreak Century is the fifth and final studio album by the Finnish rock band Sunrise Avenue. It was released on 6 October 2017 by Polydor Records and Universal Music. The album peaked at #1 in Germany.

== Track listing ==
All tracks are written by Samu Haber, Maria Jane Smith and Victor Thell, except where noted.

No.	Title	Writer(s)	Length
1.	"Never Let Go"	Haber; Kurt Nilsen	3:17
2.	"Heartbreak Century"		2:50
3.	"I Help You Hate Me"	Haber; Smith; Thell; Wayne Hector	3:12
4.	"Afterglow"		3:38
5.	"Point of No Return"	Haber; Jukka Immonen	3:32
6.	"Flag"	Haber; Ali Zuckowski; Nicolas Rebscher; Simon Triebel	3:39
7.	"Let Me Go"	Haber; Rebscher	3:12
8.	"Question Marks"		3:47
9.	"Somebody Like Me (Crazy)"		3:37
10.	"Beautiful"		3:57
11.	"Room"	Haber; Sharon Vaughn; Mohammad Denebi	3:33
12.	"Home"	Haber; Vaughn; Denebi	3:02
Total length:			41:16

=== 2018 Deluxe Gold Edition ===
All tracks are written by Samu Haber, Maria Jane Smith and Victor Thell, except where noted.

Disc 1: Heartbreak Century
No.	Title	Length
1.	"Dreamer"	3:16
Total length:		44:32

Disc 2: Heartbreak Century (Remixes & Acoustic Session)
No.	Title	Writer(s)	Length
1.	"I Help You Hate Me" (Madizin mix)	Haber; Smith; Thell; Hector	3:23
2.	"Flag" (Madizin mix)	Haber; Zuckowski; Rebscher; Triebel	2:44
3.	"Never Let Go" (Madizin mix)	Haber; Nilsen	4:59
4.	"Heartbreak Century" (Madizin mix)		3:23
5.	"Afterglow" (Madizin mix)		3:21
6.	"Somebody Like Me (Crazy)" (Madizin mix)		5:00
7.	"Beautiful" (Madizin mix)		2:38
8.	"Question Marks" (Madizin mix)		4:07
9.	"I Help You Hate Me" (acoustic session)	Haber; Smith; Thell; Hector	2:47
10.	"Home" (acoustic session)	Haber; Vaughn; Denebi	2:33
11.	"Point of No Return" (acoustic session)	Haber; Immonen	2:08
12.	"Beautiful" (acoustic session)		3:10
13.	"Somebody Like Me (Crazy)" (acoustic session)		2:50
14.	"Heartbreak Century" (acoustic session)		2:02
Total length:			45:05

== Personnel ==
Credits for Heartbreak Century are adapted from the official liner notes and Tidal, with "Dreamer" being referred to as track 1.

=== Sunrise Avenue ===
- Samu Haber – vocals, guitar
- Sami Osala – drums, percussion
- Raul Ruutu – bass guitar
- Riku Rajamaa – guitar

=== Additional musicians ===
- Maria Jane Smith – background vocals (tracks 1, 3–5, 10), foot stomping (10)
- Victor Thell – background vocals (tracks 1, 3–5, 10); guitar, keyboards (3–5, 9–11)
- Nicolas Rebscher – background vocals, guitar, keyboards (tracks 7, 8)
- Sharon Vaughn – background vocals (tracks 12, 13)
- Jukka Immonen – keyboards (tracks 2, 6, 12, 13)
- Mohammad Denebi – guitar (track 13)

=== Technical ===
- Victor Thell – production, recording (tracks 1, 3–5, 9–11)
- Jukka Immonen – production, recording (tracks 2, 6, 12, 13)
- Nicolas Rebscher – production, recording (tracks 7, 8)
- Samu Haber – executive producer (all tracks), production (track 1)
- Willem Bleeker – recording (tracks 3–5, 9)
- Kalle Keskikuru – recording (tracks 1, 6–8, 12, 13)
- Sami Osala – drum recording (tracks 10, 11)
- Mohammad Denebi – guitar recording (track 13)
- Svante Forsbäck – mastering
- Jesse Vainio – mixing
- Matthias Bäuerle – artwork, graphic design, logotype
- Anna Äärelä – photography

== Charts ==
=== Weekly charts ===
Chart (2017)	Peak position
Austrian Albums (Ö3 Austria)	2
Finnish Albums (Suomen virallinen lista)	4
German Albums (Offizielle Top 100)	1
Swiss Albums (Schweizer Hitparade)	2

=== Year-end charts ===
Chart (2017)	Position
Austrian Albums (Ö3 Austria)	22
German Albums (Offizielle Top 100)	21
Swiss Albums (Schweizer Hitparade)	30

Chart (2018)	Position
Swiss Albums (Schweizer Hitparade)	36

== Certifications ==
Region	Certification	Certified units/sales
Austria (IFPI Austria)	Gold	7,500^{‡}
Germany (BVMI)	Gold	100,000^{‡}
Switzerland (IFPI Switzerland)	Gold	10,000^{‡}
^{*} Sales figures based on certification alone.^{^} Shipments figures based on certification alone.^{‡} Sales+streaming figures based on certification alone.
