= Fairytale Gone Bad =

Single by Sunrise Avenue

from the album On the Way to Wonderland
- B-side: "Into the Blue"
- Released: 11 August 2006
- Genre: Pop rock; post-grunge
- Length: 3:25
- Label: Bonnier Amigo; Capitol (EMI)
- Songwriters: Jukka Backlund; Samu Haber
- Producer: Jukka Backlund

Sunrise Avenue singles chronology
"Romeo" (2006)	"Fairytale Gone Bad" (2006)	"Forever Yours" (2007)

Music video
- "Fairytale Gone Bad" on YouTube

"Fairytale Gone Bad" is a song recorded by the Finnish rock band Sunrise Avenue for their debut studio album, On the Way to Wonderland (2006). It charted successfully in many European countries, especially their native Finland as well as Germany, Greece and a number of other Northern and Eastern European countries.

== Music video ==
The music video for "Fairytale Gone Bad" was filmed on 2006 in Barcelona, Spain, and was directed by Ralf Strathmann.

== Track listing ==
CD single
No.	Title	Length
1.	"Fairytale Gone Bad" (radio edit)	3:33
2.	"Fairytale Gone Bad" (album version)	3:25
3.	"Fairytale Gone Bad" (acoustic version)	3:44
4.	"Fairytale Gone Bad" (instrumental version)	3:32
5.	"Into the Blue"	5:28

== Charts ==
=== Weekly charts ===
Chart (2006–07)	Peak position
Austria (Ö3 Austria Top 40)	3
Belgium (Ultratop 50 Flanders)	12
CIS Airplay (TopHit)	5
Finland (Suomen virallinen lista)	2
Germany (GfK)	3
Italy (FIMI)	23
Poland (Polish Airplay Charts)	2
Russia Airplay (TopHit)	3
Sweden (Sverigetopplistan)	10
Switzerland (Schweizer Hitparade)	2

Chart (2016)	Peak position
Poland Airplay (ZPAV)	71

=== Year-end charts ===
Chart (2006)	Position
Sweden (Sverigetopplistan)	68
Chart (2007)	Position
Austria (Ö3 Austria Top 40)	16
Belgium (Ultratop Flanders)	62
CIS (TopHit)	7
Germany (Official German Charts)	18
Russia Airplay (TopHit)	4
Sweden (Sverigetopplistan)	54
Switzerland (Schweizer Hitparade)	18
Chart (2008)	Position
CIS (TopHit)	173
Russia Airplay (TopHit)	131

=== Decade-end charts ===
Chart (2000–2009)	Position
Russia Airplay (TopHit)	10

== Certifications ==
Region	Certification	Certified units/sales
Finland (Musiikkituottajat)	Platinum	6,323
Germany (BVMI)	Platinum	300,000^{‡}
Sweden (GLF)	Gold	10,000^{^}
Switzerland (IFPI Switzerland)	Gold	15,000^{^}
^{^} Shipments figures based on certification alone.^{‡} Sales+streaming figures based on certification alone.
