= Jukka Immonen =

Finnish musician, composer and producer (born 1978)

- Born: Jukka Petteri Immonen; 14 April 1978 (age 48); Helsinki, Finland
- Genre: Pop
- Occupations: Musician; composer; producer

Jukka Petteri Immonen (born 14 April 1978) is a Finnish musician, record producer and composer.

== Career ==
=== Early years ===
Immonen started to develop an interest in music as a teenager when his parents bought him a computer. Although his family was not especially musical, his father knew some people from music industry, and Immonen got advice to get him started. In the late 1990s, he started to work mostly on hip hop music, and soon Immonen and Jan Zapasnik founded a record company Fried Music Oy. The first album produced entirely by Immonen was Punainen tiili by a rapper Asa in 2001.

=== Current work ===
During his career, Jukka Immonen has worked with a number of domestic and foreign artists, such as Jenni Vartiainen, Anna Abreu, Anssi Kela, Mariska & Pahat Sudet and Margaret Berger. Immonen has also composed music for Finnish films and television. He received a Jussi Award for Best Score in a Dome Karukoski film Tyttö sinä olet tähti (2005), and later worked with Karukoski again for his television series Veljet (2010). As a music producer, he received an Emma Award in 2010 for his work with Jenni Vartiainen, Mariska & Pahat Sudet, Anna Puu and Lemonator. Immonen is the co-writer of the Roberto Bellarosa song "Love Kills", Belgium's entry to the Eurovision Song Contest 2013.

== Personal life ==
Immonen cohabited with Finnish pop singer Jenni Vartiainen since 2009. The couple broke up in September 2014.

== Selected discography ==
=== As a producer ===
- Punainen tiili by Avain (2001)
- Diamond Station by Nerdee (2003)
- Kasvot vedessä by Jonna (2004)
- Street Music by Redrama (2005)
- Leijonaa metsästän by Asa (2005)
- Pretty Scary Silver Fairy by Margaret Berger (2006)
- Ihmisten edessä by Jenni Vartiainen (2007)
- Sucker for Love by Deep Insight (2009)
- Seili by Jenni Vartiainen (2010)
- Mariska & Pahat Sudet by Mariska & Pahat Sudet (2010)
- Out of Style by Sunrise Avenue (2011)
- Kukkurukuu by Mariska & Pahat Sudet (2012)
- Terra by Jenni Vartiainen (2013)
- Unholy Ground by Sunrise Avenue (2013)
- Heartbreak Century by Sunrise Avenue (2017)

== Filmography as a composer ==
- Tyttö sinä olet tähti (2005)
- Luonto ja terveys (2006)
- Veljet (2008)
- Jos rakastat (2010)
