= Killer (Finnish band) =

Finnish rock band

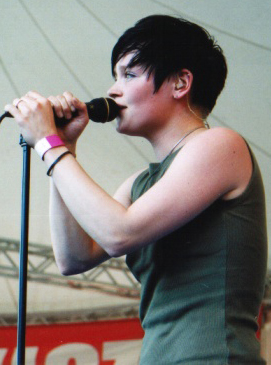

Background information
- Origin: Helsinki, Finland
- Genres: Alternative rock, experimental rock
- Years active: 1999–2005, 2026
- Labels: Universal Music; DRT Entertainment
- Members: Siiri Nordin; Teijo Jämsä; Jarkko Toivanen; Matias Kiiveri
- Past members: Timo Huhtala; Tuomas "Tumppi" Norvio

Killer is a rock band founded in 1999 in Helsinki, Finland. Although Killer was a quartet, vocalist Siiri Nordin was by far the most visible member. Band took an indefinite hiatus until their return in 2026 with a new lineup.

== History ==
The group's debut single Hurricane was released in February 2001. In August 2001 the debut was followed up by All I Want – a track that topped the local airplay list and made it to No. 2 on the charts, moving the band's debut album 'Sickeningly Pretty And Unpleasantly Vain' up to gold.

Their second album, Sure You Know How To Drive This Thing was internationally released in 2003 and entered the Finnish charts at position 7. Sure You Know How To Drive This Thing includes the song Naughty Boy which became the band's biggest hit. The song was one of the most played songs on Finnish radio during the summer of 2003; it also made it to number one on the MTV's Up North charts. One year later, Killer were invited to play at the Rock am Ring festival in Germany.

On February 5, 2005, bass player Timo Huhtala announced on the band's website the group will take an "undetermined break";

This didn't include any great drama, just normal things. First of all, we went five years in a row without a decent break, so we ran out of ideas and energy. Secondly, we had different kinds of ideas about the direction Killer should be going, musically that is. Since we couldn't agree on this we couldn't continue.

As a result, Timo and Teijo formed their new band Killer Aspect, the name being a combination of the band names Killer and Personal Aspect – the former band of the guitarist.

On February 20, 2026, the band announced its comeback with a new single, a new lineup and new shows to be held during the summer.

== Dynasty ==
Killer, along with Kwan and The Rasmus, were part of the initially unofficial association Dynasty, a loose association which joined the disparate bands. The association was found out of a friendship and joined interests and resulted in several co-operations: The Rasmus' members Lauri Ylönen and Pauli Rantasalmi produced both Killer's and Kwan's (the latter one only Rantasalmi) albums, Siiri appeared on Kwan's tracks Padam and Chillin' at the Grotto and Aki Hakala first played drums for Killer, later for Kwan before finally joining The Rasmus. Lauri also contributed lyrics to a special version of Killer's All I Want which was released as a b-side on the single.

== Discography ==
=== Albums ===
- Sickeningly Pretty & Unpleasantly Vain (2001)
- Sure You Know How to Drive This Thing (2003)

=== Singles ===
- All I Want (2001)
- Hurricane (2001)
- Fire (2002)
- Naughty Boy (2003)
- Watching – Waiting (2003)
- Liar (2003)
- Come Back (2026)

== Members ==
- Siiri Nordin (vocals, piano)
- Timo Huhtala (bass guitar)
- Teijo Jämsä (drums)
- Tuomas "Tumppi" Norvio (guitar)

== See also ==
- The Rasmus
- Kwan
- Killer Aspect
