= Jenni Jaakkola =

Finnish singer-songwriter (born 1999)

- Born: 20 February 1999 (age 26); Kiiminki, Finland
- Occupation: singer
- Labels: Hyökyaalto Records / Warner Music (2013–)

Jenni Jaakkola (b. 20 February 1999) is a Finnish singer-songwriter. She was the winner of the first series of KIDSing children's song contest on MTV3, Finnish television. Winning the final on 25 May 2013, Jaakkola received a recording contract with Antti Tuisku's label, Hyökyaalto ("Tsunami") Records. She also headlined a 2013 celebration tour.

Jaakkolan began recording her debut album in July 2013. Siipeni mun ("My Wings") was released on 11 October 2013.

In 2016 Jaakkola recorded The Guides and Scouts of Finland jamboree Roihu 2016 official camp song Roihu. In the autumn she made a cameo appearance on the Yle soap opera Uusi päivä ("A New Day"), recording a music video with the "made-for-tv" band Bangoland

== Discography ==
=== Albums ===
Title	Details	Charts
Siipeni mun	Released:11 October 2013; Label: Warner Music Finland; Format: CD / digital download	No. 13

=== Singles ===
Year	Single	Album
2013	"Tämä on unta"	Siipeni mun
2013	Minä ja siipeni mun –	Siipeni mun

=== Music videos ===
- Tämä on unta (Dir. Samu Amunét)
- Minä ja siipeni mun (Dir. Joonas Laaksoharju)
- Roihu (Dir. Aapo Rainio)
