= Sunrise Avenue =

Finnish rock band

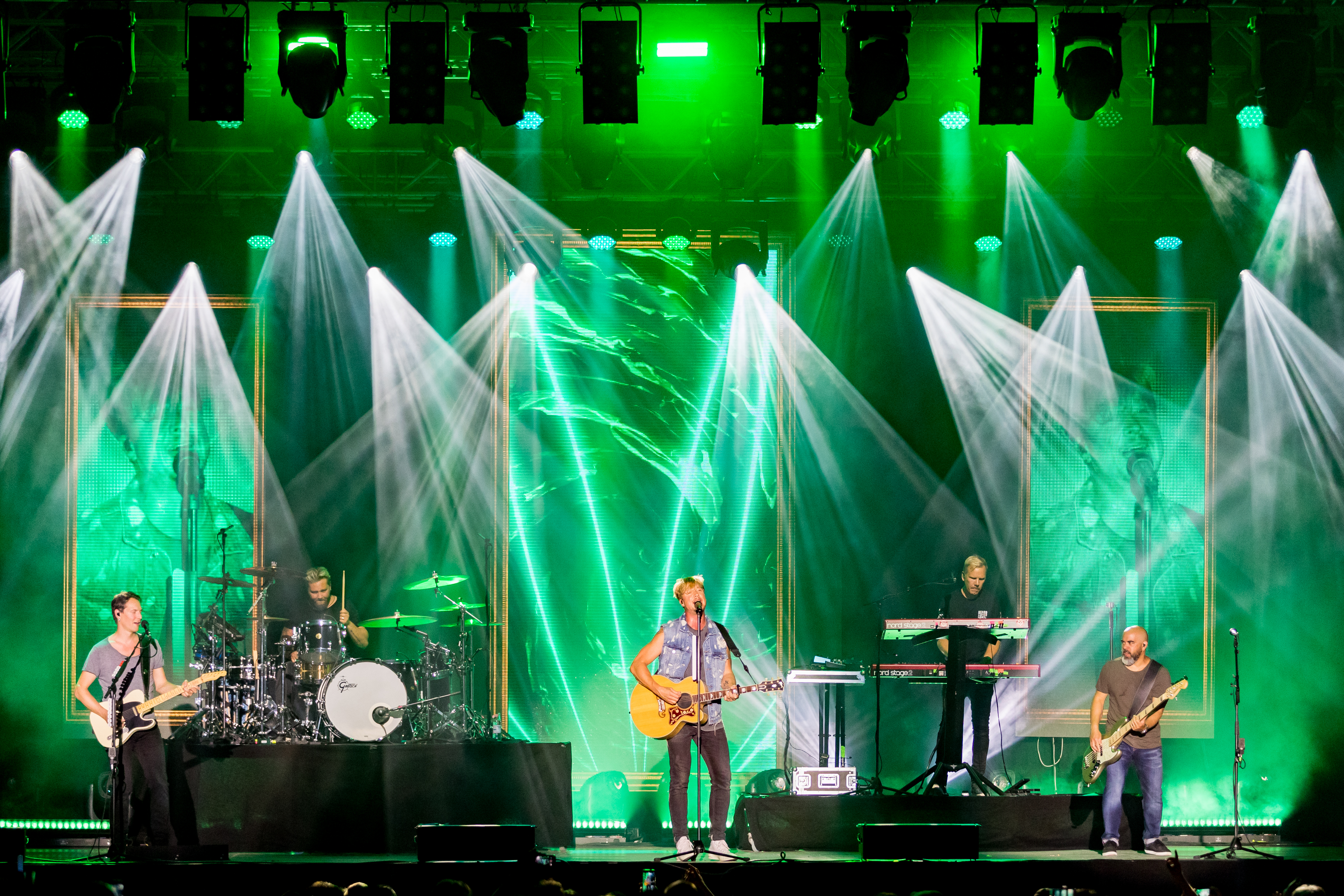
- Sunrise Avenue performing in Ludwigshafen, Germany, in 2019

Background information
- Also known as: Sunrise (1992–2001)
- Origin: Helsinki, Finland
- Genres: Alternative rock; soft rock; pop rock; post-grunge
- Years active: 2002–2022
- Labels: Universal Music; Polydor; EMI; Bonnier Amigo
- Members: Samu Haber; Raul Ruutu; Sami Osala; Riku Rajamaa; Osmo Ikonen (touring member since 2009)
- Past members: Janne Kärkkäinen; Teijo Jämsä; Jukka Backlund
- Website: SunriseAve.com

Sunrise Avenue was a Finnish rock band originally formed in 2002 in Helsinki, Finland. In the early days, the band was called Sunrise and the name was changed to Sunrise Avenue in 2001. Their style varies from rock and pop-rock to rock ballads. Sunrise Avenue's best known songs are "Hollywood Hills" (2011), "Fairytale Gone Bad" (2006), "Lifesaver" (2013), "I Help You Hate Me" (2017), "Forever Yours" (2007), "Welcome to My Life" (2009), "The Whole Story" (2009) and "Heal Me" (2007). The band has released five studio albums, four live albums, three live DVDs, two compilation albums and 27 singles. They are successful and known across continental Europe, especially their home country and Germany as well as some Eastern European countries.

== History ==
=== Founding and early years (1992–2005) ===
Samu Haber established Sunrise together with Finnish singer-songwriter Jan Hohenthal in April 1992 in Espoo, Finland. They performed at a variety of pubs, small festivals and private parties until 1998, when Haber moved to Spain. The other band members at that time were Sami Heinänen (bass) and Antti Tuomela (drums).

After four years in Spain and only a handful of performances at private Spanish events, Haber moved back to Finland. The band changed the name to Sunrise Avenue in October 2001 in restaurant Memphis in Helsinki at the "Sunrise world domination plan meeting." By that time Tuomela had left the band and the band had no drummer. Heinänen designed the American Street sign logo for the band after the meeting.

Hohenthal left the band in 2002 as he wanted to focus on his own career. These days Hohenthal plays with his Finnish folk band Metrofolk. Heinänen introduced a new guitarist, his high school friend Janne Kärkkäinen to the band in 2002.

With a new drummer, Juho Sandman, the band performed in many student events, small festivals and in small clubs mostly in the Greater Helsinki area. They worked with two Finnish producers, Jone Ullakko and Jani Saastamoinen, before finding their future in-house producer Jukka Backlund. Haber still says Backlund is the "All time musical mentor and teacher for himself and for the band."

Between 2002 and 2005, Haber visited record companies and agencies 102 times in Finland and Sweden before they were finally signed to small Scandinavian label Bonnier Amigo Music. The answer was always the same: "Without black clothes and make-up, rock music can't succeed."

=== Debut and second albums (2006–2010) ===
To finance the debut album On the Way to Wonderland, Haber introduced the "Sunrise Avenue Business Plan" to his friend, a copy machine sales man Mikko Virtala. Virtala financed most of the album's recordings and a trip to Midem Music Expo in Cannes, France, to meet the European managers and labels. In Cannes, Haber met the band's future manager Bob Cunningham from the UK. On the Way to Wonderland was released in 2006 in most of Europe. Their biggest hit "Fairytale Gone Bad" reached several top positions in radio and single charts in many European countries, and the band performed three sold-out European tours and the biggest European festivals, such as the main stage of Rock am Ring in 2007.

In 2007, the band decided to fire Kärkkäinen after a long difficult era. Kärkkäinen filed a lawsuit against the band claiming they had no right to perform as Sunrise Avenue without him. The band won the court case on the first level court in Finland and after three years of legal fight, both parties made a classified financial agreement for the future and all cases were dropped. The band name and the trademark is owned now by the only remaining original band member Samu Haber.

In 2008, Haber and Backlund bought the Sonic Kitchen Recording Studio in Helsinki together with a Finnish producer Aku Sinivalo. Sunrise Avenue recorded the second studio album Popgasm at Sonic Kitchen Studios. Haber and Backlund sold their share of the studio in 2010.

=== Acoustic Tour 2010 and later albums (2010–2020) ===
In 2010, Sunrise Avenue recorded the acoustic shows on their tour in Germany, Switzerland and Austria, and released the best moments on their Acoustic Tour 2010 album in most of Europe.

In 2010, Sunrise Avenue started working with their third studio album together with Backlund and a new producer Jukka Immonen. The songs were written in Helsinki, Los Angeles, Tokyo, Stockholm, Greece and Germany. With two producers in the team, Haber became the band's executive producer. In the summer of 2010 after negotiating with many Scandinavian major record companies, Sunrise Avenue signed a worldwide deal with Universal Music (excluding Germany, Switzerland and Austria). Out of Style was released in 70 countries and the first single "Hollywood Hills" was a major radio and sales hit in many European countries.

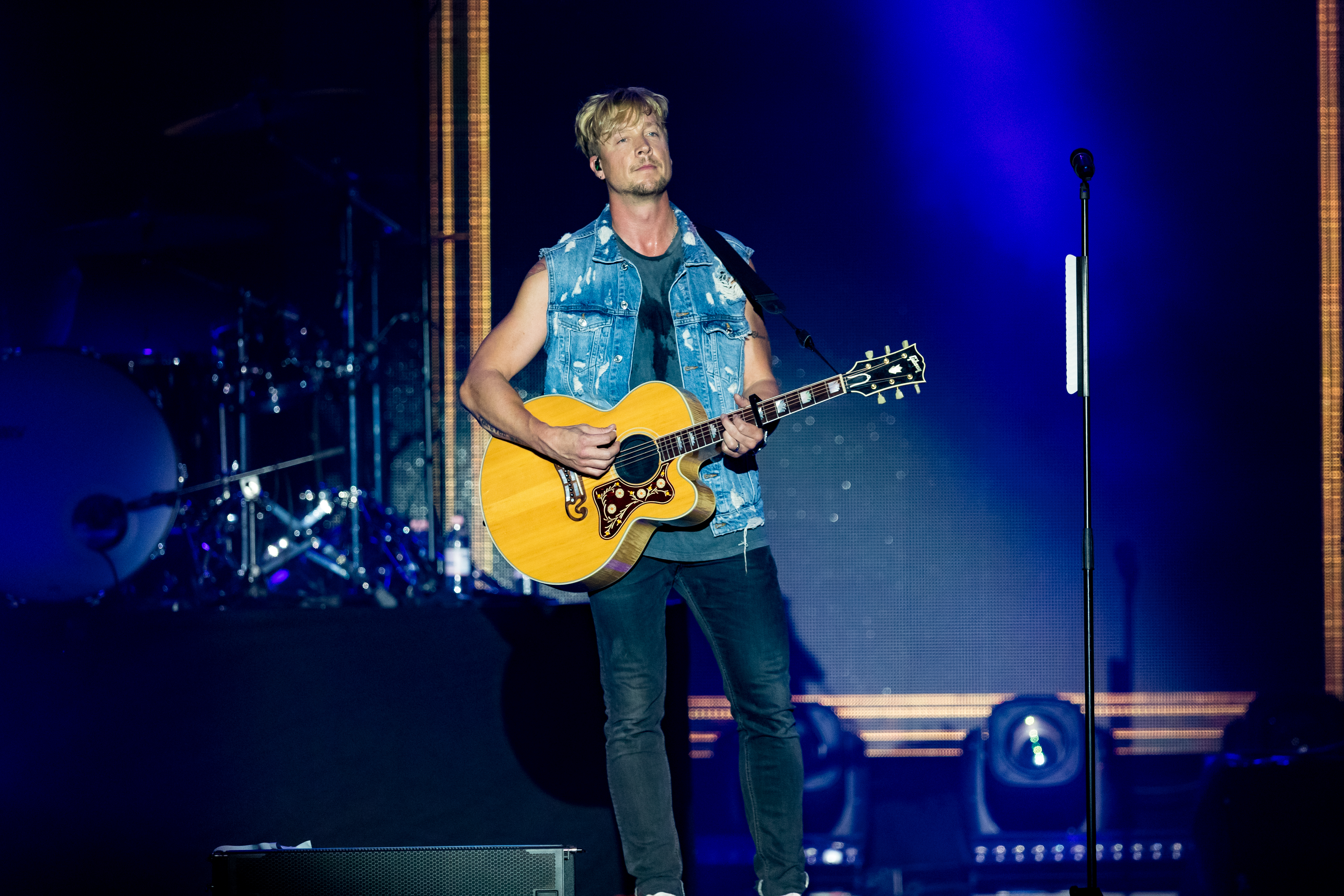
Samu Haber with the band in 2019

In 2013, Sunrise Avenue released their fourth studio album, Unholy Ground, which was a huge success in Germany, Austria and in Switzerland. So far the album has sold platinum in Germany and in Switzerland, in Austria it has reached the gold limit. "Lifesaver" was the first single and it was a huge radio hit. Unholy Ground was a groundbreaking album and the tour after the release was sold out in several countries with venues up to 12,000 capacities.

In 2014, Sunrise Avenue released their first compilation album, Fairytales – Best of 2006–2014. The album went straight to #1 in the German and Swiss album charts and went platinum in Germany and gold in Switzerland.

In 2016, the band released one single, "Prisoner in Paradise". A new album followed in 2017 titled Heartbreak Century, which entered the German album charts at #1 position. The album spawned three singles namely "I Help You Hate Me", "Let Me Go" and the title track. The new album was also accompanied by a European Tour in late 2017 through mid 2018. In 2018, a further single titled "Dreamer" was released.

=== Final years (2020–2022) ===
After a quiet 2019, at a press conference in Helsinki, the band announced on 2 December 2019 that they would not continue past 2020. They announced one final single titled "Thank You for Everything" and a small final tour in 2020 with a total of seven locations plus one festival, after which the band will no longer be active. However, on 1 March 2021, they seemingly reunited, announcing new website and new album, alongside new band merch.

After long waiting due to COVID-19 pandemic, Sunrise Avenue started their Farewell Live Concert tour in 2022. Their farewell concert tour started in Finland (Seinäjoki and Helsinki). They also released a documentary called This Is the End of the concert held in Helsinki.

Sunrise Avenue's farewell concert tour continued to Germany in autumn 2022 (Hannover, Hamburg, Cologne, Leipzig, Stuttgart, Berlin, Munich, Frankfurt and Düsseldorf). The group played their final show in Düsseldorf on 18 September 2022.

Starting from November 2020, Sunrise Avenue's lead singer and songwriter Samu Haber is continuing his career as a solo artist and mainly singing in Finnish language.

== Band members ==
Final line-up

- Samu Aleksi Haber (born 2 April 1976) – vocals, guitar (1992–2022)
- Ilkka "Raul" Ruutu (born 28 August 1975) – bass, background vocals (2002–2022)
- Sami Tapio Osala (born 10 March 1980) – drums (2005–2022)
- Riku Juhani Rajamaa (born 4 November 1975) – lead guitar, background vocals (2007–2022)

Tour members

- Osmo Ikonen – keyboards (2009–2022)

Former members

- Jan Hohenthal – guitar, vocals (1992–2002)
- Sami Heinänen – bass, background vocals (1995–2002)
- Teijo Jämsä – drums (2004–2006)
- Janne Kärkkäinen – guitar, background vocals (2002–2007)
- Juho Sandman – drums, background vocals (2002–2004)
- Jukka Backlund – keyboards (2005–2008)
- Olli Tumelius – drums (2005)
- Lenni-Kalle Taipale – keyboards (2010)
- Heikki Puhakainen – (2011)

== Discography ==
Albums

- On the Way to Wonderland (2006)
- Popgasm (2009)
- Acoustic Tour 2010 (2010)
- Out of Style (2011)
- Out of Style – Live Edition (2012)
- Unholy Ground (2013)
- Fairytales – Best of 2006–2014 (2014)
- Heartbreak Century (2017)
- Live with Wonderland Orchestra (2021)

== Awards ==
Award	Year	Nominee(s)	Category	Result	Ref.
Echo Music Prize	2008	Sunrise Avenue	Best International Group	Nominated	
Echo Music Prize	2012	Sunrise Avenue	Best International Group	Nominated	
Echo Music Prize	2014	Sunrise Avenue	Best International Group	Nominated	
Echo Music Prize	2015	Sunrise Avenue	Best International Group	Nominated	
Echo Music Prize	2016	Sunrise Avenue	Best International Group	Nominated	
Echo Music Prize	2018	Sunrise Avenue	Best International Group	Nominated	

Year	Award
2007	NRJ Music Awards: Best Nordic Band, Best Newcomer Band, Best Nordic Album (On the Way to Wonderland); Emma [Finland]: Best Newcomer Finland
2008	Emma (Finnish Grammy): Biggest Export; European Border Breakers Award (EBBA) presented by the EU in Cannes, France; Eska Radio Award [Poland]; Radio Regenbogen Listener's Award [Germany]
2011	Sold-Out-Award (Out-of-Style Tour); Emma (Finnish Grammy): Biggest Export
2013	Emma (Finnish Grammy): Biggest Export
