= V2.fi =

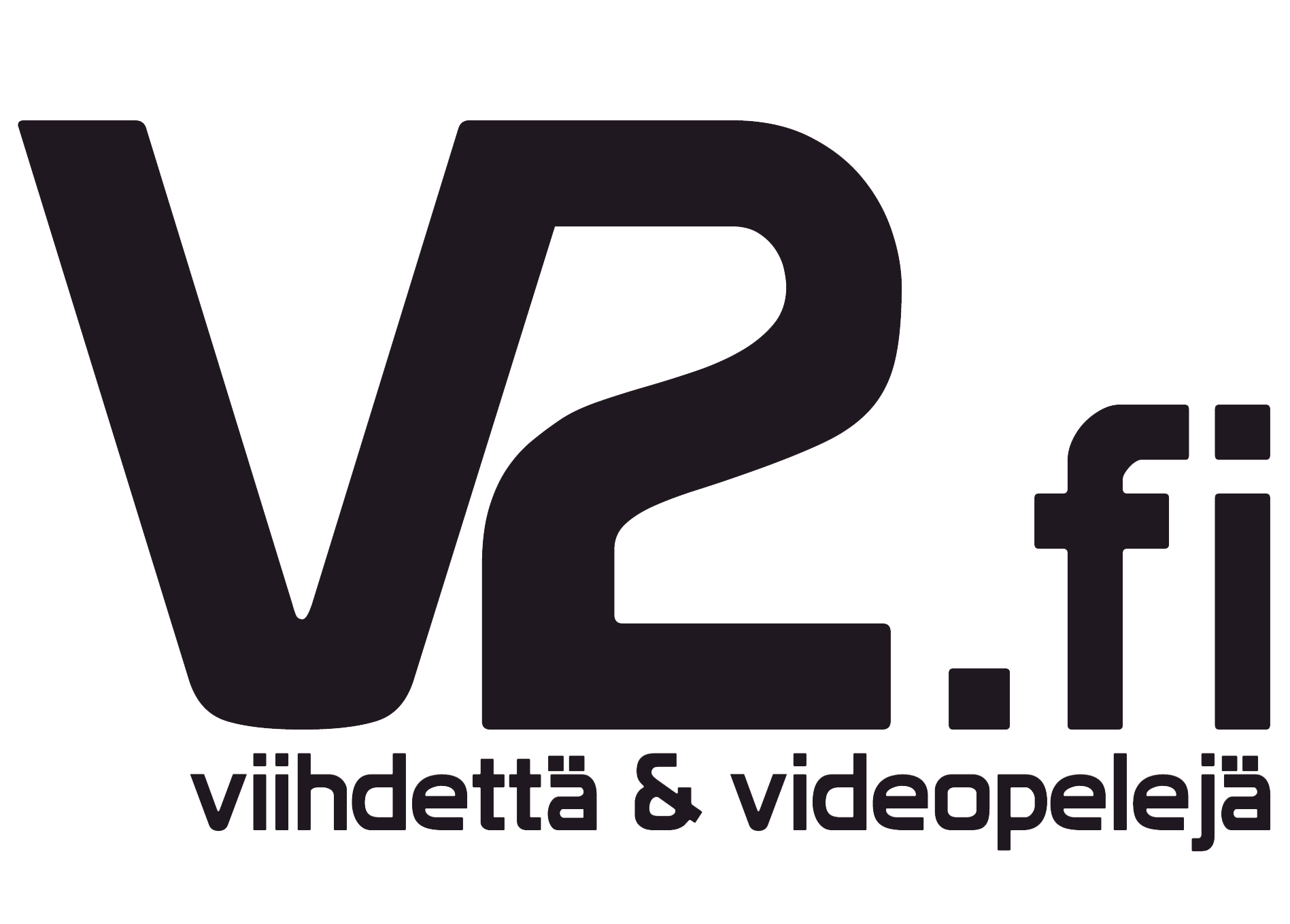
- V2.fi logo

- Website type: entertainment web-portal
- Country of origin: Finland
- Owner: Alasin Media
- Website: www.v2.fi
- Registration: Optional
- Launched: August 6, 2007; 19 years ago
- Current status: Active

V2.fi is a Finnish entertainment and gaming oriented website that publishes daily articles, reviews, and news about movies, video games, music, and entertainment devices. All of the content published on the site is open for user supplied comments. The site was published by Alasin Media in August 2007.

== Statistics ==
According to public TNS Metrix site measurements there are about 45 000—53 000 weekly visitors on the site.
