= Hollywood Hills (song) =

Single by Sunrise Avenue

from the album Out of Style
- B-side: "What I Like About You"
- Released: 25 February 2011
- Recorded: 2010
- Genre: Emo pop; rock
- Length: 3:30
- Label: Capitol; Universal Music
- Songwriter: Samu Haber
- Producer: Jukka Immonen

Sunrise Avenue singles chronology
"Welcome to My Life" (2009)	"Hollywood Hills" (2011)	"I Don't Dance" (2011)

Music video
- "Hollywood Hills" on YouTube

"Hollywood Hills" is a song recorded by the Finnish rock band Sunrise Avenue for their third studio album, Out of Style (2011).

== Background ==
"Hollywood Hills" was written by the lead vocalist of the band, Samu Haber, while the production was done by Finnish producer and musician Jukka Immonen. It is an emo pop song, which according to Jon O'Brien of AllMusic helps the band sound tighter than ever.

It was released as the lead single from the album on 25 February 2011; the song was made available for digital download via Amazon. Following its release it charted in several European countries. It was more successful in Finland where it reached #2. It also reached #3 in Austria, Germany and Switzerland.

== Personnel ==
Credits adapted from the liner notes of Out of Style.

Locations

- Recorded at Studio Petrax and Fried Music in Finland

Personnel

- Samu Haber – vocals, guitar, songwriting
- Raul Ruutu – bass guitar
- Sami Osala – drums, percussion
- Riku Rajamaa – guitar
- Lasse Enersen – strings
- Svante Forsbäck – mastering
- Jesse Vainio – mixing
- Jukka Immonen – production, recording, programming
- Arttu Peljo – recording

== Charts ==
=== Weekly charts ===
Chart (2011–2012)	Peak position
Austria (Ö3 Austria Top 40)	3
Belgium (Ultratop 50 Flanders)	15
Czech Republic Airplay (ČNS IFPI)	4
Finland (Suomen virallinen lista)	2
Germany (GfK)	3
Slovenia (SloTop50)	1
Sweden (Sverigetopplistan)	24
Switzerland (Schweizer Hitparade)	3

Chart (2026)	Peak position
Poland (Polish Airplay Top 100)	67

=== Year-end charts ===
Chart (2011)	Position
Austria (Ö3 Austria Top 40)	18
Belgium (Ultratop Flanders)	84
Germany (Official German Charts)	11
Sweden (Sverigetopplistan)	87
Switzerland (Schweizer Hitparade)	21

== Certifications ==
Region	Certification	Certified units/sales
Austria (IFPI Austria)	Platinum	30,000^{*}
Germany (BVMI)	5× Gold	750,000^{‡}
Sweden (GLF)	2× Platinum	80,000^{‡}
Switzerland (IFPI Switzerland)	Platinum	30,000^{^}
^{*} Sales figures based on certification alone.^{^} Shipments figures based on certification alone.^{‡} Sales+streaming figures based on certification alone.
