= Samu Haber =

Finnish singer, guitarist and songwriter (born 1976)

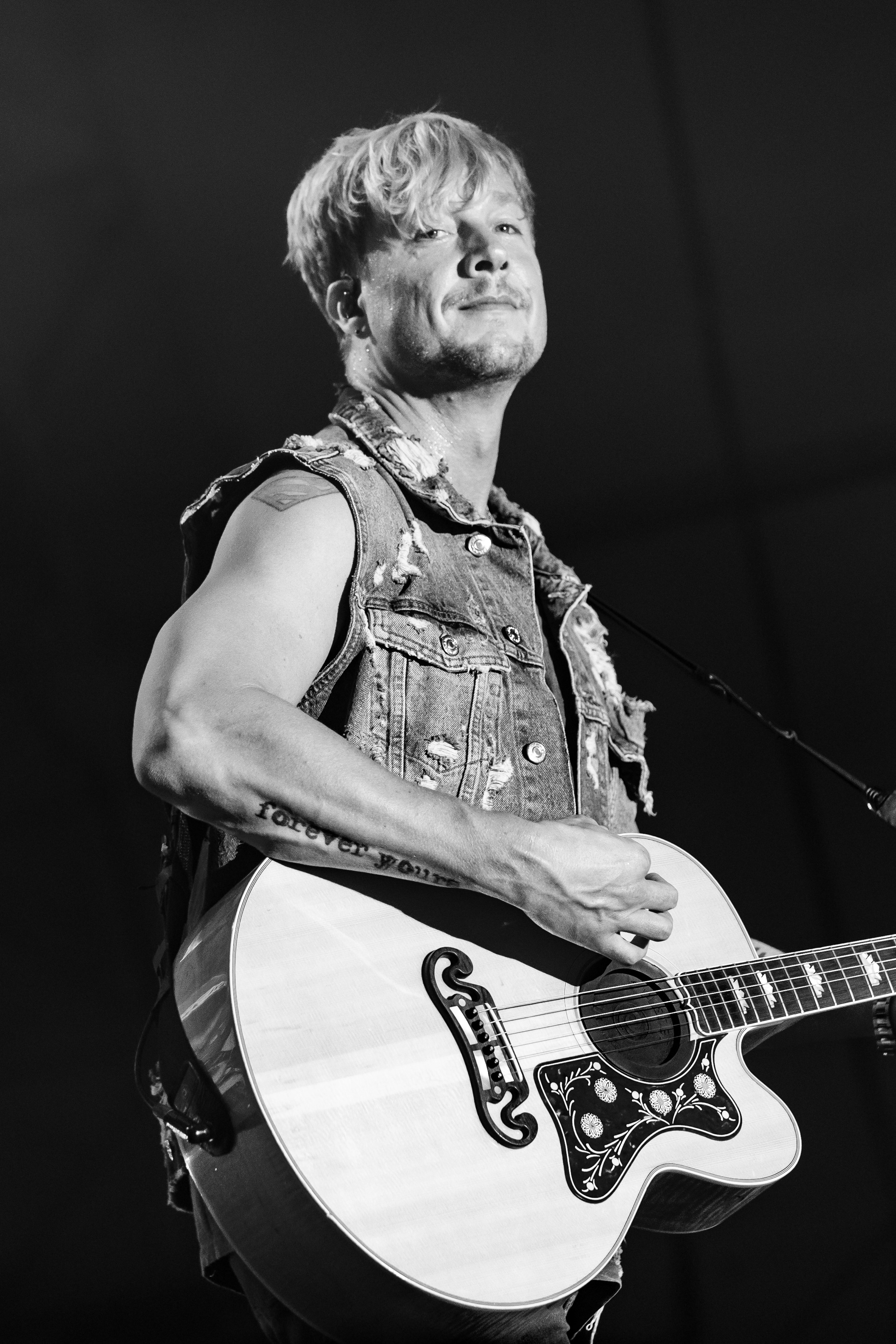
- Haber in 2019

Background information
- Born: Samu Aleksi Haber; 2 April 1976 (age 50); Helsinki, Finland
- Genres: Pop; pop rock; alternative rock; post-grunge
- Occupations: Singer; songwriter; guitarist
- Instruments: Vocals; guitar
- Years active: 1992–present
- Labels: Polydor; Capitol; Universal; Bonnier Amigo; EMI
- Formerly of: Sunrise Avenue
- Website: www.samuhaber.com

Samu Aleksi Haber (born 2 April 1976) is a Finnish singer, songwriter, television music competition judge and entrepreneur. He was the lead vocalist, guitarist and frontman of the rock band Sunrise Avenue. In 2022, the band went on an indefinite hiatus, allowing Haber to focus on his solo career. As a solo artist, Haber sings in both Finnish and English.

== Early life ==
Haber's father's family is from Germany, but his family has always lived in Finland. He has one sister, Sanna (born 23 January 1978) and one brother, Santtu (born 29 January 1989).

== Career ==
=== Sunrise Avenue ===
Haber established the band Sunrise in 1992 with his friend Jan Hohenthal. Hohenthal left the band in 2002 as he wanted to focus on his solo career. In 2002, Haber changed the band name to Sunrise Avenue. Between 2002 and 2005, Haber visited 102 record companies and agents trying to find a label for Sunrise Avenue's music. The first album was made with financial help from Haber's friend Mikko Virtala, who sold his house to pay the studio costs.

Haber's band Sunrise Avenue released five studio albums, the first three selling more than 3 million albums and 2 million singles worldwide. Haber was Sunrise Avenue's main songwriter and he wrote all the band's songs either alone or with a producer and co-writer. The band's last international hit "Hollywood Hills" was written by Haber alone.

=== Collaborations, television ===
Haber is working as co-manager for new Finnish bands and artists together with the CoMusic Management. Haber owned studio Sonic Kitchen with producers Jukka Backlund and Aku Sinivalo from 2007 to 2010.

Haber was a coach on the German talent competition The Voice of Germany in 2013, 2014, 2016, 2017, and 2024. In 2020, Haber teamed up with Rea Garvey for a duo coaching team. The winners of the 2017, 2020, and 2024 seasons were members of his team, making him the winning coach for his latter three seasons.

Haber presented Uuden Musiikin Kilpailu 2023, Finland's national selection for the Eurovision Song Contest 2023.

=== Solo career ===
Haber's first single "Enkelten kaupunki" (in English "City of Angels") was released in the end of 2020. Haber has also written solo songs including: "Täältä tullaan" (2021), "Sä" (2022) and "Sata vuotta sitten" (2022). Haber's first solo album Pelastetaan maailma was released on 30 September 2022.

As a solo artist, Haber visited the Finnish television program Vain elämää season 6 (2017) and season 10 (2019). Some of the songs featured in Vain elämää Haber performed with original lyrics and other songs Haber wrote to a new and updated form. He also made singles out of those songs.

Updated songs (single releases)

- 2017 (Vain elämää, season 6):
  - "Hiljaisuus" orig. Irina
  - "Joutsenlaulu" orig. Yö
  - "Onnellinen", orig. Robin Packalen (prev. Robin)
  - "Perjantai 13." orig. Nikke Ankara
  - "Satuprinsessa" orig. Tiktak
  - "Kerran" orig. Laura Voutilainen
- 2019 (Vain elämää, season 10):
  - "Ikuinen vappu" orig. JVG
  - "Hanuri" orig. Antti Tuisku
  - "Vanha sydän" orig. Erin
  - "Tequila" orig. Vesala
  - "Tuulettaa" orig. Elastinen
  - "Hyvä ihminen" orig. Timo Rautiainen & Trio Niskalaukaus

== Personal life ==
Haber is an ice hockey fanatic and his favourite team is Helsingfors IFK. Haber played ice hockey in Espoon Kiekkoseura until the age of 14 as defence-man attending tournaments also in Canada and the United States. Haber's other hobbies are kettle bell training and jogging.

Haber's military status is Finnish Navy Sergeant.

== Discography ==
=== Albums ===
==== Studio albums ====
List of studio albums, with selected chart positions
Title	Details	Peak chart positions			
Title	Details	FIN	GER	AUT	SWI
Pelastetaan maailma	Released: 30 September 2022; Label: Capitol; Formats: CD, digital download, streaming	1	—	—	53
Me Free My Way	Released: 4 October 2024; Label: Polydor; Formats: CD, digital download, streaming	21	4	4	9
"—" denotes a recording that did not chart or was not released in that territory.

==== Live albums ====
List of live albums
Title	Details
Me Free My Way – Live from European Tour	Released: 13 December 2024; Label: Polydor; Formats: CD, digital download, streaming

=== Singles ===
==== As lead artist ====
List of singles as lead artist, with selected chart positions, showing year released and album name
Title	Year	Peak chart positions	Album
Title	Year	FIN	Album
"Joutsenlaulu"	2017	—	Vain elämää – kausi 6 (soundtrack singles)
"Satuprinsessa"	2017	19	Vain elämää – kausi 6 (soundtrack singles)
"Onnellinen"	2017	—	Vain elämää – kausi 6 (soundtrack singles)
"Hiljaisuus"	2017	—	Vain elämää – kausi 6 (soundtrack singles)
"Perjantai 13."	2017	—	Vain elämää – kausi 6 (soundtrack singles)
"Kerran"	2017	—	Vain elämää – kausi 6 (soundtrack singles)
"Heroes" (with Carpark North)	2018	—	Non-album single
"Hanuri"	2019	7	Vain elämää – kausi 10 (soundtrack singles)
"Tequila"	2019	—	Vain elämää – kausi 10 (soundtrack singles)
"Ikuinen vappu"	2019	8	Vain elämää – kausi 10 (soundtrack singles)
"Ei kukaan tuu sulta tuntumaan"	2019	—	Vain elämää – kausi 10 (soundtrack singles)
"Vanha sydän"	2019	—	Vain elämää – kausi 10 (soundtrack singles)
"Tuulettaa"	2019	—	Vain elämää – kausi 10 (soundtrack singles)
"Hyvä ihminen"	2019	—	Vain elämää – kausi 10 (soundtrack singles)
"Enkelten kaupunki"	2021	16	Pelastetaan maailma
"Täältä tullaan"	2021	20	Pelastetaan maailma
"Sä"	2022	10	Pelastetaan maailma
"Kuunnellaan vaan taivasta"	2022	—	Non-album single
"Sata vuotta sitten"	2022	—	Pelastetaan maailma
"Sä et tiedä elämästä mitään"	2022	—	Pelastetaan maailma
"Hometown Gang"	2022	—	The Grump: In Search of an Escort (soundtrack)
"Purjeissa" (with JVG)	2023	10	Non-album singles
"Raketilla Aurinkoon"	2023	—	Non-album singles
"Monenmoista"	2023	—	Non-album singles
"Gimme Your Hand"	2024	—	Me Free My Way
"Paha päivä"	2024	—	Non-album single
"Me Free My Way"	2024	—	Me Free My Way
"Dancing with a Broken Heart"	2024	—	Me Free My Way
"Hideaway"	2024	—	Me Free My Way
"Who Do I"	2024	—	Me Free My Way
"Hollywood Heels"	2024	—	Me Free My Way
"The Vehicle"	2024	—	Me Free My Way
"Kauan eläköön rakkaus"	2025	—	Non-album singles
"23"	2025	—	Non-album singles
"Karkki"	2025	—	Non-album singles
"Good Boy"	2025	—	Non-album singles
"—" denotes a single that did not chart or was not released in that territory.

==== As featured artist ====
List of singles as featured artist, with selected chart positions, showing year released and album name
Title	Year	Peak chart positions			Album
Title	Year	GER	AUT	SWI	Album
"No Matter What They Say" (Follow Your Instinct featuring Samu Haber)	2012	54	68	—	Animal Kingdom
"35" (Kim Herold featuring Samu Haber)	2015	—	—	—	Kim Herold
"A Hundred Years" (Niila featuring Samu Haber)	2016	—	—	—	Gratitude
"Tarpeeks täydellinen" (Elastinen featuring Samu Haber)	2016	—	—	—	Elastinen Feat.
"Sä saat mut palasiksi" (STEREO featuring Samu Haber)	2019	—	—	—	00740
"Someone Better" (Paula Dalla Corte featuring Rea Garvey and Samu Haber)	2020	30	—	3	Non-album singles
"Hollywood Hills" (Captain Curtis and Valexus featuring Samu Haber)	2025	—	—	—	Non-album singles
"—" denotes a single that did not chart or was not released in that territory.

== Filmography ==
Year	Title	Role
2022	The Grump: In Search of an Escort	Otto
